= List of American Academy of Arts and Sciences members (2020–2022) =

The following is a list of members of the American Academy of Arts and Sciences from 2020 to 2023.

== 2020 ==
- Katharine G. Abraham
- Sarita V. Adve
- Syed Babar Ali
- Maydianne C.B. Andrade
- Susan C. Antón
- Elena Aprile
- Katrina A. Armstrong
- Robert C. Armstrong
- Joan Baez
- Biman Bagchi
- Zainab Bahrani
- Houston A. Baker Jr.
- David J. Barron
- Michele Barry
- Yasmine Belkaid
- Hugo J. Bellen
- Joy M. Bergelson
- Irina G. Bokova
- Sandrine Bony
- Catherine Boone
- Eduardo S. Brondizio
- Tomiko Brown-Nagin
- Debra A. Cafaro
- Cheshire Calhoun
- Paul C. Canfield
- Blanche Capel
- Mary Carruthers
- Ana Mari Cauce
- Jeannine Cavender-Bares
- Howard Y. Chang
- Lynn W. Chang
- R. Alta Charo
- Edith Chen
- Pierre-André Chiappori
- Melissa Chiu
- Steven L. Chown
- Paul M. Churchland
- Thomas R. Clandinin
- Adela Yarbro Collins
- James P. Collins
- Kathleen Collins
- Blossom Damania
- Trisha N. Davis
- Geraldine Dawson
- Caroline Dean
- Anne Dejean
- Dave Donaldson
- Catherine L. Drennan
- John A. Dupré
- Brent Hayes Edwards
- Luis E. Eguiarte Fruns
- Santiago F. Elena Fito
- Maud Ellmann
- Beverly Marie Emerson
- Stephen Engelberg
- Nuruddin Farah
- Bernard R. Faure
- Malcolm M. Feeley
- James Ferguson
- Daniel J. Finley
- Nikky Finney
- Françoise Forges
- Lawrence D. Freedman
- Miranda Fricker
- Agustín Fuentes
- Elena Fuentes-Afflick
- Laura Gagliardi
- Giulia Galli
- Rubén Gallo
- Forrest Gander
- Miguel A. García-Garibay
- Helene D. Gayle
- Andrew Gelman
- Nancy Gertner
- Lorna Goodison
- Kevin Gover
- Vicki H. Grassian
- Karen Guillemin
- Kris D. Gutiérrez
- Margaret A. Hamburg
- Joy Harjo
- Suzan Shown Harjo
- M. Zahid Hasan
- Graham F. Hatfull
- Edgar Heap of Birds
- Joseph Heitman
- Charles J. Henry
- Thomas A. Henzinger
- Linda M. Heywood
- Anita F. Hill
- Christopher P. Hill
- Marc M. Hirschmann
- Ann Hochschild
- Helmut H Hofer
- Eric H. Holder
- Anita K. Hopper
- George M. Hornberger
- William G. Howell
- Caroline M. Hoxby
- Yonggang Huang
- Lawrence R. Jacobs
- Amaney A. Jamal
- Abigail P. Johnson
- E. Patrick Johnson
- Bryan D. Jones
- Jeffrey L. Jowell
- Dan Jurafsky
- William G. Kaelin
- Carl F. Kaestle
- Susan Kalisz
- Daniel Merson Kammen
- Shun-ichiro Karato
- Michael Kazin
- Dacher Keltner
- Renu Khator
- Philip Kim
- Paul V. Kiparsky
- Seth A. Klarman
- Wendell J. Knox
- Hanna M. Kokko
- Sally A. Kornbluth
- Rachel E. Kranton
- Loeske Kruuk
- Clark Spencer Larsen
- Erika Lee
- Ruby B. Lee
- Margaret S. Leinen
- Jeanette Lerman-Neubauer
- Daniel E. Lieberman
- Richard S. Linklater
- Diane Lipscombe
- Michal Lipson
- Adam Liptak
- Eric P. Liu
- Diana M. Liverman
- Susanna Loeb
- Susan T. Lovett
- Guillermina Lozano
- Susan Lozier
- Li Lu
- Chung-Pei Ma
- Sarah C. Mangelsdorf
- Anna K. Mapp
- Isabela Mares
- Fiona B. Marshall
- Jenny S. Martinez
- Margaret R. Martonosi
- Gary S. May
- James M. Mayer
- M. Margaret McKeown
- Katherine McKittrick
- Xiao-Li Meng
- Bruce A. Menge
- Edward Miguel
- Jennifer L. Mnookin
- Amina J. Mohammed
- Ingrid T. Monson
- Richard D. Mooney
- Rachel S. Moore
- Aileen Moreton-Robinson
- Tom W. Muir
- Denis M. Mukwege
- Gregory L. Murphy
- Steven Nadler
- Shobhana Narasimhan
- Lisa Naughton
- Victor Nee
- Alondra Nelson
- Senga Nengudi
- André Neves
- Mary D. Nichols
- Pedro A. Noguera
- Colin P. Nuckolls
- Zaki Anwar Nusseibeh
- Anne Joseph O'Connell
- Teri W. Odom
- Adebayo O. Ogunlesi
- Patrick Olivelle
- Victoria J. Orphan
- Eve Charis Ostriker
- Julie Overbaugh
- Ardem S. Patapoutian
- Ann Patchett
- Mary E. Pattillo
- Arogyaswami J. Paulraj
- Thoru Pederson
- Catherine L. Peichel
- Fernando C. N. Pereira
- Roderic I. Pettigrew
- Patricia Phelps de Cisneros
- Ann Philbin
- Philip W. Phillips
- Seth D. Pollak
- Daniel R. Porterfield
- Vincent E. Price
- Molly Przeworski
- Jie Qiao
- Suparna Rajaram
- Enrico Ramirez-Ruiz
- Guthrie P. Ramsey, Jr.
- Thomas A. Rando
- Claudia Rankine
- Alexander Razborov
- Jennifer A. Richeson
- Cristina M. Rodríguez
- Charles M. Roessel
- Peter A. Rogerson
- Carole Rothman
- Ronitt Rubinfeld
- Lauren M Ruetsche
- Cristine Russell
- Wendy Sandler
- Richmond Sarpong
- Greg Sarris
- Kenneth F. Scheve
- Maria Schneider
- Julie A. Segre
- Marjorie D. Shapiro
- Val C. Sheffield
- Robert F. Siliciano
- Eva Silverstein
- Kavita Singh
- Mario Luis Small
- Valerie Smith
- Alexander J. Smits
- David Soskice
- Marilda Antonia de Oliveira Sotomayor
- Eugene H. Spafford
- James P. Spillane
- George R. Stark
- G. Gabrielle Starr
- Kathleen J. Stebe
- Karen P. Steel
- Sarah Stillman
- James Stone
- Michael E. Stone
- Lisa T. Su
- Fumihiko Sueki
- Winnifred Fallers Sullivan
- Sarah Sze
- Sylvia R. Tamale
- Chandrika K. Tandon
- Ann Temkin
- Joshua B. Tenenbaum
- John K. Thornton
- Florencia Torche
- Tatiana Toro
- William M. Treanor
- Eve M. Troutt Powell
- Lyudmila N. Trut
- Chizuko Ueno
- Guadalupe Valdés
- Lynn Vavreck
- David G. Victor
- Suzanne Walker
- Kay WalkingStick
- Susan Scholes Wallace
- David Der-wei Wang
- Fan Wang
- Thomas E. Wellems
- Theodore V. Wells, Jr.
- Craig Steven Wilder
- Fred Wilson
- Teresa K. Woodruff
- Ngaire Tui Woods
- Clifford J. Woolf
- Kwesi Yankah
- Mihalis Yannakakis
- Leeat Yariv
- Xiaogang Ye
- Louise Young
- Muhammad Qasim Zaman
- Martin T. Zanni
- Barbie Zelizer

== 2021 ==
- Rafi Ahmed
- Zeresenay Alemseged
- Hilton Als
- José Enrique Alvarez
- Carol Anderson
- James D. Anderson
- James A. Banks
- Zhenan Bao
- Dafna Bar-Sagi
- Gilda A. Barabino
- Deanna M. Barch
- Alice Barkan
- David Stephen Battisti
- Ian Baucom
- John Baugh
- Richard Bauman
- Ruth Behar
- Joan W. Bennett
- Dirk Bergemann
- Cristina Bicchieri
- Terence O. Blanchard
- Thomas Boehm
- P. Dee Boersma
- L. Ebony Boulware
- Kristin Bowman-James
- Pascal R. Boyer
- Susan L. Brantley
- Ronald R. Breaker
- Linda J. Broadbelt
- Jericho Brown
- Nancy J. Brown
- Axel T. Brunger
- Virginia Burrus
- Robert L. Byer
- Hui Cao
- Peter Carmeliet
- Terri Lyne Carrington
- BJ Casey
- Ruth E. Chang
- Teju Cole
- N. Anthony Coles
- Joy Connolly
- Kinshasha Holman Conwill
- Steven J. Corwin
- Kimberlé W. Crenshaw
- Michael M. Crow
- Angela Y. Davis
- Roger J. Davis
- Stefano DellaVigna
- Sharon Y. R. Dent
- Ulrike Diebold
- Mitchell Duneier
- Thu Huong Duong
- Odile Eisenstein
- Azza M.H. El Kholy
- Yakov Eliashberg
- Arturo Escobar
- James A. Estes
- John W. Etchemendy
- Bernardine Evaristo
- Benson S. Farb
- Robert Christopher Feenstra
- Carol A. Fierke
- Israel Finkelstein
- Katherine E. Fleming
- Virginia Page Fortna
- Andrea Gamarnik
- Rodolfo Gambini
- Barbara Geddes
- Ruth Wilson Gilmore
- Ananda Goldrath
- Fritz Graf
- Bernice Grafstein
- Linda G. Griffith
- Sanjay K. Gupta
- Evelynn M. Hammonds
- Michael G. Hanchard
- Nikole Hannah-Jones
- Valerie Hansen
- Maureen R. Hanson
- Demis Hassabis
- Tyrone B. Hayes
- Nathan L. Hecht
- Mary Kay Henry
- Maria L. Hinojosa
- Stephen P. Hinshaw
- Mary Dana Hinton
- Jennifer Homans
- Arthur L. Horwich
- Jeffrey A. Hubbell
- Gregory Huber
- Joseph T. Hupp
- Kaye G. Husbands Fealing
- David Henry Hwang
- Joseph Incandela
- Charles L. Isbell
- Akiko Iwasaki
- Herbert Jäckle
- Lisa P. Jackson
- Sandra Jackson-Dumont
- Arthur Jafa
- Sheila S. Jasanoff
- Sue Jinks-Robertson
- Anthony M. Johnson
- Marcia K. Johnson
- Rucker C. Johnson
- William D. Jones
- Vicky Kalogera
- Paula Kerger
- Robin Wall Kimmerer
- Ronald Kirk
- Perri Klass
- Mary E. Klotman
- Karin D. Knorr Cetina
- Judith Kroll
- Vijay Kumar
- Jane B. Lancaster
- George M. Langford
- Elisabeth Le Guin
- Chang-rae Lee
- Ralph S. Lemon
- Gillian Lester
- Amy-Jill Levine
- Fei-Fei Li
- Patricia Limerick
- Lúcia Garcez Lohmann
- Kelly Lytle Hernández
- Nancy Makri
- Anup Malani
- Luciano A. Marraffini
- Andrew David Martin
- Nader Masmoudi
- Nadya Mason
- Ann S. Masten
- James N. Mattis
- Deirdre N. McCloskey
- Thomas W. McDade
- Elizabeth McNally
- Muriel Médard
- Julie Mehretu
- Teresa H. Meng
- Federica Mogherini
- Valeria Molinero
- Luis Carlos Moll
- Michele Moody-Adams
- Tirin Moore
- Teresa Morgan
- Robert P. Moses
- David A. Moss
- Eileen A. Myles
- Na'ilah Suad Nasir
- Frederick Neuhouser
- Dianne K. Newman
- Michele L. Norris
- Larry Norton
- Kyoko Nozaki
- Jodi M. Nunnari
- Naomi Shihab Nye
- Angela V. Olinto
- Angela Onwuachi-Willig
- John G. Palfrey
- Patricia G. Parker
- Suzan-Lori Parks
- Malcolm J. Perry
- Jonas C. Peters
- Anthony B. Pinn
- Stanley A. Plotkin
- Daniel N. Posner
- Kavita Ramanan
- Jorge G. Ramos Ávalos
- Marilyn Raphael
- Jereldine Redcorn
- Hanna Reisler
- Andrés Reséndez
- Robbie Robertson
- Carol V. Robinson
- Barbara Rogoff
- Hannah Rothschild
- Charles Rotimi
- Kim Sajet
- Richard G. Salomon
- Leona D. Samson
- James Joseph Sandman
- Eric Santner
- Kirk Savage
- Stefan Savage
- Howard D. Schultz
- Kenneth S. Schweizer
- Ruth Scodel
- Rosalind A. Segal
- Mordechai (Moti) Segev
- Margo I. Seltzer
- Rajiv Shah
- Stewart D. Shapiro
- Scott Sheffield
- J. Nicole Shelton
- Yanan Shen
- J. Marshall Shepherd
- Frederick J. Sigworth
- Peter L. Slavin
- Karen E. Smith
- Linda Tuhiwai Te Rina Smith
- Sonya T. Smith
- Victoria L. Sork
- Daniel A. Spielman
- Hortense J. Spillers
- Gayatri Chakravorty Spivak
- Sharada Srinivasan
- Stefanie Stantcheva
- Kumble R. Subbaswamy
- Kara Swisher
- Esther S. Takeuchi
- Deborah F. Tannen
- Kathryn E. Tanner
- Jill Tarter
- Anne M. Thompson
- Ayanna Thompson
- Ginger Thompson
- H. Holden Thorp
- Sarah A. Tishkoff
- Haunani-Kay Trask
- Rosemarie Trockel
- Li-Huei Tsai
- Eric Turkheimer
- Karel van der Toorn
- Geerat J. Vermeij
- Ashvin Vishwanath
- Annette Vissing-Jørgensen
- Keith A. Wailoo
- Vanessa Siddle Walker
- R. Jay Wallace
- Ebonya L. Washington
- Daniel H. Weiss
- Jennifer M. Welsh
- Stephen C. West
- Amie Wilkinson
- Deborah Willis
- Mabel O. Wilson
- Oprah Winfrey
- Paula Wolff
- Catherine S. Woolley
- Dawn J. Wright
- Lawrence Wright
- Hao Wu
- Amir Yacoby
- Nieng Yan
- Deborah J. Yashar
- Anne D. Yoder
- Richard J. Youle
- Paul Zanker
- Kenneth S. Zaret
- Marino Zerial

== 2022 ==
- Alberto Abadie
- Carolyn Abbate
- Kyle Abraham
- Alice Rangel de Paiva Abreu^{IHM}
- Claire Adjiman^{IHM}
- John Agnew
- Maya Ajmera
- Cristina M. Alberini
- John R. Allen
- Walter R. Allen
- Bárbara Arroyo^{IHM}
- Chieko Asakawa^{IHM}
- O. Keith Baker
- W. Mitchell Baker
- Ralph S. Baric
- Jeffrey A. Barrett
- Luiz André Barroso
- Regina Barzilay
- Sven Beckert
- David A. Bell
- Nancy Bermeo
- Christopher R. Berry
- Roman Bezrukavnikov
- Kirsten B. Bibbins-Domingo
- Rena Bizios
- Eve Blau
- Suzanne Preston Blier
- Charles M. Boone^{IHM}
- Susan Bordo
- Richard Gutierrez Bribiescas
- Adriana D. Briscoe
- Joan B. Broderick
- Richard R.W. Brooks
- Wendy L. Brown
- Robert D. Bullard
- Robert Calderbank
- Wendy Carlin^{IHM}
- Marvin A. Carlson
- Bridget O. Carragher
- Nancy Carrasco
- Mary N. Carrington
- Avshalom Caspi
- Gerbrand Ceder
- Guy-Uriel E. Charles
- Erica Chenoweth
- Jamsheed K. Choksy
- Sandra Chung
- Sandra Cisneros
- Glenn Close
- Jonathan D. Cohen
- Carl A. Cohn
- Patricia Hill Collins
- Cesar R. Conde
- Michael B. Cosmopoulos
- Eileen M. Crimmins
- Marian R. Croak
- Panagiota Daskalopoulos
- Peter L. de Bolla^{IHM}
- Carlos del Rio
- Donatella della Porta^{IHM}
- Lynda F. Delph
- Arshad B. Desai
- Anthony Di Fiore
- Christopher R. Dickman^{IHM}
- Thomas A. DiPrete
- Michael F. Doherty
- Michele Dougherty^{IHM}
- Justin Driver
- Jan Willem Duyvendak^{IHM}
- Susan M. Dynarski
- Lauren B. Edelman
- Jennifer Elisseeff
- Naomi Ellemers^{IHM}
- Oskar Eustis
- Michale S. Fee
- Anne Feldhaus
- Teresita Fernández
- Martha Albertson Fineman
- William H. Foege
- Efi Foufoula-Georgiou
- Gordon J. Freeman
- Patricia C. Gándara
- Wilfrid Gangbo
- Mariano A. Garcia-Blanco
- Claudine Gay
- Rhiannon Giddens
- Sam Gilliam
- Sherry Glied
- Yale E. Goldman
- Robert W. Gordon
- Véronique Gouverneur^{IHM}
- David J. Grain
- Virginia Gray
- Wendy Griswold
- Eduardo A. Groisman
- James Gross
- Robert I. Grossman
- Chenghua Gu
- Alice Guionnet^{IHM}
- Miguel Gutierrez
- Hahrie C. Han
- Bernard A. Harris
- Saidiya V. Hartman
- Caroline S. Harwood
- Mark E. Hay
- Rebecca W. Heald
- Peter Hegemann^{IHM}
- Steven Henikoff
- Haruzo Hida
- Bo E. Honoré
- Ayanna M. Howard
- Z. Josh Huang
- Andreas Huyssen
- Richard Ivry
- C. Kirabo Jackson
- Robert B. Jackson
- Suzanne Jackson
- Catherine L. Johnson
- Camara Phyllis Jones
- Marc Bamuthi Joseph
- Shamit Kachru
- Wadad Kadi
- Katalin Karikó
- Sabine Kastner
- Dina Katabi
- Lisa Kewley^{IHM}
- Mark Kisin
- Rachel E. Klevit
- Hank Klibanoff
- Dorothy Y. Ko
- Gabriel Kotliar
- Nicholas A. Kotov
- Diana Slaughter Kotzin
- Leonid Kruglyak
- Alessandra Lanzara
- Jennifer Lee
- Raphael C. Lee
- Tracy S. Letts
- Jacob Lew
- Yiyun Y. Li
- Peter B. Littlewood
- Elisabeth A. Lloyd
- Bette A. Loiselle
- Leonardo N. López Luján^{IHM}
- Joni Lovenduski^{IHM}
- Shelly Lundberg
- Oren Lyons
- Susana A. Magallón Puebla^{IHM}
- James L. Mahoney
- Harmit Singh Malik
- Sally Mann
- Howard S. Marks
- Robert A. Martienssen
- Georges P. Martin^{IHM}
- Tshilidzi Marwala^{IHM}
- Eduardo Matos Moctezuma^{IHM}
- Khaled Mattawa
- Stephen Leon Mayo
- Rafe Mazzeo
- Dwight A. McBride
- Vonnie McLoyd
- Jefferson A. McMahan
- Jill Medvedow
- Ruslan Medzhitov
- Matthew L. Meyerson
- Terrie E. Moffitt
- Jason J. Moran
- Wesley Morris
- S. Harvey Moseley
- Marsha A. Moses
- Fred Moten
- Dambisa F. Moyo
- Sabyasachi Mukherjee^{IHM}
- Andrew G. Myers
- Peter M. Narins
- Richard Neer
- Mae Ngai
- Sianne Ngai
- Jean M. O'Brien
- Karen Oegema
- Oyekunle Olukotun
- Santa J. Ono
- Tracy P. Palandjian
- Rohini Pande
- Maharaj K. Pandit^{IHM}
- Jean William Pape
- Manuel Pastor
- Martha E. Pollack
- Anna Marie Prentiss
- Laura J. Pyrak-Nolte
- Ronald T. Raines
- Ramamoorthy Ramesh
- Zihe Rao^{IHM}
- Ishmael Scott Reed
- Aviv Regev
- David Relman
- Alison F. Richard
- Heather Cox Richardson
- Dorothy E. Roberts
- Beate Roessler^{IHM}
- Pamela C. Ronald
- Elisabeth Rosenthal
- Esteban Rossi-Hansberg
- Daniel I. Rubenstein
- Salman Rushdie
- Buffy Sainte-Marie
- Nicholas Sambanis
- Juan G. Santiago
- Rebecca R. Saxe
- Dietram A. Scheufele
- Bambi B. Schieffelin
- M. Emanuela Scribano^{IHM}
- Jonathan L. Sessler
- Karen C. Seto
- H. Bradley Shaffer
- Nilay Shah^{IHM}
- Adi Shamir^{IHM}
- Joan-Emma Shea
- Nancy Sherman
- Li Shuicheng^{IHM}
- Patricia Smith
- Sara A. Solla
- Nancy R. Sottos
- Johanna Stachel^{IHM}
- Shannon S. Stahl
- Samuel L. Stanley, Jr.
- Jón Steinsson
- Molly M. Stevens^{IHM}
- Anne Marie Sweeney
- Endre Szemerédi
- Elie Tamer
- William F. Tate IV
- Marleen Temmerman^{IHM}
- Hank Willis Thomas
- Kevin Thompson^{IHM}
- Jenny P. Ting
- Maria Todorova
- Virginia L. Trimble
- Nachum Ulanovsky^{IHM}
- Peter S. Ungar
- Leslie G. Valiant
- Alexander van Oudenaarden^{IHM}
- Blaire Van Valkenburgh
- James C. VanderKam
- George Varghese
- Carlos G. Vélez-Ibáñez
- Archana Venkatesan
- Abraham C. Verghese
- Claire Voisin^{IHM}
- Richard J. Walker
- Drew Weissman
- Sandra K. Weller
- Eleanor Wilner
- David Kwabena Wilson
- Suzanne M. Wilson
- Sijue Wu
- Omar M. Yaghi
- Linda T. Zagzebski
- Matias Zaldarriaga
- Ana Celia Zentella
- Min Zhou

== 2023 ==
- Lila Abu-Lughod
- Karen L. Adelman
- David F. Adjaye
- Rexford S. Ahima
- Takuzo Aida^{IHM}
- Linda Martín Alcoff
- George Allanmore Ogarren Alleyne^{IHM}
- Henry E. Allison
- Jean Allman
- Guillermo A. Ameer
- Abdullah T. Antepli
- Alfredo J. Artiles
- Kimberly Atkins Stohr
- Orazio P. Attanasio
- Tanya Atwater
- Mieka Bal^{IHM}
- Ruma Banerjee
- Miroslav Barta^{IHM}
- Tamer Başar
- Sally M. Benson
- Richard L. Berke
- Marlon Blackwell
- Joss Bland-Hawthorn^{IHM}
- John D. S. Booth^{IHM}
- Liliana Borcea
- Claire L. Bowern
- Sonia D. Boyce^{IHM}
- A. Wade Boykin
- Rafael L. Bras
- Henry I. Braun
- Kara L. Bren
- Charles L. Briggs
- James Briscoe^{IHM}
- R. David Britt
- Marilyn A. Brown
- Harriet Bulkeley^{IHM}
- William J. Bynum
- David G. Cahill
- John Campbell
- Maria Campbell^{IHM}
- Maria Magdalena Campos-Pons
- Maria Cancian
- Jian Cao
- Hazel V. Carby
- Marisa Carrasco
- Laura L. Carstensen
- Amitabh Chandra
- Kerwin K. Charles
- Emmanuelle M. Charpentier^{IHM}
- Barbara Chase-Riboud
- Marcia Chatelain
- Leo R. Chavez
- Cynthia Chavez Lamar
- Don Mee Choi
- Morgan Chu
- Deborah Chung
- Danielle K. Citron
- William C. Clark
- Hollis Cline
- Jelani Cobb
- Linda Colley
- Leda Cosmides
- Franklin D. Costantini
- Arnaud Costinot
- Neta C. Crawford
- Mary Croughan
- Cathleen Crudden
- Mirjam Cvetic
- Rafaela Dancygier
- Derrick Darby
- Claudia de Rham^{IHM}
- Amir Dembo
- Reginald DesRoches
- Larry J. Diamond
- Sandra Díaz^{IHM}
- James J. DiCarlo
- Kenneth A. Dodge
- Dalee Sambo Dorough
- Gustavo A. Dudamel
- Aaron P. Dworkin
- Benjamin L. Ebert
- Walter R. Echo-Hawk
- John Echohawk
- Catherine Z. Elgin
- Nader Engheta
- Paula England
- Elizabeth C. Engle
- Alison Etheridge^{IHM}
- Marla Feller
- Julieta Norma Fierro Gossman
- Laurence Fishburne
- Katherine A. Fitzgerald
- Matthew L. M. Fletcher
- Zoltan Fodor^{IHM}
- Sergey Fomin
- Carolyn Louise Forché
- James Forman
- Michael J. Franklin
- Stephanie Fryberg
- Vivian L. Gadsden
- Jorge E. Galán
- Ofelia García
- Antoine M. Garibaldi
- Rosemarie Garland-Thomson
- Peter Gelb
- Ronald N. Germain
- Sankar Ghosh
- Amy S. Gladfelter
- Leonid Glazman
- Peter H. Gleick
- Anita Gonzalez
- Philip Kan Gotanda
- Patricia Frances Grace^{IHM}
- Jane Green^{IHM}
- David D. Hall
- Judith Hamera
- Mohamed Hag Ali Hassan^{IHM}
- Mary Beth Hatten
- Katharine Hayhoe
- Geraldine Heng
- Rodney E. Hero
- Daniel Herschlag
- Wendell T. Hill
- Cindy E. Hmelo-Silver
- Luis C. Ho
- Walter J. Hood
- Chang-Tai Hsieh
- Xuedong Huang
- William C. Hubbard
- Scott J. Hultgren
- Robert A. Hummer
- Charlayne A. Hunter Gault
- Piotr Indyk
- Jacqueline Jordan Irvine
- Major Jackson
- Jonathan D. Jansen^{IHM}
- Virginia Jaramillo
- Sheila Johnson
- Susan Kaech
- Regine Kahmann^{IHM}
- Ilya Kaminsky
- Mercouri G. Kanatzidis
- Lydia E. Kavraki
- Shana O. Kelley
- Dorothee Kern
- Tristram R. Kidder
- Tatsuo Kobayashi
- Eric T. Kool
- Marta Zofia Kwiatkowska^{IHM}
- Michèle Lamont
- Ramón Latorre^{IHM}
- Elizabeth A. LeCompte
- Dung-Hai Lee
- Amy E. Lerman
- Michael Lewis
- Nelson Lichtenstein
- Curtis M. Lively
- Vidya Madhavan
- L. Mahadevan
- Yvonne A. Maldonado
- Emily Mann
- Susan S. Margulies
- Strive T. Masiyiwa
- Maja J. Matarić
- Félix V. Matos Rodríguez
- Heather Maynard
- Ann M. McGrath
- Kathryn S. McKinley
- Kendra McSweeney
- Walter Simon Melion
- Batja Gomes de Mesquita
- Gillian E. Metzger
- Tobias Meyer
- Tiya Miles
- James B. Milliken
- Yair N. Minsky
- Lin-Manuel Miranda
- Magne Mogstad
- Aldon D. Morris
- Salikoko Sangol Mufwene
- Louis J. Muglia
- Harryette Mullen
- Cecilia Muñoz
- Daniel S. Nagin
- Vasudha Narayanan
- Priyamvada Natarajan
- Pamela T. Newkirk
- Patricia Marroquin Norby
- Andre Nussenzweig
- Brendan Nyhan
- Fintan O'Toole^{IHM}
- Shigehiro Oishi
- Jacob K. Olupona
- Henri Orland^{IHM}
- Richard Ovenden^{IHM}
- Thomas G. Palaima
- Sudip Shrikant Parikh
- Muhammad A. Pate
- David Pellman
- James W. Pennebaker
- Ivette Perfecto
- Yakov B. Pesin
- Gordon Plotkin
- Susan E. Quaggin
- Ato Quayson
- Mitchell P. Rales
- Laurence Ralph
- W. Kimryn Rathmell
- Wade G. Regehr
- Shonda Rhimes
- Joan T. Richtsmeier
- Lynette W. Russell
- Alberto E. Saal
- Joachim Sauer^{IHM}
- Richard Schechner
- Erin M. Schuman
- Anna B. Sfard
- Beth Shapiro
- Phillip R. Shaver
- Ali Shilatifard
- Hyun Song Shin^{IHM}
- Susanna C. Siegel
- Amy Sillman
- Mariko E. Silver
- Hazel Christine Simmons-McDonald^{IHM}
- C. Murray Sinclair^{IHM}
- Zadie Smith
- Lilianna Solnica-Krezel
- Keivan G. Stassun
- Carol S. Steiker
- Nils Christian Stenseth^{IHM}
- Wes Studi
- Margaret M. Sullivan
- Nader Tehrani
- Jeanine M. Tesori
- Krista Thompson
- James M. Tiedje
- Senthil Todadri
- Petra E. Todd
- Elizabeth C. Traugott
- Daniel S. Treisman
- Monica G. Turner
- Claudia Turro
- Virginia Valian
- James L. Van Cleve
- Karen Vogtmann
- Susan S. Wallach
- Barbara F. Walter
- Evelyn Wang
- Carol V. Ward
- Risa H. Wechsler
- Jonathan F. Wendel
- E. John Wherry
- Heidi Williams
- M. Roy Wilson
- Barbara Jane Wold
- Stephen Wolfram
- Sandra L. Wolin
- Boleslaw Wyslouch
- Yukiko Yamashita
- Michelle Yeoh^{IHM}
- M. Moti Yung
- Phillip D. Zamore
- Wei Zhang
- Chloé Zhao
- Jizhong Zhou
- Daniel Ziblatt
- Steven J. Zipperstein

^IHM International Honorary Member
