= Ruma (disambiguation) =

Ruma is a town and municipality in Vojvodina, Serbia.

Ruma may also refer to:

== People ==
- Rumaldo Ruma Barbero (born 1971), Spanish comic book artist and musician
- Ruma Banerjee, 20th-21st century Indian professor of enzymology and biological chemistry
- Ruma Chakraborty, Bangladeshi politician
- Ruma Devi (born 1988), Indian social worker, fashion designer and traditional handicraft artist
- Ruma Falk (1932–2020), Israeli psychologist and philosopher of mathematics
- Ruma Pal (born 1941), a former judge of the Supreme Court of India
- Ruma Guha Thakurta (1934–2019), Indian actress and singer
- Abba Sayyadi Ruma (1962–2021), Federal Minister of Agriculture and Water Resources of Nigeria
- Farah Ruma (born 1973), Bangladeshi model and television actress
- Tanya Ruma (born 1993), Papua New Guinean cricketer

== Place ==
- Ruma Upazila, a Upazila in Bangladesh
  - Ruma Union, a Union in Bangladesh
- Ruma, Illinois, a village in Illinois, United States
- Ruma National Park, Nyanza Province, Kenya
- Ruma railway station, Ruma, Serbia

== Other uses ==
- Rumā, wife of Sugriva, a character in Ramayana, an ancient Hindu epic
- Ruma language, spoken in Nigeria
- 23S rRNA (uracil1939-C5)-methyltransferase (RumA), an enzyme
