= John Lis =

John Lis may refer to:

- John B. Lis (1915–1985), American politician in the New York State Assembly
- John T. Lis, professor of molecular biology & genetics
