= Fumihiko =

- Gender: Male

Origin
- Origin: Japanese
- Meaning: Different meanings depending on the kanji used

Fumihiko (written: 文彦 or 文美士) is a masculine Japanese given name. Notable people with the name include:

- Fumihiko Imamura (今村 文彦; born 1961), Japanese academic and engineer
- Fumihiko Maki (槇 文彦; born 1928), Japanese architect
- Fumihiko Moroyama (諸山 文彦; born 1943), Japanese basketball player
- Ōtsuki Fumihiko (大槻 文彦; 1847–1928), Japanese lexicographer, linguist, and historian
- Fumihiko Shimo (志茂 文彦), Japanese anime screenwriter
- Fumihiko Sori (曽利 文彦; born 1964), Japanese film director and producer
- Fumihiko Sueki (末木 文美士; born 1949), Japanese academic and historian
- Fumihiko Tachiki (立木 文彦; born 1961), Japanese voice actor
