= Theresa Mayer =

American nanotechnologist and academic administrator

Theresa Stellwag Mayer is an American nanotechnologist and academic administrator, the Vice President for Research at Carnegie Mellon University. Her academic research has involved the directed assembly of micro- and nano-structures such as nanowire arrays.

== Education and career ==
Mayer studied electrical engineering, with a minor in mathematics, at Virginia Tech, graduating in 1988. She continued her studies in electrical engineering at Purdue University, earned a master's degree in 1989, and completed her Ph.D. in 1993.

She joined Pennsylvania State University as an assistant professor of electrical engineering in 1994, and was promoted to associate professor in 1999 and full professor in 2006. She added a second affiliation as professor of materials science and engineering in 2009, and was named a distinguished professor of electrical engineering in 2012.

In 2014 she began her academic administration career as associate dean for research and innovation at Penn State. She returned to Virginia Tech in 2016, as a professor of electrical and computer engineering and vice president for research and innovation. In 2019 she became professor of electrical and computer engineering and executive vice president for research and partnerships at Purdue University. She was named as vice president for research at Carnegie Mellon University in 2023.

== Recognition ==
Mayer was elected as an IEEE Fellow in 2017, "for contributions to nanomaterials integration and directed assembly".
