= Neer (surname) =

Neer is a surname. Notable people with the surname include:

- Eglon van der Neer (1635/36–1703), Dutch painter of historical scenes.
- Eva Neer (1937–2000), American physician.
- Aert van der Neer (c. 1603–1677), was a landscape painter of the Dutch Golden Age.
- Richard Neer (born c. 1949), American disc jockey.
- Phil Neer (1901–1989), top-ranking amateur tennis player.
