= List of American Academy of Arts and Sciences members =

Following is a list of elected members of the American Academy of Arts and Sciences.

- List of American Academy of Arts and Sciences members (1953–1993)
- List of American Academy of Arts and Sciences members (1994–2005)
- List of American Academy of Arts and Sciences members (2006–2019)
- List of American Academy of Arts and Sciences members (2020–2022)
