= Zoltán Fodor =

Zoltán Fodor may refer to:

- Zoltán Fodor (wrestler)
- Zoltan Fodor (physicist)
