= Eva Neer =

American biochemist

- Born: Eva Augenblick; 1937; Warsaw, Poland
- Died: 2000, age 62; Cambridge, Massachusetts
- Education: Radcliffe College, Columbia University
- Known for: G-protein subunit structure and function
- Spouse: Robert M. Neer
- Fields: Biochemist and cell-biologist
- Institutions: Harvard University

Eva Julia Neer (1937–2000) was an American physician (Columbia University P&S), biochemist, and cell-biology scientist who gained U.S. national research awards (FASEB, 1987; American Heart Association, 1996) for her discoveries on G-protein subunit structure and function. She described the physiological roles of these subunits as an integrated and versatile molecular system of signal transduction for membrane-receptor regulation of cell function. Her research concepts turned her into a world leader in G-protein studies and impinged widely on the general understanding of cell behavior.

== Biography ==
Born Eva Augenblick in Warsaw, she came to New York at age eight with her parents and grew up in Queens and Scarsdale. Neer's family fled Warsaw at war's onset in 1939, emigrated first to Brazil, and soon after to the U.S. In Warsaw, her father had practiced private corporate law, which he was unable to pursue in the US, but her parents inspired in Neer her love for scholarly endeavors. She graduated with honors from Bronxville High School in 1955, being awarded a Regent’s college scholarship by the State Education Department. Augenblick attended Radcliffe College and graduated from Barnard College in 1959. A list of student acquaintances of hers at high school and college would include notable achievers such as economist Fischer Black, psychologist Robert L. Helmreich, and endocrinologist Robert M. Neer whom she married. Neer graduated as a physician at Columbia University in 1963. Three years later, she joined Harvard University where she worked continuously for more than three decades. Neer has been singled out for her "efforts to help women advance up the academic ladder". She died of complications from breast cancer in 2000, survived by her husband and two sons, Robert and Richard T. Neer. A personal account of Neer´s professional life was given by her close colleague David E. Clapham in an obituary note.

== Academic career ==
Neer joined Harvard research staff in 1966. She was appointed Assistant Professor of Medicine in 1976, and full professor in 1991. She was ascribed to the Cardiology Division at Brigham and Women's Hospital. Neer served on the Board of Tutors in Biochemical Sciences at Harvard College, as well as on the Harvard Students Research Committee at the Harvard Medical School. She combined the tools of chemistry, biology, physics and molecular biology to explain how cells interpret the messages they get from light, hormones and neurotransmitters. The author of numerous papers, she was elected to both the U.S. National Academy of Sciences and the Institute of Medicine of the National Academy of Sciences and earned membership in the American Academy of Arts and Sciences and the Polish Institute of Arts and Sciences of America. She was honored with the FASEB prize for basic research in 1987 and the American Heart Association’s basic research prize in 1996. She was also an adviser to the National Institutes of Health.

== Research ==
Neer's early research, performed under the guidance of Guido Guidotti, was devoted to study aspects of hemoglobin chemistry. These included the role of sulfhydryl groups of α and β chains on the quaternary conformation of the molecule. She showed their importance in subunit interface interaction and functional cooperativity for oxygen binding. This binding is an essential property for oxygen transport in blood and is often referred as the Bohr effect.

While still at Guidotti's lab, Neer undertook independent research on the biochemical mechanisms of vasopressin's action on the kidney's distal tubules. She described the purification and kinetic properties of vasopressin-sensitive adenylate cyclase from rat renal medulla. It would be later shown that vasopressin acts through a G protein-coupled receptor. This was the topic of Neer's work for most of her research career.

In order to dissect out different aspects of G protein messaging complexities Neer studied a variety of tissues including the cerebral cortex, rat testicles, pigeon erythrocytes, the heart, the brain, and retina-rods. Some of her most cited research findings include:

- Purification and properties of free and membrane-bound adenylate cyclase (1978)
- Size and detergent binding of adenylate cyclase from bovine cerebral cortex (1978)
- The site of α-chymotryptic activation of pigeon erythrocyte adenylate cyclase (1978)
- Calmodulin activates the isolated catalytic unit of brain adenylate cyclase (1981)
- Location and function of reactive sulfhydryl groups of α subunit 39 (1987)
- Action of G protein subunits on the cardiac muscarinic K^{+} channel (1987, 1988)
- Cloning and differential expression of α-subunit types in human tissues and cell types (1988)
- G-protein α_{s} and α_{o} synthesis in GH_{3} cells (1996)
- Structure-function aspects of activation of PLC by G protein subunits: site mutation studies. (1998)

During the course of her career Neer authored a number of highly cited review articles on structural and functional aspects of G protein and its subunits.

== Awards and honors ==
- Damon Runyon Fellowship from the Cancer Research Foundation in 1973
- American Heart Association Research Achievement Award for Basic Research (1996) together with David E. Clapham
- FASEB Excellence in Science Award 1998
- Elected to the National Academy of Sciences 1998
- Elected to the Institute of Medicine of the National Academy of Sciences 1998
- Earned membership in the American Academy of Arts and Sciences 1997
- Posthumously honored by Harvard Medical School by establishing the Eva Neer Memorial Lecture
