= Kathleen J. Stebe =

American chemical and biomolecular engineer

- Education: BA in Economics, The City College of New York, 1984; MSE and PhD in Chemical Engineering, The City College of New York, 1989
- Known for: Nanostructured Materials Surface and Colloidal Science
- Awards: Member of the National Academy Engineering (2021); Member of the American Academy of Arts and Sciences (2020)
- Scientific career
- Workplaces: Johns Hopkins University; University of Pennsylvania

Kathleen Stebe is a scientist with expertise in nanostructured materials, as well as the science of surfaces and colloids. She is also a professor of chemical and biomolecular engineering at The University of Pennsylvania.

== Education ==
Stebe studied economics at the City College of New York as an undergraduate. She graduated with a Bachelor of Arts in economics in 1984. In 1989, she earned her Master of Science in Engineering and PhD in chemical engineering at the City College of New Yorkunder the guidance of Charles Maldarelli.

== Career and research ==
After earning her PhD, Stebe spent a year in Compiegne, France as a postdoc with Dominique Barthes Biesel. Following her time in France, she became an assistant professor at Johns Hopkins University in 1991. In 1996, Stebe was promoted to an associate professor, and in 2000 she was promoted to professor of chemical and biomedical engineering at Johns Hopkins University, where she stayed until 2008. After leaving Johns Hopkins, Stebe took on the role of department chair of chemical and biomolecular engineering at The University of Pennsylvania. In 2008, she became the Goodwin Professor of Engineering and Applied Science, and in 2012, she was awarded the position of deputy dean for research in the school of engineering and applied science, both positions she still holds today.

Stebe's research is mainly focused on directed assembly in soft matter. Another primary research interests is non-equilibrium interfaces, with applications ranging from microfluidics to nanotechnology from an engineering viewpoint.

== Honors and awards ==
- Elected member of the National Academy of Engineering - 2021
- Elected to the American Academy of Arts and Sciences – 2020
- Society of Scholars – Johns Hopkins University – 2015
- Fellow – Radcliffe Institute for Advanced Study – Harvard University – 2002
- Robert S. Pond Sr. Excellence in Teaching Award – Whiting School of Engineering – Johns Hopkins University – 1993
- American Physical Society Francois N. Frenkiel Award for Significant Contributions in Fluid Mechanics by Young Investigators – 1992
- Stanley Katz Memorial Award for Excellence in Research – Department of Chemical Engineering – City University of New York – 1989

== Selected publications ==
- Pesika, Noshir S.; Hu, Zeshan; Stebe, Kathleen J.; Searson, Peter C. (2002). "Quenching of Growth of ZnO Nanoparticles by Adsorption of Octanethiol". The Journal of Physical Chemistry B. 106 (28): 6985–6990. doi:10.1021/jp0144606. ISSN 1520-6106.
- Pesika, Noshir S.; Stebe, Kathleen J.; Searson, Peter C. (2003). "Relationship between Absorbance Spectra and Particle Size Distributions for Quantum-Sized Nanocrystals". The Journal of Physical Chemistry B. 107 (38): 10412–10415. doi:10.1021/jp0303218. ISSN 1520-6106.
- Nguyen, Van X.; Stebe, Kathleen J. (2002). "Patterning of Small Particles by a Surfactant-Enhanced Marangoni-Bénard Instability". Physical Review Letters. 88 (16) 164501. Bibcode:2002PhRvL..88p4501N. doi:10.1103/PhysRevLett.88.164501. ISSN 0031-9007. PMID 11955235.
