= Karen Adelman =

American biologist

- Education: State University of New York, Buffalo (B.Sc.); Université de Paris VI (Ph.D.)
- Known for: Gene regulation, chromatin, cancer, development
- Scientific career
- Fields: Genetics; Cancer
- Workplaces: Cornell University; National Institute of Environmental Health Sciences; Harvard Medical School
- Academic advisors: John T. Lis
- Website: Adelman Lab

Karen L. Adelman is an American biologist who is the Edward S. Harkness Professor of Biological Chemistry and Molecular Pharmacology at the Harvard Medical School in Boston. The Adelman lab made significant contributions to the field of gene regulation by pioneering genomic studies of RNA polymerase II (Pol II) pausing during early transcription elongation. Their findings fundamentally changed the way we understand the regulation of gene expression.

== Education ==
Adelman completed her undergraduate studies in biology at the State University of New York, Buffalo and earned her Ph.D. in molecular and cellular genetics from the Université de Paris VI in Paris in 1999.

== Career and research ==
In 1999, Adelman underwent her postdoctoral training in the Department of Microbiology and Immunology and the Department of Molecular Biology and Genetics at Cornell University under John T. Lis. In 2005, she founded her laboratory at the National Institute of Environmental Health Sciences (NIH) and earned a promotion to Senior Investigator in 2011. Later, in 2016, she became a professor in the Department of Biological Chemistry and Molecular Pharmacology at Harvard Medical School.

The primary objective of the Adelman laboratory is to understand how cells rapidly yet balanced respond to external signals at the transcriptional and epigenetic levels. To investigate the dynamics of gene expression, the lab employs a blend of genomics, genetics, and biochemistry, with a particular emphasis on examining developmental and immune-responsive systems.

== Awards and honours ==
- 2023 Member of the American Academy of Arts and Sciences
