= Mary Croughan =

American epidemiologist and academic administrator

- Education: University of California, Davis (BS); Johns Hopkins University (PhD)
- Scientific career
- Fields: Public health
- Workplaces: University of California, San Francisco; University of Nevada, Las Vegas; University of California, Davis
- Thesis: Morbidity among breech infants according to method of delivery (1987)

Signature
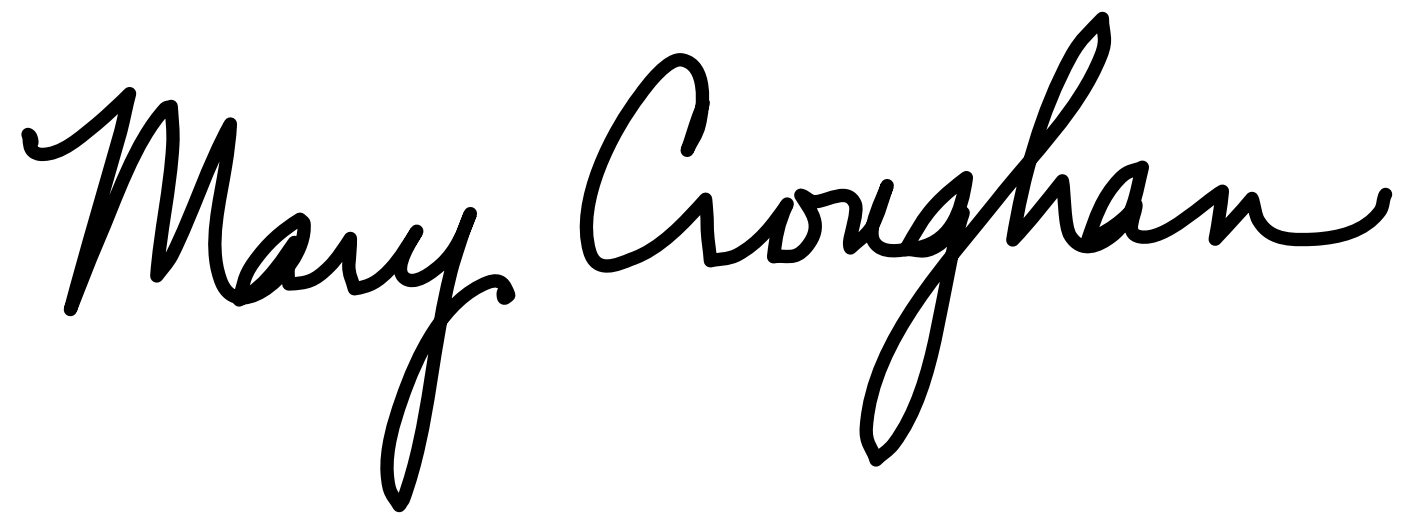

Mary Croughan is an American epidemiologist, currently serving as provost and executive vice chancellor of the University of California, Davis since July 2020.

== Education ==
Croughan received a Bachelor of Science degree with a major in community health from the University of California, Davis in 1982 and a Doctor of Philosophy degree in epidemiology from Johns Hopkins University in 1987. Her doctoral dissertation was titled Morbidity among breech infants according to method of delivery (1987).

== Career ==
Croughan's field of research was on reproductive and perinatal epidemiology.

Croughan was a faculty member at the School of Medicine at the University of California, San Francisco from 1987 to 2017. She served as vice chair of the Department of Family and Community Medicine at UCSF from 1998 to 2004. From 2010 to 2017, she served as the executive director of the Research Grants Program Office under the Office of the President of the University of California.

From 2017 to 2020, Croughan served as vice president for research and economic development at the University of Nevada, Las Vegas. In July 2020, Croughan was appointed provost and executive vice chancellor of the University of California, Davis, succeeding Ralph J. Hexter.

Croughan is a member of the American Academy of Arts and Sciences.
