= Mary Carrington =

American immunologist

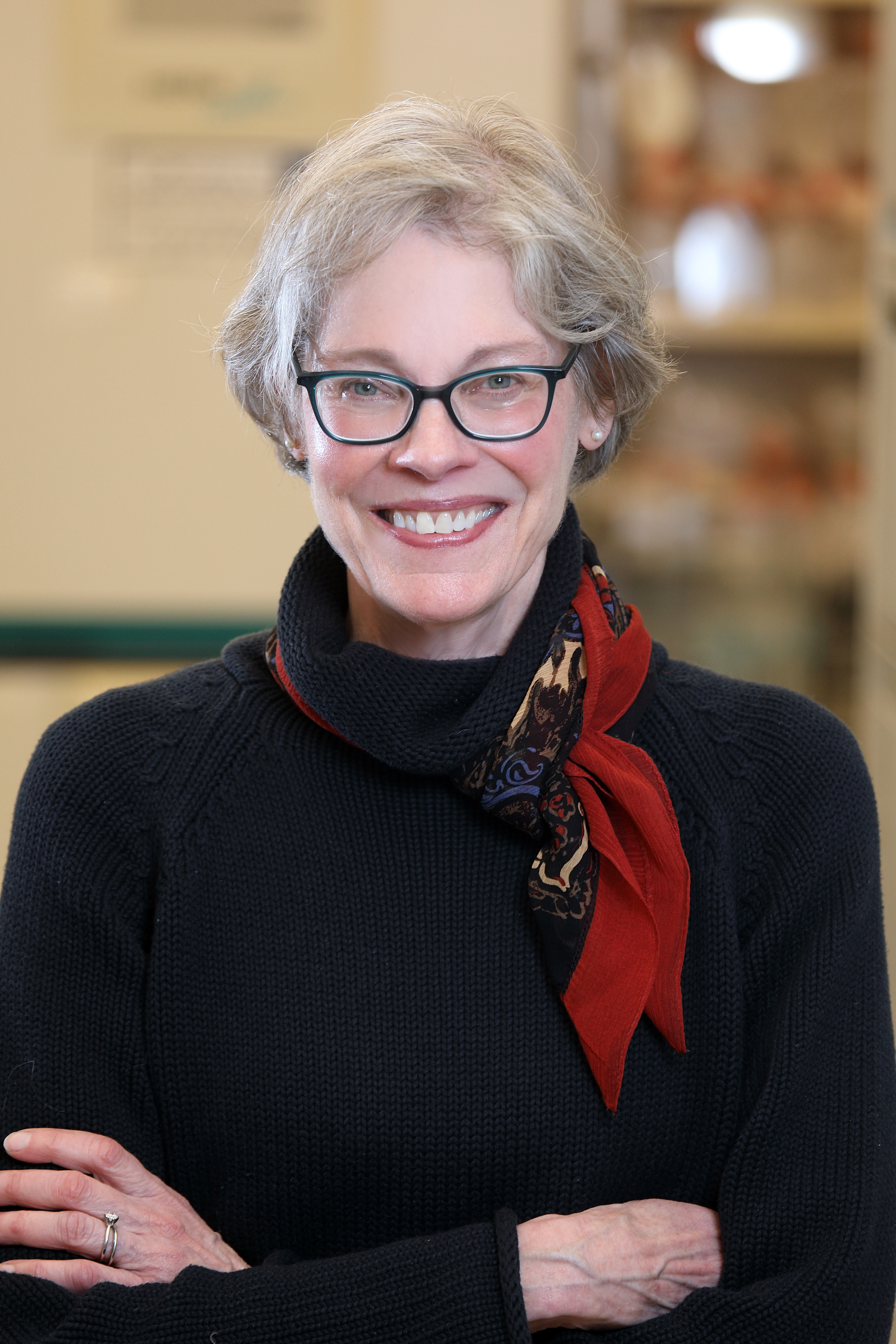
- Education: University of Kansas (BS); Iowa State University (MS, PhD)
- Scientific career
- Fields: Immunogenetics
- Workplaces: Duke University; Frederick National Laboratory for Cancer Research

Mary N. Carrington is an American immunologist researching the role of host genetics in cancer, autoimmunity and infectious disease pathogenesis. She is director of the basic science program and head of the HLA Immunogenetics section at the Frederick National Laboratory for Cancer Research.

== Education ==
Carrington graduated from University of Kansas with a B.S. in education, later obtaining her M.S. and Ph.D. in immunobiology from Iowa State University. She performed her postdoctoral studies in the departments of Immunology and Microbiology at Duke University and the University of North Carolina.

== Career and research ==
Carrington joined the immunology department at Duke University as a faculty member. She moved to the National Cancer Institute at Frederick in 1989. Carrington is the director of the Basic Science Program at the Frederick National Laboratory for Cancer Research, where she is responsible for the guidance and oversight of a large, diverse group of scientists performing investigator-initiated, hypothesis-driven basic research in cancer and AIDS. She is also a senior principal scientist at the National Cancer Institute and heads the Human Leukocyte Antigens Immunogenetics Laboratory in the Cancer and Inflammation Program. Her primary research interests focus on the role of host genetics in cancer, autoimmunity and infectious disease pathogenesis. Her group studies the influence of immunogenetic variation on risk of human disease, outcome to therapeutic treatment, and vaccination. These studies include elucidation of the functional basis for the genetic associations identified. In 2022, she was elected to the American Academy of Arts and Sciences.

== Publications ==
Carrington has been involved with numerous publications relating to her work. In 1996 she published “Genetic restriction of HIV-1 infection and progression to AIDS by a deletion allele of the CKR5 structural gene. Hemophilia Growth and Development Study, Multicenter AIDS Cohort Study, Multicenter Hemophilia Cohort Study, San Francisco City Cohort, ALIVE Study” which discusses the CKR5 gene’s impact on how rapidly HIV progresses. In 2001 she published “The influence of HLA genotype on AIDS” which discusses the relationship between HLA genes and HIV/AIDS. She collaborated on a 2009 paper “Genetic variation in IL28B and spontaneous clearance of hepatitis C virus” which discusses which genes contribute to a person’s ability to clear HCV. In 2015 she published “The impact of host genetic variation on infection with HIV-1” which discusses how HIV expression is impacted by the genetics of the person infected. In 2018 she published “Elevated HLA-A expression impairs HIV control through inhibition of NKG2A-expressing cells” which has been cited numerous times. Also in 2018 she was involved in a clinical trial “Killer cell immunoglobulin-like receptor 3DL1 variation modifies HLA-B*57 protection against HIV-1.” In 2019 she published “Topological perspective on HIV escape” which discusses amino acids and mutation in HIV. “Interleukin-1 polymorphisms associated with increased risk of gastric cancer” is a 2020 paper she published on potential links between certain genetic traits that may influence a person’s risk for some types of gastric cancer. Her 2020 publications also include “HLA tapasin independence: broader peptide repertoire and HIV control” and “HLA-B leader and survivorship after HLA-mismatched unrelated donor transplantation.”

== Awards ==
In 2005 Mary Carrington was awarded the Ceppellini Award by the European Federation of Immunogenetics. Ms. Carrington also received the Rose Payne Award in 2009 from the American Society for Histocompatibility and Immunogenetics. She was also elected to the American Academy of Arts and Sciences in 2022.
