= Edith Chen =

Scientist

- Citizenship: American
- Occupation: Professor of Psychology
- Awards: American Psychological Association Distinguished Scientific Award for Early Career Contribution to Health Psychology; Elected member, American Academy of Arts and Sciences

Academic background
- Education: Harvard University, University of California, Los Angeles (UCLA)
- Website: https://foundationsofhealth.org/

Edith Chen is a scientist known for her research on the psychosocial and biological pathways that explain relationships between low socioeconomic status and physical health outcomes in childhood. She is currently a professor at Northwestern University. Chen received several scientific awards for early career contributions within her first nine years of receiving her PhD. She was awarded the 2015 George A. Miller Award for Outstanding Recent Article on General Psychology for the article “Psychological stress in childhood and susceptibility to the chronic diseases of aging: Moving toward a model of behavioral and biological mechanisms” alongside authors Gregory E. Miller, and Karen J. Parker. In 2020, Chen was elected to the American Academy of Arts and Sciences.

== Biography ==
Chen grew up in Miami, Florida. In high school Chen had an opportunity to work in a research lab, which sparked her interest in science. In 1998 she earned her PhD in Clinical Psychology from University of California, Los Angeles. From 2000 to 2003, she was an assistant professor at Washington University in St. Louis. From 2003 to 2012, she was the Canada Research Chair in Health and Society at the University of British Columbia in Vancouver, Canada. She began her position as Professor of Psychology and Faculty Fellow at the Institute for Policy Research at Northwestern University in 2012. She is currently the John D. and Catherine T. MacArthur Professor. At Northwestern University she spends time doing research and teaching.

== Research ==
Chen's research is centered around understanding the psychosocial and biological pathways explaining socioeconomic differences in health outcomes in children. She and colleagues have proposed multi-level models of contributors to health outcomes, ranging from neighborhood to family to individual to cellular/genomic. Chen's research has contributed to the literature on resilience, that is, the factors that contribute to positive health outcomes among children who grow up under adversity. Overall her findings explore and explain why low socioeconomic status is associated with poorer physical health not only in childhood but throughout adulthood as well, and the factors that can mitigate these outcomes. Chen's research also explores ways in which volunteering or giving support to others can promote better health, as featured on BBC

Chen is known for her theories of shift-and-persist and skin-deep resilience, together with Gregory Miller and Gene Brody. Shift-and-persist describes a coping strategy including adjusting the self to stressful situations through emotion regulation combined with enduring adversity by finding meaning and maintaining optimism. This strategy has been linked to better physical health outcomes in individuals from low socioeconomic backgrounds. Skin-deep resilience is the notion that high levels of striving will be associated with better mental health but poorer physical health particularly among individuals of color who come from low socioeconomic backgrounds. High striving is thought to lead to better academic, occupational, and financial successes which in turn promote better psychological well-being. However, persistent high striving in the face of barriers and obstacles present in low socioeconomic environments leads to physical exhaustion and poorer physical health.

== Representative publications ==
- Chen, E., Matthews, K. A., & Boyce, W. T. (2002). Socioeconomic differences in children's health: how and why do these relationships change with age?. Psychological Bulletin, 128(2), 295–329.
- Miller, G. E., Chen, E., & Parker, K. J. (2011). Psychological stress in childhood and susceptibility to the chronic diseases of aging: moving toward a model of behavioral and biological mechanisms. Psychological Bulletin, 137(6), 959–997.
- Chen, E. & Miller, G. E. (2012). “Shift-and-Persist” strategies: Why being low in socioeconomic status isn't always bad for health. Perspectives on Psychological Science, 7, 135–158.
- Schreier, H. M. C. & Chen, E. (2013). Socioeconomic status and the health of youth: A multi-level multi-domain approach to conceptualizing pathways. Psychological Bulletin, 139, 606–654.
- Schreier, H. M. C., Schonert-Reichl, K. A., & Chen, E. (2013). Effect of volunteering on risk for cardiovascular disease in adolescents: A randomized control trial. JAMA – Pediatrics, 167, 327–332.
- Brody, G. H., Yu, T., Miller, G. E., & Chen. E. (2016). Resilience in adolescence, health, and psychosocial outcomes. Pediatrics, 138, e20161042.
- Chen, E. Brody, G. H., & Miller, G. E. (2017). Childhood close family relationships and health. American Psychologist, 72, 555–566.
- Levine, C. S., Markus, H. R., Austin, M. K., Chen, E., & Miller, G. E. (2019). Students of color show health advantages when they attend schools that emphasize the value of diversity. Proceedings of the National Academy of Sciences, 116, 6013–6018.
- Chen, E., Lam, P. H., Finegood, E. D., Turiano, N. A., Mroczek, D. K., & Miller, G. E. (2021). The balance of giving versus receiving social support and all-cause mortality in a US national sample. Proceedings of the National Academy of Sciences, 118, e2024770118
- Lam, P. H., Chen, E., Chiang, J. J., & Miller, G. E. (2022). Socioeconomic disadvantage, chronic stress, and pro-inflammatory phenotype: An integrative data analysis across the lifecourse. PNAS Nexus, 1, 1–9.
- Chiang, J. J., Lam, P. H., Chen, E., & Miller, G. E. (2022). Psychological stress during childhood and adolescence and its association with inflammation across the lifespan: A critical review and meta-analysis. Psychological Bulletin, 148, 27–66.
- Chen, E., Brody, G. H., & Miller, G. E. (2022). What are the health consequences of upward mobility? Annual Review of Psychology, 73, 599–628.
- Chen, E., Yu, T., Ehrlich, K. B., Lam, P. H., Jiang, T., McDade, T. W., Miller, G. E., & Brody, G. H. (2024). Family disadvantage, education, and health outcomes among Black youth over a 20-year period. JAMA Network Open, 7, e242289.

Additional publications
