= Kirk Savage =

American art historian

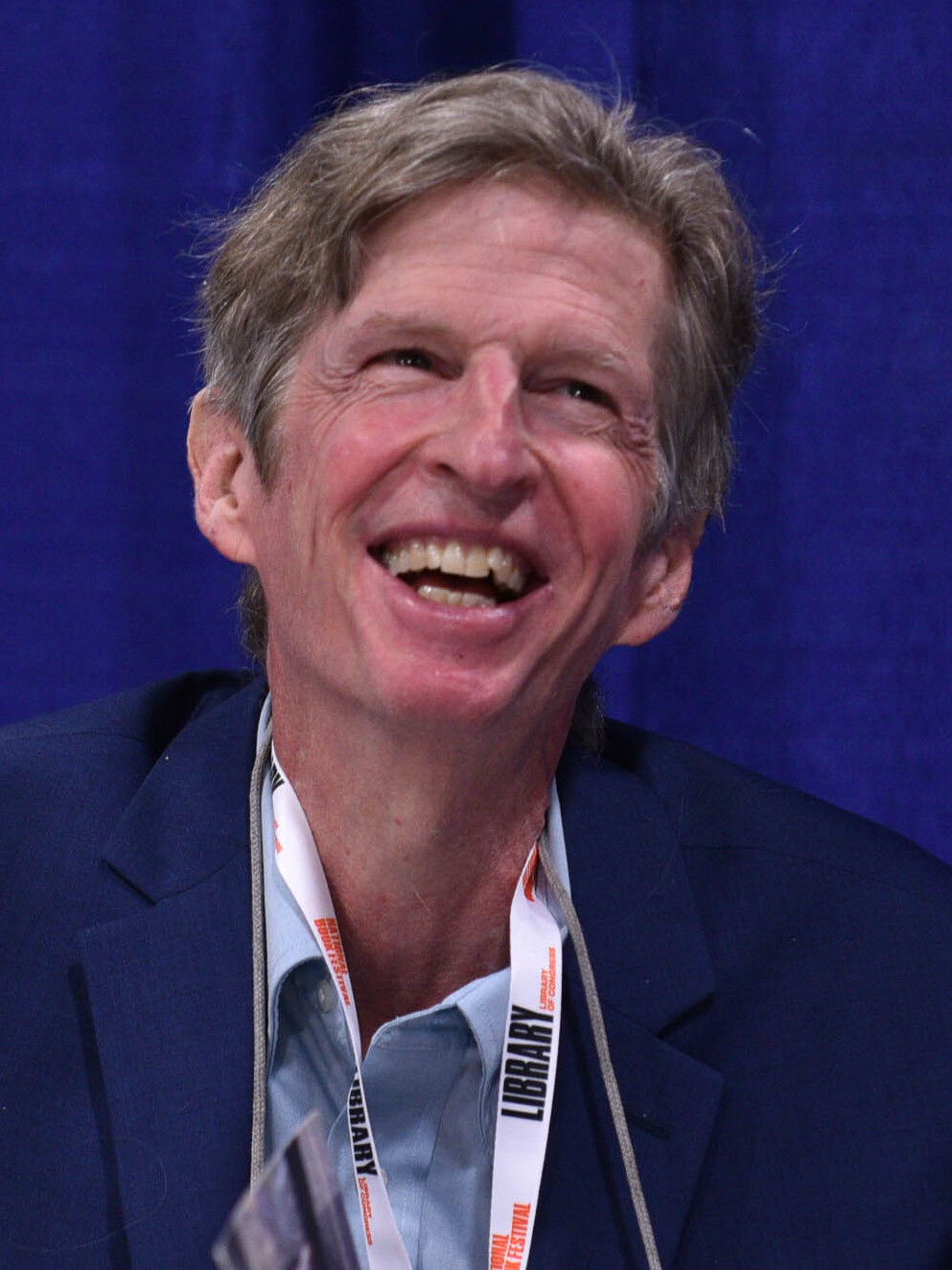
Image of Kirk Savage

Kirk Savage is an American art historian and the William S. Dietrich II Professor of History of Art and Architecture at the University of Pittsburgh. He is best known for his scholarship on public monuments, the memorial landscape of the United States, and the intersection of art with race, memory, and politics. His work has contributed to national conversations about historical memory and the legacy of white supremacy in public art.

== Education and Academic Career ==
Savage earned his Ph.D. from the University of California, Berkeley. He began his career writing about public monuments as a freelancer before pursuing formal training in art history. He joined the University of Pittsburgh, where he has since advised numerous doctoral students and contributed to the development of public art and memory studies as a field of inquiry.

His teaching and research explore topics such as the art of the United States, memory studies, and the social and political functions of monuments. Savage has worked extensively with artists, planners, preservationists, and activists to reexamine the role of public art in shaping collective memory. He is a member of the advisory board of Monument Lab.

== Research work ==
Savage’s work often addresses themes of trauma, deindustrialization, militarism, and racial justice. His approach emphasizes the ethical responsibilities of scholars and artists in grappling with contested histories. Influenced by figures such as James Baldwin and Ta-Nehisi Coates, Savage emphasizes the importance of confronting the complexities of the past.

He has also developed an interest in Indigenous history through collaborations with graduate students and with his wife, Elizabeth Thomas. Their joint project, Unmaking an American Myth: Will Thomas, Yonaguska, and the Cherokees Who Defied Removal, explores the lives of the Cherokee chief Yonaguska and his adopted son, William Holland Thomas.

Another ongoing research project, Buried Identities: Art, Chance, and the Unforeseen Detours of the Civil War Dead, investigates early federal cemeteries and post-Civil War memorial practices through a case study in Pittsburgh.

== Publications ==
=== Books ===
- Standing Soldiers, Kneeling Slaves: Race, War, and Monument in Nineteenth-Century America. Princeton University Press, 1997; 2nd ed. 2018.
- Monument Wars: Washington, D.C., the National Mall, and the Transformation of the Memorial Landscape. University of California Press, 2009.
- Editor, The Civil War in Art and Memory. Washington, D.C.: National Gallery of Art and Yale University Press, 2016.

=== Selected articles ===
- “The Black Man at Lincoln’s Feet: Archer Alexander and the Problem of Emancipation,” Ideas Blog, Princeton University Press, 2020.
- “The Question of Monuments,” Lapham’s Quarterly, 2020.
- “Against Heroism,” in More Art in the Public Eye, Duke University Press, 2020.
- “No Time, No Place: The Existential Crisis of the Public Monument,” Future Anterior, Winter 2018.
- “A Personal Act of Reparation,” Lapham’s Quarterly, 2019.
- “William Holland Thomas and the Myth of the White Chief,” Journal of Cherokee Studies, co-authored with Elizabeth Thomas, 2019.
- Guest Editor, Memorials – War and Peace, Public Art Dialogue, 2012.

== Honors and awards ==
- Winner, John Hope Franklin Publication Prize, American Studies Association (1998)
- Charles C. Eldredge Prize, Smithsonian American Art Museum (2010)
- J.B. Jackson Prize, Foundation for Landscape Studies (2012)
- Chancellor's Distinguished Research Award from the University of Pittsburgh (2013)
- Public Art Dialogue Award (2016)
- Henry-Russell Hitchcock Award, Victorian Society in America (2017)
- Elected member of the American Academy of Arts and Sciences (2021)
