= Rena Bizios =

American bioengineer

Academic background
- Education: BSc, chemical engineering, 1968, University of Massachusetts Amherst; MSc, chemical engineering, California Institute of Technology; PhD, biomedical engineering, 1979, Massachusetts Institute of Technology
- Thesis: Metabolism of arachidonic acid by platelets in hyperlipoproteinemia (1979)

Academic work
- Institutions: University of Texas at San Antonio; Rensselaer Polytechnic Institute

Irene Rena Bizios is an American bioengineer. She is the Peter Flawn Professor at University of Texas at San Antonio and the Lutcher Brown Chair Professor in the Department of Biomedical Engineering. Bizios is an Elected Fellow of the National Academy of Medicine, National Academy of Inventors, American Academy of Arts and Sciences, National Academy of Engineering, and American Institute of Chemical Engineers. Her current interests are cellular and tissue engineering, biocompatibility and tissue-biomaterial relationships.

== Early life and education ==
Bizios is of Greek descent. She completed her bachelor in chemical engineering at the University of Massachusetts Amherst before enrolling at California Institute of Technology for her masters in chemical engineering and Massachusetts Institute of Technology for her Ph.D. in biomedical engineering. Bizios became the first female chemical engineer to receive a Ph.D. in the biomedical engineering program from MIT.

== Career ==
Upon completing her PhD, Bizios accepted a faculty position in the Biomedical Engineering department of Rensselaer Polytechnic Institute (RPI) in 1981. During her tenure at RPI, Bizios found a way of using electricity to grow artificial bones and make them deposit proteins and calcium. She did this by using carbon nanotubes-tubular molecules as electrical conductors to deliver electricity to bone-forming rat cells deposited on a piece of polymer. In 1999, Bizios was elected a Fellow of the American Institute for Medical and Biological Engineering for "outstanding contributions in biomaterials aspects of tissue engineering and for excellent service in biomedical engineering education." The following year, she was inducted as an International Fellow of Biomaterials Science and Engineering of the International Union of Societies for Biomaterials Science and Engineering. In 2002, she took a sabbatical leave to serve as the Chalmers Jubileums Professor at Chalmers University of Technology in Gothenburg, Sweden.

Bizios left RPI in 2006 to become the Peter T. Flawn Distinguished Professor of Biomedical Engineering at the University of Texas at San Antonio (UTSA). During her first three years at UTSA, Bizios was also the Hunter Distinguished Lecturer at Clemson University and the Myrle E. and Verle D. Nietzel Visiting Distinguished Faculty Lecturer at the University of Kentucky.
