= Roger J. Davis =

British-American biochemist

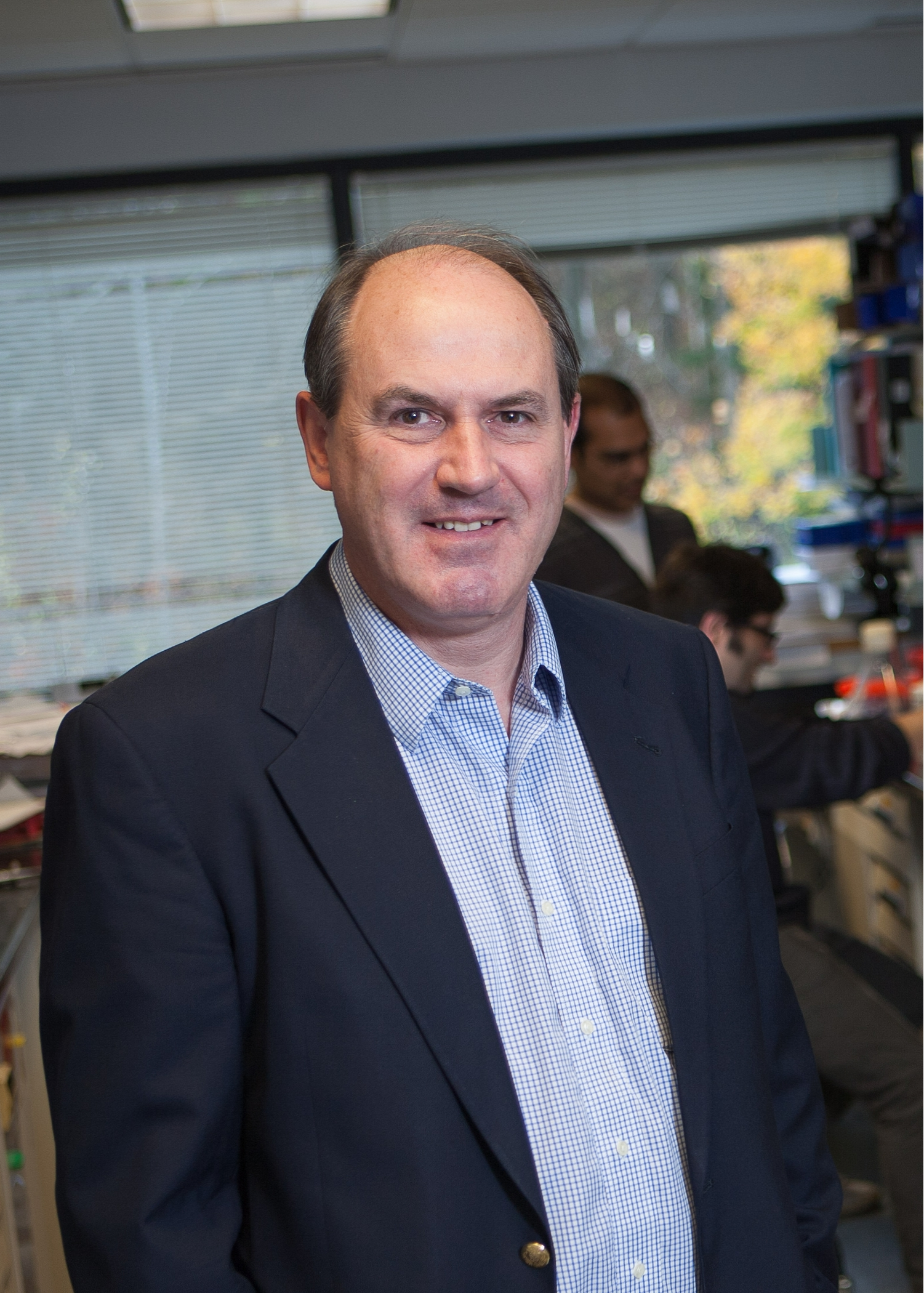
- Roger J. Davis (UMass Chan Medical School)
- Born: Herne Bay, Kent, UK

Academic work
- Discipline: Biochemistry
- Institutions: University of Massachusetts Medical School; Howard Hughes Medical Institute
- Website: davislab.umassmed.edu

Roger J. Davis. is a biochemist and molecular biologist born in Great Britain. He is the H. Arthur Smith Endowed Chair and serves as Professor and Chair of the Program in Molecular Medicine at the University of Massachusetts Chan Medical School. His work focuses on signaling pathways related to cellular stress, including the c-Jun N-terminal kinase (JNK) pathway. Davis molecularly cloned human JNK and has used biochemical, molecular, and mouse model techniques to study the physiological roles and molecular mechanisms of JNK. The goal of his laboratory is to identify molecular targets within stress signaling pathways that can be used to develop treatments for diseases linked to cellular inflammation, including cancer, metabolic disorders, and ischemia, his lab seeks to identify molecular targets within stress signaling pathways.

His recent studies have focused on the role of hepatic JNK in the development of the metabolic syndrome, which includes obesity, steatosis and insulin resistance) caused by the consumption of a high-fat diet. His work investigates the JNK-dependent regulation of the nuclear hormone receptor complex PPARα/RXRα. These studies aim to identify potential therapeutic targets.

== Academic career ==
- Student at Queens' College, Cambridge University, UK: undergraduate student (1976-1979)
- Damon Runyon Post-doctoral Fellow, University of Massachusetts Medical School, Worcester, MA 01655, USA (1984 -1985).
- Assistant Professor, Department of Biochemistry, University of Massachusetts Medical School, (1985 – 1989).
- Associate Professor, Department of Biochemistry, University of Massachusetts Medical School, (1989-1993).
- Investigator, Howard Hughes Medical Institute, Washington, DC, USA (1990 – 2019).
- Professor, Program in Molecular Medicine, University of Massachusetts Medical School, (1993–present).
- H. Arthur Smith Endowed Chair, Program in Molecular Medicine, University of Massachusetts Medical School, (2002–present).
- Chair of the Program in Molecular Medicine at the University of Massachusetts Chan Medical School, (2019-present).

=== Research contributions ===
Roger Davis was involved in the molecular cloning of human JNK, establishing that these kinases are part of the MAP kinase superfamily. In particular, he worked on the stress kinase pathway, a signal transduction mechanism that helps cells sense external stimuli and adapt to changes.

He also contributed to identifying the MAP kinase kinases (MKK4 and MKK7) that activate JNK. Later research showed that pro-inflammatory cytokines and environmental stress trigger the activation of the JNK pathway. His group has used mouse models deficient in JNK1, JNK2, JNK3, MKK4, and MKK7 to study the roles of these kinases in vivo.

Additionally, he has studied transcription factors such as cJun, JunD, JunB, ATF2, Elk1, and NFAT4 that function downstream of JNK signaling. After JNK activation, these proteins play a role in controlling gene expression.

He has reported that JNK activation can cause cell death by apoptosis. This form of death is suppressed by activated AKT. JNK-mediated expression of TNF and JNK-mediated phosphorylation of the BH3-only proteins (Bim and Bmf) contribute to apoptosis caused by JNK activation. This form of cell death occurs during development (e.g. in the central nervous system) and in response to injury (e.g. excitotoxic stress and axotomy). JNK also contributes to tumor cell death and can suppress tumorigenesis.

He has also studied the role of JNK in the metabolic stress response to a high-fat diet. His group showed that JNK in the hypothalamus and pituitary gland suppresses energy expenditure and promotes obesity. In contrast, JNK in peripheral tissues causes insulin resistance. Examples include JNK-mediated inflammation via macrophage M1 polarization and tissue infiltration, hepatic JNK suppression of PPARα-mediated lipid oxidation and FGF21 action, and the role of adipose tissue JNK in modulating insulin sensitivity in both liver and fat tissue. These findings support a key role for JNK in the metabolic response to a high-fat diet.

== Honors and awards ==
- Damon Runyon Post-doctoral Fellow (1984–1985).
- Howard Hughes Medical Institute, Investigator (1990–2019).
- Chancellor's Medal for Excellence in Scholarship, University of Massachusetts Medical School (2012).
- Steven C. Beering Award (2013).

== Elected memberships ==
- Royal Society (London) (2002).
- European Molecular Biology Organization (EMBO) (2010).
- American Academy of Microbiology (2012).
- American Association for the Advancement of Science (2012)
- National Academy of Inventors (2012).
- National Academy of Sciences (2018).
- American Academy of Arts & Sciences (2021).
- National Academy of Medicine (2023).
