= Chenghua Gu =

Professor of Neurobiology

Chenghua Gu is a Professor of Neurobiology at the Harvard Medical School where her research focuses on the Blood–brain barrier. She is also part of the Harvard Brain Science Initiative and has won numerous awards for her groundbreaking research on the brain's vascular component.

== Education ==
Gu earned her Ph.D. at Cornell Medical School. She then joined the lab of David Ginty at the Johns Hopkins University School of Medicine where she studied the role of semaphorin signaling in vascular development.

== Research ==
Gu's research focuses on the development of the blood-brain barrier and its interaction with neuronal networks. She uses experimental techniques such as Two-photon excitation microscopy, mouse genetics and computational models to study neurovascular coupling, the regulation of blood flow by changes in neuronal activity, and vascular patterning. Her laboratory has recently published on the importance of the inhibition of transcytosis for maintaining blood-brain barrier integrity and how the mechanisms regulating transcytosis levels could be manipulated to aid the entry of therapeutics into the central nervous system. Her research has also identified Mfsd2a as a key regulator required for establishing and maintaining blood-brain barrier integrity through its suppression of transcytosis in brain endothelial cells.

== Award and honors ==
- Allen Distinguished Investigator Award, 2018
- Howard Hughes Medical Institute Faculty Scholar, 2016
- National Institutes of Health Director's Pioneer Award, 2014
- Alfred P. Sloan Research Fellowship, 2008
- Whitehall Foundation Award, 2007
- Klingenstein Fellowship Award, 2007
- March of Dimes Foundation Award, 2007
