= Maharaj K. Pandit =

Maharaj K. Pandit is a scholar in the fields of Himalayan ecology, environmental conservation, and sustainability. He currently holds the position of Ngee Ann Kongsi Distinguished Professor at the National University of Singapore. Formerly, he served as the Dean of the Jindal School of Environment and Sustainability and held various leadership roles at the University of Delhi, including as the founding CEO of the Institution of Eminence, Dean and Chair of Research, and Director of the Centre for Interdisciplinary Studies of Mountain & Hill Environment (CISMHE). Pandit has also been a Radcliffe Fellow at Harvard University and an adjunct professor at the University of Rhode Island.

Pandit earned his Ph.D. from the University of Delhi.

== Honors ==
In 2022, Pandit was elected to the American Academy of Arts and Sciences. He is also a Fellow of the Indian National Science Academy (since 2016), the National Academy of Sciences, India (since 2015), and the Linnean Society of London (since 2001).

In 2023, Pandit has been included in Stanford University's 2023 list of the World's Most Influential Scientists.

== Research work ==
Pandit's research centers on exploring the genetic and genomic factors influencing plant rarity and invasiveness, along with assessing how land use and climate change affect human livelihoods, ecosystems, biodiversity, rivers, and water resources. Additionally, he has investigated the consequences of dam construction on Himalayan biodiversity and local communities. His studies have been featured in prominent journals, including Nature, Science, Journal of Ecology, New Phytologist, BioScience, Conservation Biology, Ambio, and Biodiversity & Conservation. His book, Life in the Himalaya: An Ecosystem at Risk, delves into the interactions between natural processes and human activities, examining the connections among geological, climatic, and biological elements, as well as the balance between economic growth and the Himalayas’ environmental capacity.
