= Diana Slaughter Kotzin =

- Born: October 28, 1941 (age 85); Chicago, Illinois
- Occupations: Developmental psychologist, author and academician
- Spouse: Joseph G. Kotzin

Academic background
- Education: B.A. Human Development; M.A. Human Development; Ph.D. Human Development and Clinical Psychology
- Alma mater: University of Chicago

Academic work
- Institutions: University of Pennsylvania (UPenn); Northwestern University

Diana Slaughter Kotzin is an American developmental psychologist, author and academician. She is the inaugural Constance E. Clayton Professor Emerita in Urban Education in the Graduate School of Education at the University of Pennsylvania (UPenn).

Kotzin's research interests include culture, primary education, and home-school relations that facilitate in-school academic achievement. She is a scholar of early childhood development and parental intervention who has contributed to U.S. policy in these areas, with publications including Visible Now: Blacks in Private Schools, Black Children and Poverty: A Developmental Perspective, and Black Educational Choice: Assessing the Private and Public Alternatives to Traditional K–12 Public Schools. She has received awards, including the Black Scholar Achievement Award, Distinguished Contribution Research in Public Policy Award, Lifetime Professional Achievement Award, and the Albert Nelson Marquis Lifetime Achievement Award.

Kotzin is a Consulting Editor of Human Development and was an Associate Editor of Child Development and of NHSA Dialogs. She is an Elected Member of the National Academy of Education, and the American Academy of Arts and Sciences and a Fellow of several divisions of the American Psychological Association, including Developmental Psychology and the Society for the Psychological Study of Culture, Ethnicity, and Race.

== Early life ==
Kotzin was born and raised on the south side of Chicago in a multigenerational household led by her Great-grandmother. Her focus on child development for children of color was shaped by her African American parents' Educational aspirations and her family's experiences with racial issues in the South.

== Education and early career ==
Kotzin earned her B.A. in Human Development from the University of Chicago (UChicago) in 1962, followed by an M.A. in Human Development in 1964. She worked as a Clinical Consultant in Child Psychopathology at the Woodlawn Mental Health Center and served as a Research Associate at the Urban Child Center at UChicago. In 1967, she was an instructor in the Department of Child Development at Kennedy-King College and later served as an instructor in the Department of Psychiatry at Howard University. She completed her Ph.D. in Human Development and Clinical Psychology at UChicago in 1968, receiving the First Pi Lambda Theta Distinguished Research Award for her doctoral thesis.

== Career ==
From 1968 to 1970, she served as a Research Associate and assistant professor of psychology in the Yale Child Study Center at Yale University School of Medicine. She then joined UChicago as an assistant professor of Behavioral Sciences and Education serving until 1977. Moving to Northwestern University, she was an Assistant to associate professor of education from 1977 to 1980. Returning to Northwestern in 1981, she served first as Associate and later as Full Professor of Education and of African American Studies, while also being a Fellow at Northwestern's Institute for Policy Research. She then spent 13 years at UPenn as the Constance E. Clayton Professor in Urban Education at the Graduate School of Education and as a Faculty Associate at the Center for Africana Studies and the Penn Institute for Urban Research. She was a Member of the Forum on Urban Ethnography at UPenn and has been the Constance E. Clayton Professor Emerita at UPenn since 2011.

Within the American Psychological Association, she served as an Elected Member of the Board of Ethnic and Minority Affairs from 1986 to 1989 and as an Elected Member of the Board for the Advancement of Psychology in the Public Interest from 2003 to 2006.

== Research ==
In her early research, Kotzin addressed the underrepresentation and misrepresentation of African American children in academic literature. Influenced by the 1960s political climate and her own reflections, she and her peers focused on African American issues through both academia and community involvement. Her work centered on child development interventions, and examined family and school factors affecting children's achievements. By exploring educational outcomes for children in poverty, she emphasized intervention strategies and educational reform.

Kotzin's work on understanding and improving the educational landscape for Black students has highlighted the challenges and opportunities faced by Black children in various educational settings. She authored Visible Now: Blacks in Private Schools, which offered a look at the educational experiences of Black students in private and parochial schools, shedding light on their impact on educational policy. As the editor of a volume for New Directions for Child Development, she explored theories about Black children at risk of poverty, focusing on how extended families' coping strategies support early development. Her contributions to educational opportunities continued with Black Educational Choice, where she guided African American parents on expanding their K–12 school options beyond traditional public schools.

== Awards and honors ==
- 1987 – Black Scholar Achievement Award, Black Caucus of the Society for Research in Child Development
- 1993 – Fellow, Division 45 American Psychological Association
- 1993 – Distinguished Contribution Research in Public Policy Award, American Psychological Association
- 1997 – Fellow, Division 7 American Psychological Association
- 2007 – Lifetime Professional Achievement Award, The University of Chicago
- 2012 – Elected Member, National Academy of Education
- 2018 – Albert Nelson Marquis Lifetime Achievement Award, Marquis Who's Who
- 2022 – Elected Member, American Academy of Arts and Sciences

== Bibliography ==
=== Selected books/monographs ===
- Slaughter, D. T. (1983). Early intervention and its effects on maternal and child development. Monographs of the Society for Research in Child Development, 48(4), 1–83.
- Visible Now: Blacks in Private Schools (1988) ISBN 978-0313259265
- Black Children and Poverty: A Developmental Perspective (1989) ISBN 978-1555428853
- Slaughter-Defoe, D., Garrett, A., & Harrison, A. (Eds.). (2006). Our children too: A history of the first 25 years of the Black Caucus of the Society for Research in Child Development, 1973–1998. Monographs of the Society for Research in Child Development, 71(1), Series No. 283.
- Black Educational Choice: Assessing the Private and Public Alternatives to Traditional K–12 Public Schools (2011) ISBN 978-0313393839

=== Selected articles ===
- Slaughter‐Defoe, D. T., Nakagawa, K., Takanishi, R., & Johnson, D. J. (1990). Toward cultural/ecological perspectives on schooling and achievement in African‐and Asian‐American children. Child development, 61(2), 363–383.
- Slaughter-Defoe, D. T. (1995). Revisiting the concept of socialization: Caregiving and teaching in the 90s—A personal perspective. American Psychologist, 50(4), 276.
- Slaughter-Defoe, D. T., & Carlson, K. G. (1996). Young African American and Latino children in high-poverty urban schools: How they perceive school climate. Journal of Negro Education, 60–70.
- Zhang, D., & Slaughter-Defoe, D. T. (2009). Language attitudes and heritage language maintenance among Chinese immigrant families in the USA. Language, culture and curriculum, 22(2), 77–93.
- Adams-Bass, V. N., Stevenson, H. C., & Kotzin, D. S. (2014). Measuring the meaning of Black media stereotypes and their relationship to the racial identity, Black history knowledge, and racial socialization of African American youth. Journal of Black Studies, 45(5), 367–395.
