= Amy E. Lerman =

Political scientist

Amy E. Lerman is a political scientist specializing in public opinion, race, and political behavior. She is the Michelle Schwartz Professor of Public Policy and Political Science in the Goldman School of Public Policy at the University of California, Berkeley.

== Education ==
Lerman earned a B.A. in Social Policy and Political Science from New York University and an M.A. and Ph.D. in Political Science from the University California, Berkeley.

== Career ==
After an assistant professorship at Princeton University, Lerman took up the posts of Assistant Professor, Associate Professor, and full Professor of Public Policy and Political Science at the University of California, Berkeley. Currently, she holds the Michelle Schwartz Professorship of Public Policy and Political Science and serves as the Executive Director of the Possibility Lab.

In 2023, Lerman was elected to the American Academy of Arts and Sciences.

== Research ==
Lerman is an expert in criminal justice, health policy, political psychology, race and ethnicity and public opinion. Her first book, The Modern Prison Paradox: Politics, Punishment and American Community, was published in 2013 by Cambridge University Press.

== Publications ==
- The Modern Prison Paradox: Politics, Punishment and American Community. Cambridge University Press. 2013.
- Lerman, Amy E.; Weaver, Vesla M. (2014). Arresting Citizenship: The Democratic Consequences of American Crime Control. University of Chicago Press.
- Good Enough for Government Work: The Public Reputation Crisis in America (And What We Can Do to Fix It). Chicago: The University of Chicago Press, 2019.

== Awards ==
- Woodrow Wilson Foundation Award, American Political Science Association (APSA)
- Gladys M. Kammerer Award, American Political Science Association (APSA)
- Best Book Award (with Vesla Weaver), Urban Politics Section, American Political Science Association (APSA)
- 2025 Andrew Carnegie Fellow
