= Kenneth Zaret =

American biologist

Kenneth S. Zaret
- Born: March 7, 1955 (age 71)
- Education: University of Rochester
- Scientific career
- Fields: Biology
- Workplaces: University of California, San Francisco (1982-1985); Brown University (1986-1999); University of Pennsylvania (1999-)

Kenneth S. Zaret (born March 7, 1955) is a professor in the Department of Cell and Developmental Biology at the Perelman School of Medicine, University of Pennsylvania, and Director of the Institute for Regenerative Medicine at UPenn. He is a recipient of the Hans Popper Basic Science Award from the American Association for the Study of Liver Diseases and the American Liver Foundation, a fellow of the American Association for the Advancement of Science, and a member of the American Academy of Arts and Sciences, the European Molecular Biology Organization, and the National Academy of Sciences.

== Career ==
Zaret developed an interest in the natural world when he was growing up, and while in high school, he gained a fellowship from the National Science Foundation to do some research at a medical school in Philadelphia. This introduced him to laboratory science, and eventually to biology and biochemistry at college. Zaret gained his BA in Biology and then a PhD in Biophysics at the University of Rochester. After postdoctoral research at the University of California, San Francisco, Zaret moved to Brown University in 1986, where he worked first in the Biochemistry section, and later in the Department of Molecular Biology, Cell Biology, and Biochemistry at Brown University Medical School. In 1999, Zaret moved to the Basic Science Division at the Fox Chase Cancer Center in Philadelphia.

== Research ==
As a graduate student with Fred Sherman at the University of Rochester School of Medicine (1977-1982), Zaret discovered that when genes in DNA are transcribed into messenger RNA (mRNA), signals in the DNA cause a coupled termination of transcription and processing of the mRNA by polyadenylation. As a postdoctoral fellow with Keith Yamamoto at the University of California, San Francisco (1982-1985), Zaret discovered that when the steroid receptor for glucocorticoid becomes activated by hormone, the receptor loosens up the local chromosome structure at target genes that then become activated.

Zaret's laboratory investigates the ways that genes are activated and different cell types are specified in embryonic development, regenerating tissues, and disease. His group initially focused on the dynamics of cell signaling, gene regulatory proteins, and chromosome structure in the early mammalian embryo, and the development of the liver. His laboratory discovered embryonic signals that induce the formation of the liver, that there is a bipotential precursor population in the embryo for the liver and pancreas, and that primitive blood vessel cells, before they form blood vessels, signal to early liver cells to develop morphologically into the liver. The findings from his laboratory have been used by other laboratories to engineer new liver cells and liver tissue from stem cells.

His laboratory discovered and named pioneer transcription factors that can bind to compacted chromosome domains harboring silent genes, and that enable cooperative events with other proteins to allow silent genes to turn on. The mechanism of targeting of silent, compacted chromosome domains by pioneer factors has since been found by many laboratories to control the earliest stages of embryonic development and enable cell fate switching in development, regeneration, and human cancers.

Zaret's laboratory revealed an unexpectedly dynamic nature of the most compacted form of chromosome structure, called heterochromatin, during embryonic development. They also found that the H3K9me3 subtype of heterochromatin is the most repressive form to overcome when reprogramming cell fates. These findings can be applied to controlling cell fates at will for modeling human disease and developing cell-based therapies.
