= Arnaud Costinot =

French-American economist

Arnaud Costinot (born January 17, 1978) is a French-American economist. He is the Ford Professor of Economics at the Massachusetts Institute of Technology. He was elected a member of the Econometric Society in 2021, and of the American Academy of Arts and Sciences in 2023. Costinot is known for his work in trade theory.

== Career ==
He was a professor from 2005 to 2008 at the University of California, San Diego, before joining at MIT. He received his Ph.D. in Economics from Princeton in 2005.

== Work ==
Costinot is best known for his 2012 paper “New Trade Models, Same Old Gains?” with Costas Arkolakis and Andres Rodriguez-Clare. The increasing availability of firm-level microdata allowed economists to be much more specific in their predictions about trade. Firms are heterogenous, and vary widely in their production functions. The Melitz model of trade, and its later extension with Ottoviano, predicts that when the cost of exporting falls, the more efficient firms take advantage of it. They benefit more from the expansion in market size than they are hurt by the increase in competition.

Arkolakis, Costinot, and Rodriguez-Clare showed that, for a large class of trade models including Eaton and Kortum (2002), Krugman (1980), and Melitz (2003) the gains from trade depend only on the share of expenditure on domestic goods, and the elasticity of imports with respect to trade costs. Plugging in estimates for those two parameters gives a range of the gains from trade of .7-1.4 percent. With the Melitz model, these results hold under conditions of a Pareto distribution of firm productivity.

Arkolakis, Costinot, and Rodriguez-Clare, with Dave Donaldson, extended their work to analyze the gains from trade under variable markups, in "The Elusive Pro-Competitive Effects of Trade". The gains from a country opening up their markets to trade may increase competition, and reduce the markups of domestic firms. On the other hand, foreign firms might be able to increase their markups. When we drop the assumption of CES utility (which necessitates constant markups), the welfare impact can by summarized by a constant multiplied by the welfare impact of trade under CES utility. Plugging in parameter estimates shows that opening trade need not improve allocation. The positive change to domestic firms is offset by the negative change to foreign firms.

Costinot and Donaldson, looked at the effects of the economic integration of the United States on agriculture more generally, using a dataset of the potential productivity of every section of land for every crop in the United States. This allowed them to estimate the optimal combination of crops absent trade barriers, and calculate how far trade barriers prevent optimal outcomes. They reported that up to 80% of the economic growth of agriculture between 1880 and 1997 was due to trade. Costinot and Donaldson, with Cory Smith, scaled this globally and applied it to climate change. The reported that allowing production patterns to adjust would substantially mitigate damages to crops, with international trade having only a limited role. Costinot and Donaldson also used this dataset to report that Ricardian comparative advantage explains the pattern of agricultural trade around the world.
