= Winnifred Fallers Sullivan =

American author and university professor

Winnifred F. Sullivan is an American author and a professor in the Department of Religious Studies at Indiana University Bloomington in Bloomington, Indiana, United States. She has taught such courses as The Politics of Religious Freedom, Interpreting Religion, The Trial of Joan of Arc, and Christmas: The Church-State History of the World's Most Popular Holiday. She is also the Affiliate Professor of Law in the Maurer School of Law. Her research primarily focuses on how modern religion has shaped law, the Anthropology of law and a comparative notion between Law and Society. She is on the editorial board of the Religion and Society series at De Gruyter and is on the executive committee of the American Society for the Study of Religion and the Law.

Sullivan has done interviews with Radio Canada, Religious Studies News and the New Book in Religion. Her most well known work includes the books of Ekkiesia: Three Inquiries in Church and State and the Politics of Religious Freedom. Her most well known published article is a review essay on "Going to Law: Reflections on Law, Religion as well as Mitra Sharafi's Law and identity in Colonial South Asia".

== Education ==
Sullivan completed her Bachelor of Arts degree in Theatre Arts at Cornell University in 1971. She had earned her J.D. at the University of Chicago in 1976, where she then received her Ph.D. in the History of Religions/History of Christianity at the University of Chicago in 1993. She has received grants from several institutions who have funded her research and education:

- 1997: Class of '65 Endowment for Excellence in Teaching Grant, Washington & Lee University
- 1997: Gleen Grant for Summer Research, Washington University & Lee University
- 1999: Gleen Grant for Summer Research, Washington University & Lee University
- 2008: The Baldy Center for Law & Social Policy Conference Grant
- 2009: The Baldy Center for Law & Social Policy Conference Grant
- 2009: American Academy of Religion and Research Grant
- 2010: The Baldy Center for Law & Social Policy Conference Grant
- 2009-2016: Social Sciences and Humanities Research Council
- 2010-2014: The Luce Foundation Workshop Grant ($500K)
- 2014: The Luce Foundation Workshop Grant "Normalizing Religion"
- 2016-2019: The Luce Foundation Co-PI ($390k)
- 2017-2018: College Arts & Humanities Institute. Indiana University ($6500)

== Career ==
Sullivan began working as an assistant costume designer at the Cornell University Theatre Department from 1971 to 1973. She then became a research assistant in the University of Chicago Law School Sentencing Project. Her work in religious studies began in 1994, where she worked as an assistant professor in the Department of Religion at Washington and Lee University until 2000. From 2000 to 2005, she was the Dean of Students and Senior Lecturer in the Anthropology and Sociology of Religion department in the University of Chicago Divinity School. After this, she became an associate professor of law at the University at Buffalo Law School from 2006 to 2010. She was promoted to become a professor of law at the same institution from 2010 to 2012. Currently, she is working as a professor in religious studies at Indiana University Bloomington.

Sullivan wrote her first book, Paying the Words Extra: Religious Discourse in the Supreme Court of The United States in 1994. Her latest work includes the book of Politics of Religious Freedom published in 2015. She also has a blog under the title of The Immanent Frame, where she talks about real life issues that arises in society and how they interconnect with religion and law.

== Publications ==
=== Books ===
- Paying the Words Extra: Religious Discourse in the Supreme Court of the United States. Cambridge: Harvard University Center for the Study of World Religions (1994).
- The Impossibility of Religious Freedom. Princeton: Princeton University Press (2005; new edition with new preface by author, 2018).
- Prison Religion: Faith-based Reform and the Constitution. Princeton: Princeton University Press (2009).
- A Ministry of Presence: Chaplaincy, Spiritual Care, and the Law. Chicago: The University of Chicago Press (2014).

== Awards ==
Sullivan received the AAR Book Award for Excellence in the analytical-descriptive studies category in 2015. In 2017, she was nominated for the 2018 Louisville Grawemeyer Award in Religion. She won The Martin E. Marty Award for the Public Understanding of Religion in 2017, which was awarded by the American Academy of Religion.
