= Vidya Madhavan =

Indian-American physicist

- Education: Indian Institutes of Technology; Boston University
- Scientific career
- Workplaces: Boston College; University of Illinois Urbana-Champaign; University of California, Berkeley

Vidya Madhavan is an Indian American physicist who is Professor of Condensed Matter at the University of Illinois Urbana-Champaign. Her research considers the spin and charge of quantum materials. She combines high resolution characterization techniques with precise fabrication and growth techniques. She was elected Fellow of the American Physical Society in 2015.

== Early life and education ==
Madhavan studied metallurgical engineering at the Indian Institutes of Technology. She remained there for her graduate studies, where she worked on solid state physics and materials science. She moved to the United States for her doctoral research, where she joined Boston University. After earning her PhD, Madhavan joined the University of California, Berkeley as a postdoctoral researcher.

== Research and career ==
In 2002 Madhavan was appointed to the faculty at Boston College, where she found that phonons (lattice vibrations) were involved in superconductivity. She moved to the University of Illinois Urbana-Champaign as a professor in 2014. Her research considers the interaction between spin, charge and structure in quantum materials. She has developed (spin-polarized) scanning tunnelling microscopy to understand emergent phenomena in unconventional superconductors, topological systems and two-dimensional materials. She has studied unconventional superconductors (with a focus on chiral superconductors), which maintain their superconductivity when in the presence of high magnetic fields likely due to the presence of Majorana particles on their surfaces. Madhavan used STM to identify these Majorana quasiparticles on the surface of uranium ditelluride.

Topological insulators exhibit spin momentum locking, a quantum phenomenon in which the spin of an electron depends on its direction of travel. Madhavan has observed spin-polarized tunnelling in anti-feromagnets.

Madhavan has pursued quantum systems with long lifetimes for quantum information science. She is particularly interested in Mott insulators, which can be fabricated using exfoliation and controlled using lithography. She has demonstrated that they can achieve lifetimes of a few seconds at room temperature.

== Awards and honors ==
- 2015 Elected Fellow of the American Physical Society
- Fellow of the Canadian Institute for Advanced Research
- 2020 Gordon and Betty Moore Foundation Fellow
- 2023 Appointed Member of the American Academy of Arts and Sciences
- 2026 was elected to the National Academy of Sciences

== Selected publications ==
- Madhavan V V; Chen W; Jamneala T; Crommie MF; Wingreen NS (1 April 1998). "Tunneling into a single magnetic atom: spectroscopic evidence of the kondo resonance". Science. 280 (5363): 567–569. Bibcode:1998Sci...280..567M. doi:10.1126/science.280.5363.567. ISSN 0036-8075. PMID 9554843. Wikidata Q32066854.
- Hoffman JE; Hudson EW; Lang KM; Madhavan V; Eisaki H; Uchida S; Davis JC (1 January 2002). "A four unit cell periodic pattern of quasi-particle states surrounding vortex cores in Bi2Sr2CaCu2O8+delta". Science. 295 (5554): 466–469. arXiv:cond-mat/0201348. doi:10.1126/science.1066974. ISSN 0036-8075. PMID 11799234. Wikidata Q46861234.
- Lin Jiao; Sean Howard; Sheng Ran; et al. (25 March 2020). "Chiral superconductivity in heavy-fermion metal UTe2". Nature. 579 (7800): 523–527. arXiv:1908.02846. doi:10.1038/s41586-020-2122-2. ISSN 1476-4687. PMID 32214254. Wikidata Q90665382.
