= Ruma Devi =

Indian fashion designer (born 1989)

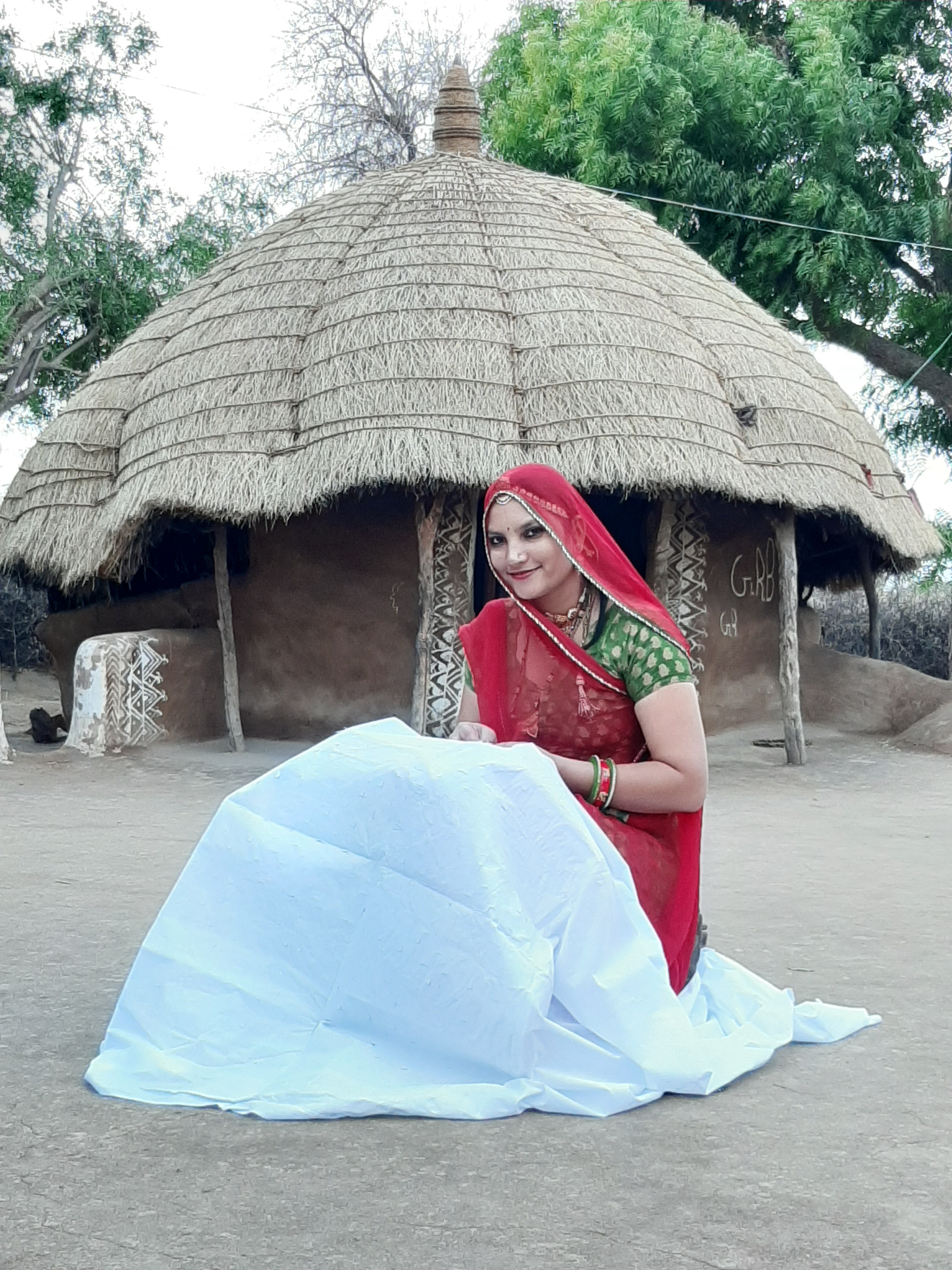
- Born: 16 November 1988 (age 37); Rawatsar
- Education: Honored with an honorary doctorate degree
- Occupation: Social Activist
- Spouse: Tiku Ram (m. 2005)
- Awards: Nari Shakti Puraskar (2019)
- Website: www.rumadevi.com

Dr. Ruma Devi is an Indian traditional handicraft designer, social worker and global speaker from Barmer, Rajasthan. She is President of Gramin Vikas Evam Chetna Sansthan (GVCS) and Director of the Ruma Devi Foundation, organisations working towards women’s empowerment, rural livelihoods and craft revival in India. Having trained and supported 50,000 women artisans across the Thar region, she currently acts as Brand Ambassador of RAJEEVIKA (Rajasthan Livelihoods Mission) under the Government of Rajasthan.

Ruma Devi received the “Nari Shakti Puraskar 2018”, India’s highest civilian honour for women, in recognition of her contribution to women’s empowerment and rural enterprise development. She has also been invited by institutions such as Harvard University to speak on women’s entrepreneurship and artisan livelihoods.

Through her organisations, she has led initiatives that integrate skill development, design innovation and market linkages for rural artisans, creating sustainable livelihood opportunities. She has also promoted access to education through the Akshara Scholarship Programme which supports under-privileged students to pursue higher education.

Her work has been widely recognised for contributing to grassroots social empowerment in western Rajasthan, particularly in enhancing women’s financial inclusion, decision-making and participation in community development.

== Early and personal life ==
Ruma Devi was born in 1988 and grew up in Rawatsar in Barmer, Rajasthan. She dropped out of school when she was in 8th class. She learned embroidery from her grandmother during her childhood. She got married at the age of 17 and lost her first son in 48 hours of his birth.

== Social work and activism ==
Ruma Devi’s social work programmes in education, health, women’s hygiene, infrastructure, and cultural preservation. Key initiatives include:

- Akshara Scholarship: Financial aid and mentorship provided annually to rural students, especially girls, to support academic and professional development.
- Rural Sports Infrastructure: Construction of Barmer’s first rural multi-sports complex (Sugani Devi Sports Complex) with investment of several crores, intended to train youth, particularly girls, for state and national level sports.
- Visualities and Culture Preservation: Events like Vanee Utsav recognizing folk and traditional music across artists; promotion of artisan craft via exhibitions; reviving folk art traditions.
- Menstrual Hygiene Campaign & Sanitary-Pad Distribution: Free sanitary pads are distributed across remote villages (e.g. Barmer, Balotra, Tilwara), accompanied by awareness sessions on menstrual hygiene, safe usage, disposal, and breaking taboos.
- Eye-Screening Camps: Mobile eye-test camps across dozens of gram panchayats, with free eyewear provided to artisans, children, elderly, to reduce avoidable visual impairment. Over 60,000 people have benefited between 2020-2024.
- Project Chirag: Distribution of solar-powered lights to households in electricity-deprived areas, illuminating over 2,000 rural homes.
- Relief & Essential Services: During COVID-19, provision of sanitising kits to over 16,500 families, ration kits to over 3,000, oxygen equipment to more than 25 Primary Health Centres (PHCs) and Community Health Centres (CHCs). Water-tanker relief to drought-hit villages.

Ruma Devi’s activism for women’s rights extends beyond artisan livelihood, encompassing advocacy around gender equality, social justice, and women’s safety. Coming from Barmer, Rajasthan, a region marked by traditional patriarchy, she has worked to challenge norms such as purdah and limited female mobility by mobilising women into self-help groups and encouraging their participation in public life. She has also led educational interventions, pushing for girl child education and organising scholarships to reduce barriers for girls, especially school dropouts. Ruma Devi Foundation In public forums and cultural events (such as Vani Utsav and Harjas Utsav), she uses platforms to highlight women’s rights and foster community among women, which functions both as empowerment and collective awareness-raising. Web India News Her work was formally recognised by the Government of India when she was awarded the Nari Shakti Puraskar in 2019, affirming her contributions to women’s empowerment.

== Career ==
She started to do some work for earning. She started a self-help group after managing to convince about 10 women from her village in 2006. With a contribution of Rs 100 from each woman, they bought second-hand stitching machine, cloth, threads and plastic wrappers for making cushions and bags.

Her quest for success took her to the doorstep of Gramin Vikas Evam Chetna Sansthan in Barmer and she joined it as a member in 2008 and went on to become the president of the non-governmental organization in 2010. She did her first exhibition in Rafi Marg, Delhi in 2010 and her first fashion show in Rajasthan Heritage Week 2016. She is now working towards promoting the craft of tribal artisans and minorities of all over India to get their craft and hands behind craft recognized.

== Awards and honors ==
- Nari Shakti Puraskar (2018) presented by the President of India Sh.Ramnath Kovind.
- Shared stage with Amitabh Bachchan and Sonakshi Sinha on Kon Banega Crorepati Show (20 September 2019).
- Invited by Harvard University, Boston, U.S. as a panelist in its 17th all India conference (15-16 February 2020).
- Featured in Khaleej Times, Dubai
- Featured at Indian singing reality show 'Indian Idol' in the special episode of Women's day (10 July 2021).
- Won the title of 'TFI Designer of the year 2019'.
- Featured on the cover page of India Today magazine in its anniversary edition with the title 'The New Bharat' in 2018.
- State Brand Ambassador, Rajeevika
