= Batja Mesquita =

Dutch social psychologist, cultural psychologist, and affective scientist

Batja Gomes de Mesquita
- Born: 1960 (age 65–66); Amsterdam, the Netherlands
- Education: University of Amsterdam, University of Michigan
- Known for: Theory of socio-cultural construction of emotions
- Scientific career
- Fields: social psychology, cultural psychology, affective sciences
- Thesis: (Ph.D. 1993)
- Doctoral advisor: Nico H. Frijda
- Website: https://ppw.kuleuven.be/cscp/batjamesquita

Batja Gomes de Mesquita (born 1960) is a Dutch social psychologist, a cultural psychologist and an affective scientist. She is a professor of psychology at the University of Leuven, Belgium, where she studies the role of culture in emotions, and of emotions in culture and society. She is director of the Center for Social and Cultural Psychology in Leuven.

== Early life and education ==
Mesquita was born in Amsterdam in 1960 to Jewish Dutch parents who had survived the World War II in hiding. Her father, Albert Gomes de Mesquita was a class mate of Anne Frank. Her mother, Lien de Jong, was orphaned in the war. Both parents were educated, and the family lived a comfortable middle-class life. Mesquita has two younger brothers.

Mesquita obtained a bachelor's degree in psychology and a bachelor's degree in philosophy at the University of Amsterdam. She obtained a master's degree in experimental psychology from the same university, focusing her master thesis on gender differences in emotions. During her Ph.D. in psychology, she developed her initial insights in the role of culture for emotions. Mesquita spent her postdoc years at the University of Michigan, where she was part of the ‘Culture and Cognition group’. This group combined psychological perspectives with those of neighboring disciplines as anthropology and sociology to learn how individual psychological processes are shaped through socio-cultural participation.

== Career ==
Interested by the contrast between the ethnographic findings of marked cultural differences in emotions and psychological research that yielded universality, Mesquita set out to understand the role of culture in emotions. In an extensive literature review that appeared in Psychological Bulletin, she and Nico H. Frijda arrived at a synthesis of the research findings from different disciplines, which challenged the notion of universal basic emotions. They concluded that, while some aspects of emotions may be universal, other aspects are cross-culturally different. In later work, Mesquita found that cultural differences in emotions are systematic and meaningful, and can be understood from cultural differences in self and relationship models (e.g., Mesquita, 2003). The finding of systematic and meaningful cultural differences led Mesquita to formulate a socio-cultural theory of emotions. According to this theory, emotions emerge from interpersonal interactions that are bound and guided by cultural meanings and practices. Her current research focuses on unveiling the interpersonal processes that give rise to cross-culturally different emotions. In another line of research, Mesquita and her colleagues study the consequences of cultural differences in emotions for the multicultural society. They have yielded evidence for emotional acculturation: Emotions change as a result of contact with another culture. The work on acculturation shows the role of culture in producing and reproducing emotions, even beyond their initial socialization. It has also led to a cultural psychological theory of acculturation, in which ‘deep’ psychological processes, such as emotions, change upon contact with another culture. Mesquita’s research interests include the consequences of emotional misfit of immigrant minorities for their belonging to and inclusion in majority culture. The recently published book, Between Us, highlights precisely this theory. It combines a diversity of psychological research and intimate personal stories from different cultures. Notwithstanding, Between Us was nominated for The Next Big Idea. It was also part of the Behavioral Scientist's Summer Book List 2022 and reviewed by Science and The New Yorker.

In 2020, Batja received an Advanced Grant, funded by the European Research Council under the H2020 programme, for the project called EmotionAcculturation. The Advanced Grants support Principal Investigators that have established excellent research achievements. The project is responsible for investigating how emotions, as crucial interaction processes, reflect on immigrant minorities’ social inclusion and wellbeing.

== Other positions and activities ==
- 1993-1994 consultant for UNICEF in Bosnia Herzegovina
- 1997-2002 assistant professor of psychology, Wake Forest University
- 2002-2007 associate professor of psychology, Wake Forest University
- 2015 expert panel on the cultural contexts of health and wellbeing, WHO Regional Office for Europe

== Honors ==
- Society for Personality and Social Psychology Outstanding Contribution to Advances in Cultural Psychology Award, 2022
- Member of the National Committee of Psychological Sciences of the Royal Academies for Science and the Arts of Belgium, 2019
- Fellow at the Center for Advanced Study in the Behavioral Sciences, Stanford University, 2016-2017
- Member of the Royal Flemish Academy of Belgium, 2015
- Fellow of the Society for Experimental Social Psychology (SESP), 2009
- Fellow of the American Psychological Association (APA), 2008
- Fellow of the Society for Personality and Social Psychology (SPSP), 2008
- Fellow of the Association for Psychological Science (APS), 2007
- Robert P. and Debra Lee Fellowship for outstanding faculty, WFU, 2005-2007
- Fellowship from the Royal Dutch Academy of Science, 1994-1997

== Publications ==
- Flanagan, O., LeDoux, Bingle, B., Haybron, D., Mesquita, B., Moody-Adams, M., J., Ren, S., Sun, A.X., Wilson, Y.Y. (in press). The happiness agenda: Why happiness is not the answer. New York: Columbia University Press.
- Mesquita, B. (2022). Between Us: How Cultures Create Emotions. NY: Norton. ISBN 9781324002444
- Uskul, A., Gobel, M., Benet-Martinez, V., & Mesquita, B. (Eds.) (2018) Special Issue on Europe’s culture(s): Negotiating cultural meanings, values, and identities in the European context. Journal of Cross-cultural Psychology, 49(6). https://doi.org/10.1177%2F0022022118779144
- Mesquita, B, & Barrett, L.F. (Eds.) (2017). Emotion. Current Opinion in Psychology, 17, 1-194.
- Hermans, D., Rimé, B., & Mesquita, B. (Eds.) (2013). Changing emotions. London, UK: Psychology Press. https://doi.org/10.4324/9780203075630
- Mesquita, B., Barrett, L. F., & Smith, E. R. (Eds.) (2010). The Mind in Context. New York: Guilford. ISBN 9781606235539
- Kuppens, P., Stouten, J., & Mesquita, B. (Guest Editors) (2009). Special Issue on individual differences in emotion components and dynamics. Cognition and Emotion, 23. https://doi.org/10.1080/02699930902985605
