= Marisa Carrasco =

Mexican psychologist

Marisa Carrasco is a Mexican psychologist, who is a professor of psychology and neural science at New York University. She uses human psychophysics, neuroimaging, and computational modeling to investigate the relation between the psychological and neural mechanisms involved in visual perception and attention.

== Biography ==
Carrasco was born and raised in Mexico City. She received her Licentiate in psychology from the National University of Mexico and her Ph.D. in psychology from Princeton University.

Carrasco was an assistant professor at Wesleyan University (1989–1995) before becoming an associate professor at NYU in 1995. She became a full professor in 2002 and served as the chair of the Psychology Department (2001–2007). She was named a Collegiate Professor in 2008 and has been director of Undergraduate Research at NYU’s College of Arts and Science since 2010.

== Academic work ==
Carrasco has published more than 100 papers in scientific journals, and has written several authoritative reviews regarding the behavioral effects and neuronal bases of visual attention.

She has made contributions in visual perception and attention. These include documenting the central role of physiological factors in visual search, characterizing how attention affects early vision, and developing experiments to investigate the underlying mechanisms. One of her findings shows that attention alters appearance. An old question believed to be outside the realm of scientific study, Carrasco developed an innovative behavioural paradigm that has now become a standard in assessing the effects of attention and awareness, a critical question in psychology, neuroscience and philosophy, Most recently, she has expanded her research to include special populations (autism, ADHD, amblyopia and cortical blindness).

== Honors ==
Carrasco has received an American Association of University Women Fellowship, a National Young Investigator Award from the National Science Foundation, a Cattell Fellowship, and a Guggenheim Fellowship.

Carrasco was the president of the Vision Sciences Society (2011–2012). She has been a senior editor of Vision Research and associate editor of Journal of Vision, She has organized international workshops on attention, and edited the resulting special issues on Visual Attention (in Vision Research: 2004, 2009, 2012).

Carrasco was awarded the honor of Silver Professor of Psychology and Neuroscience at NYU. In 2021, she was inducted into the National Academy of Sciences. In 2022, she received the 10th Andrew Carnegie Prize in Mind Brain Sciences, sponsored by the Carnegie Corporation of New York and administered by CMU's Neuroscience Institute.
