= Krista Thompson =

Krista Thompson may refer to:

- Krista Thompson (field hockey)
- Krista Thompson (art historian)
