= Virginia Valian =

American psychologist

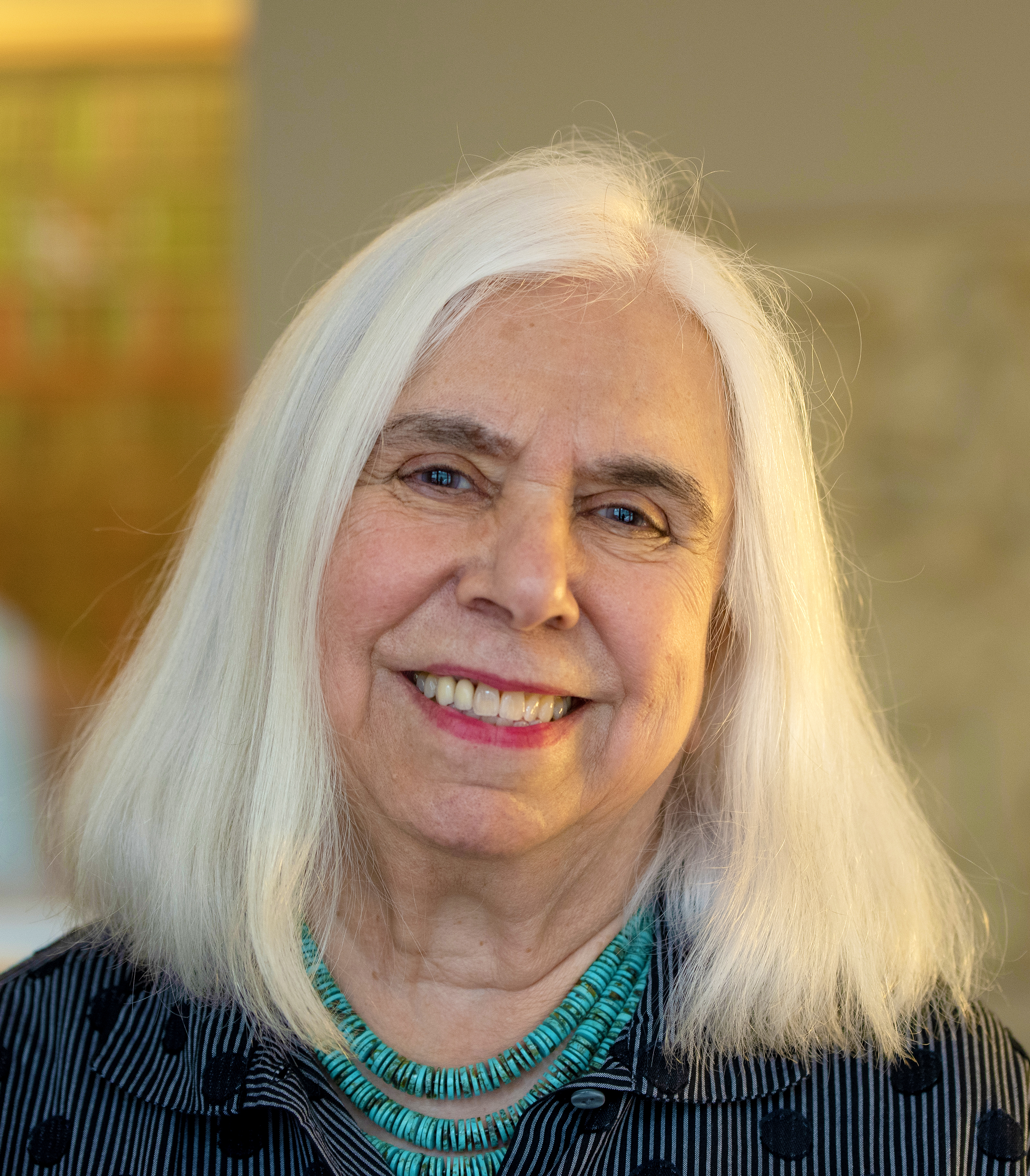
Distinguished Professor Virginia Valian by Alex Irklievski at the CUNY Graduate Center, April 25, 2023.

Virginia Valian is an American psycholinguist, cognitive scientist, and theorist of male-female differences in professional achievement.

Valian is a distinguished professor at Hunter College as well as a member of the doctoral faculties of Psychology, Linguistics, and Speech-Language-Hearing Sciences at the CUNY Graduate Center. She directs the Language Acquisition Research Center (LARC) and the Gender Equity Project (GEP), both at Hunter College. For her work on gender equity, Valian received the 2006 Betty Vetter Award for Research from WEPAN (Women in Engineering ProActive Network). She became an elected member of the American Academy of Arts and Sciences in 2023.

== Research ==
=== Language ===
Valian works on first language acquisition in two-year-olds, with a focus on children's knowledge of the basic grammatical structure of their language, which Valian claims is present at the beginning of combinatorial speech. Valian's primary emphasis is on developing empirical and logical evidence for innate grammatical knowledge. Valian uses a variety of methods – corpus analysis, sentence imitation, pointing tasks, and priming. She has investigated young children's knowledge of abstract syntactic categories and features (such as determiners like 'a' and 'the', adjectives, nouns, prepositions, and the phrases containing those categories, and tense) and young children's understanding that their language does (as in English) or does not (as in Italian and Chinese) require subjects. She argues that apparent deficits in children's knowledge instead reflect limitations in executive function. Valian also works on the relation between bilingualism and higher cognitive function (executive function), where she has proposed that any positive benefits of bilingualism compete with the benefits of other cognitively challenging activities.

=== Gender ===
Valian is the author of Why So Slow? The Advancement of Women (1998, MIT Press), a book that uses concepts and data from psychology, sociology, economics, and biology to explain the disparities in the professional advancement of men and women. According to Valian, men and women alike have implicit hypotheses about gender differences – gender schemas – that create small sex differences in characteristics behaviors, perceptions, and evaluations of men and women. Those small imbalances accumulate to advantage men and disadvantage women. The most important consequence of gender schemas for professional life is that men tend to be overrated and women underrated. In 2014, the Chronicle of Higher Education queried 12 scholars about what nonfiction book published in the last 30 years had most changed their minds. Valian's book was one of the 12 described.

In 2018 Abigail Stewart and Valian co-authored An Inclusive Academy: Achieving Diversity and Excellence, MIT Press. The book argues that diversity and excellence go hand in hand, using comprehensive data from a range of disciplines. The book provides practical advice for overcoming obstacles to inclusion, including better ways of searching for job candidates; evaluating candidates for hiring, tenure, and promotion; helping faculty succeed; and broadening rewards and recognition.
