= Trisha Davis =

American biochemist

Trisha Nell Davis (born May 27, 1954) is an American biochemist and the former Earl Davie/ZymoGenetics Chair of the department of biochemistry at the University of Washington. Her early research focused on Calmodulin, though the primary focus of her lab has since shifted to the molecular machinery of cell division in budding yeast, especially the microtubule organizing centers and the kinetochores. She retired in 2024 after 11 years serving as the Chair.

== Background and education ==
Trisha Davis received her BA in Computer Science and Biology from the University of California, Santa Cruz in 1976. She received her Ph.D. in Molecular Biophysics and Biochemistry from Yale University in 1983. She joined the University of Washington Department of Biochemistry in 1987 and became acting chair of the department in 2011. In 2013, she became the first female chair of the Department.

== Work and discoveries ==
Davis's post-doctoral research focused on Calmodulin in budding yeast After starting her own lab at the University of Washington, she discovered that Calmodulin performs an essential function in the yeast spindle pole body, beginning the lab's gradual transition into the study of mitosis.

The Davis Lab has published extensively on the spindle pole body and on the kinetochore. Much of the recent research, conducted in collaboration with the Asbury Lab at the University of Washington, uses biophysical techniques such as optical tweezers to quantify the microtubule-coupling activity of the kinetochore.

Dr. Davis was also the director of the Yeast Resource Center (YRC), a Biomedical Technology Research Center supported by the National Institutes of Health and National Institute of General Medical Studies.

== Awards and recognition ==
In 2020, Davis was named to the American Academy of Arts and Sciences.
