= Catherine Boone =

Professor of Comparative Politics

Catherine Boone FAAAS FBA
- Citizenship: American

Academic background
- Education: University of California, San Diego (BSc); Massachusetts Institute of Technology (PhD)

Catherine Boone is Professor of Comparative Politics at the London School of Economics and Political Science. Boone is a specialist in property rights, political economy, and territorial politics in Africa.

== Education ==
Boone earned her B.A. at the University of California, San Diego and graduated with honors in Political Science and minors in Economics and French Literature. She received her Ph.D. from the Massachusetts Institute of Technology in the Department of Political Science. She concentrated in comparative politics, political economy, and African politics. During her time at the University of California she studied as an exchange student and President's Research Fellow at the University of Nairobi in Kenya. She focused on agricultural and international economics.

== Career ==
She has been a visiting researcher at the Centre Des Etudes Supérieures en Gestion, Dakar, Senegal and a visiting professor and researcher in the Centro de Investigacion y Docencias Economicas (CIDE) in a Division of International Studies, Mexico City. In 2002 and 2003, she was a visiting Fulbright professor in Beijing Foreign Studies University, People’s Republic of China. She was an Assistant, Associate, and then Professor of Government in University of Texas at Austin. In September 2013 she accepted a position as Professor of Comparative Politics in the Departments of Government and International Development in London School of Economics and Political Science.

She was elected fellow of the American Academy of Arts and Sciences in 2020 and made a fellow of the British Academy in 2021.

== Selected publications ==
- Property and Political Order in Africa: Land Rights and the Structure of Politics. Cambridge University Press, 2014. This book won APSA's 2016 Luebbert Book Award for best book in Comparative Politics.
- Property and Political Order: Land Rights and the Structure of Conflict in Africa. Cambridge University Press, 2013.
- Political Topographies of the African State: Territorial Authority and Institutional Choice. Cambridge University Press, 2003.
- Merchant Capital and the Roots of State Power in Senegal. Cambridge University Press, 1993.
