= Anthony Di Fiore =

Primatologist

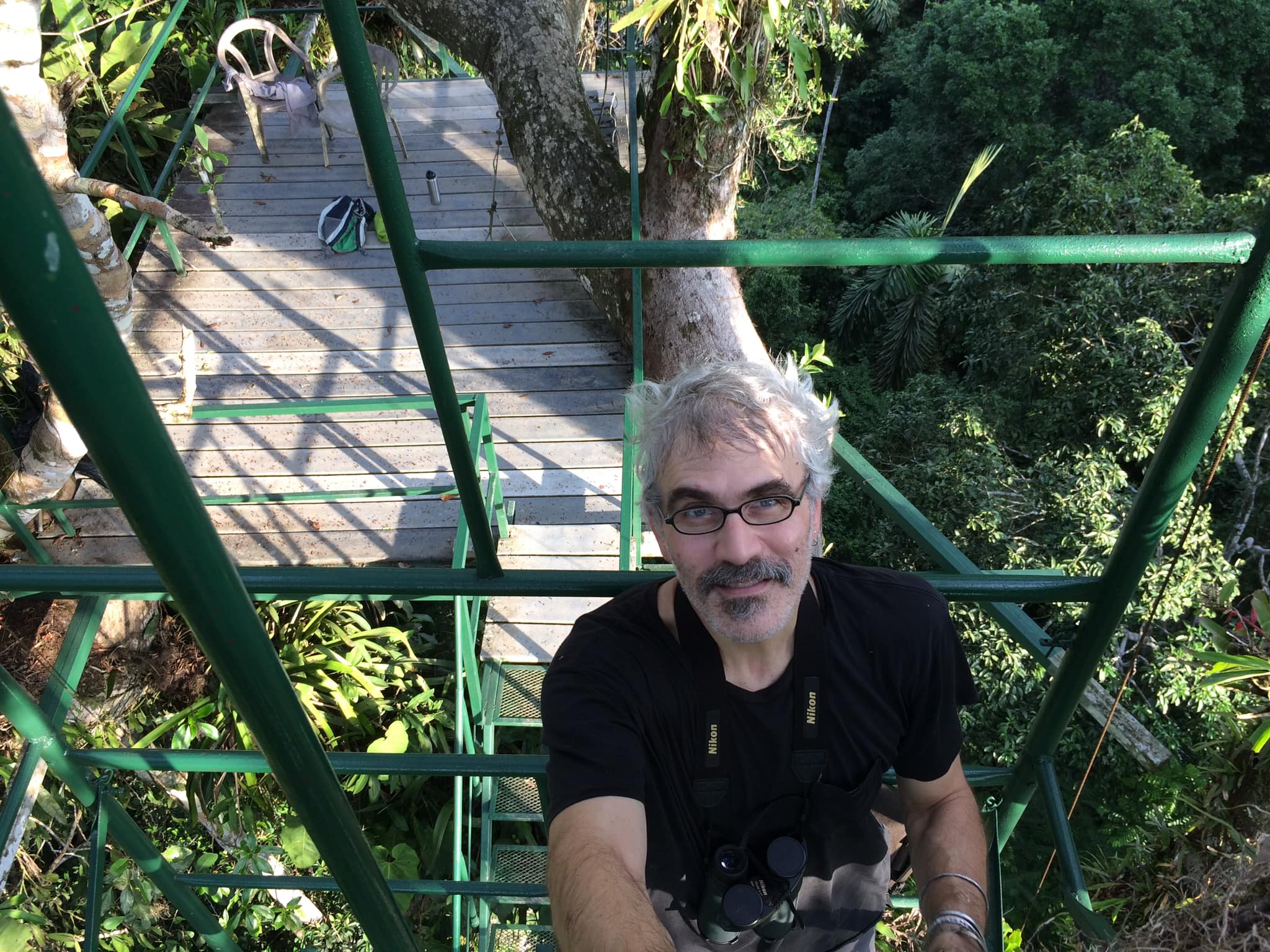
Di Fiore at Tiputini Biodiversity Station

Anthony F. Di Fiore is an primatologist who has been conducting field research in the Ecuadorian Amazon since 1991. The main subject of his research is the behavior and ecology of Atelines (woolly, spider and howler monkeys) and the evolution of pair-bonding and monogamy (titi and saki monkeys). He is a Centennial Commission Professor in the Department of Anthropology at The University of Texas at Austin. He also conducts genetic research, often collecting samples through noninvasive means.

== Education ==
Di Fiore graduated from Cornell University in 1990 with a B.S. in Biological Sciences (Ecology, Evolution, and Systematics). His graduate studies took place at the University of California at Davis under Dr. Peter Rodman. He completed his doctorate in 1997.

== Career and research ==
After completing postdoctoral research in the Molecular Genetics Laboratory at National Zoological Park – Smithsonian Institution and University of Maryland in College Park, Di Fiore moved to New York University where he was a member of the Anthropology Department's faculty for 11 years. After moving to the University of Texas at Austin in 2011, he became Chair of the Anthropology Department from 2014 to 2021.

Since 1993, Di Fiore has been conducting field research in Yasuni National Park in Ecuador, first at the Proyecto Primates Research Area and currently at the Tiputini Biodiversity Station. Both sites are in primary rainforest and include a diverse primate community of 10 to 12 different species. Interested in behavior and ecology, much of Di Fiore's research has focused on the Atelines (especially Lagothrix lagotricha and Ateles belzebuth), a clade of primates that shares features with African great apes in that females migrate from the groups they are born into and males are closely related. Genetic research augments field work, providing greater detail about population structure. Camera traps are also used for data collection, especially near salt licks.

Di Fiore collaborates with numerous projects and researchers throughout the Americas.

== Awards and honors ==
- 2022 Elected to the American Academy of Arts & Sciences
- 2021 Elected to The Academy of Medicine, Engineering, and Science of Texas
- 2021 Elected to membership in the National Academy of Sciences
- 2018 Invited plenary speaker for the 87th Annual Meeting of the American Association of Biological Anthropologists, April 2018, Austin, TX (In the house of the piranha: Twenty-five years of field research in the Ecuadorian rainforest).
- 2016 Elected as a Fellow of the American Association for the Advancement of Science
- 2003-2004 Fulbright Scholar, Ecuador, Committee for International Exchange of Scholars

== Outreach ==
- 2014 Primate Social Behavior Hot Science, Cool Talks, Environmental Science Institute, The University of Texas at Austin
- 2014 Primate Social Behavior (with Dr. Rebecca Lewis) Views and Brews, KUT Radio podcast
- 2011 Preparing to leave the Amazon, and telling tales of parasites past (last blog post of 7), Scientist at Work Blog for The New York Times
