= John T. Lis =

American geneticist

John Thomas Lis (born in Willimantic, Connecticut) is the Barbara McClintock Professor of Molecular Biology & Genetics at the Cornell University College of Agriculture and Life Sciences. Dr. Lis was a recipient of a Guggenheim Fellowship in 2000 for his research on protein templating in the propagation of gene activity.

- Harvey Lecture, 2018

== Research ==
Dr. Lis has been a faculty member at Cornell University since 1978 obtaining full professorship in 1991. His research program has been supported by the National Institutes of Health, including a MERIT Award, March of Dimes, American Cancer Society, Cornell Biotechnology Institute, and a Procter & Gamble University Exploratory Research Grant.

Dr. Lis is the director of the Lis Lab which investigates molecular mechanisms of gene regulation in eukaryotes using as a primary model the robustly and rapidly activated heat shock genes.

== Education ==
Dr. Lis received his B.S. in Chemistry from Fairfield University 1970 and his Ph.D. in Biochemistry from Brandeis University in 1975. He completed his postdoctoral work at Stanford University from 1975 to 1978 focusing on Drosophila gene regulation and chromosome structure, during which he was supported by a fellowship from the Helen Hay Whitney Foundation.
