= Zoltan Fodor (physicist) =

Hungarian-German physicist (born 1964)

- Born: Budapest, Hungary
- Education: Eotvos Lorand University, Budapest, Hungary
- Known for: Numerical Quantum Field Theory, Lattice QCD
- Scientific career
- Fields: Theoretical Particle Physics

Zoltan Fodor is a Hungarian-German theoretical particle physicist, best known for his works in lattice quantum chromodynamics.

== Life ==
Fodor was born in 1964 in Budapest, Hungary. At high school and at university he won several national competitions in mathematics, physics and chemistry. He did his undergraduate studies at the Eotvos Lorand University in Budapest, where he received his PhD in 1990. He was postdoctoral fellow at DESY in Hamburg, CERN in Geneva and KEK in Tsukuba.

In 1998 he became a professor at the Lorand Eotvos University, Budapest, Hungary. In 2003 he moved to the University of Wuppertal in Germany. In 2020 he moved to Pennsylvania State University in the United States.

== Career ==
Fodor is widely known for his results in lattice QCD. Many of his findings represent the first fully controlled lattice calculations using ab-initio quantum chromodynamics and quantum electrodynamics.

== QCD thermodynamics ==
In 2000 he proposed a method. to circumvent the sign problem at finite baryonic chemical potentials or densities. The numerical sign problem is one of the major unsolved problems in the physics of many particle systems. In 2006 he determined the nature of the QCD transition in the early universe. Since the transition turned out to be an analytic one no observable cosmic relics are expected from this transition. In a series of papers he also calculated the absolute scale of the QCD transition. The equation of state of the strongly interacting matter plays a crucial role both in cosmology and in heavy ion collisions, which he determined in 2010. By calculating the topological susceptibility in the early universe at high temperatures, he gave a prediction for the axion's mass in 2016. Axions are one of the mostly advocated candidates for dark matter.

== QCD at vanishing temperature ==
Since 2005 he has been the spokesperson of the Budapest-Marseille-Wuppertal Collaboration focusing on QCD phenomena at vanishing temperature. In 2008 they determined the light hadron spectrum, which explains the mass of the visible universe In 2015 the mass difference between the neutron and the proton (and other so-called isospin splittings) were calculated. This 0.14 percent neutron-proton mass difference is responsible—among others—for the existence of atoms, as we know them, or for the ignition of stars. In 2021 and 2026 they determined the anomalous magnetic dipole moment of the muon. Before their work this quantity was widely believed to indicate new physics beyond the Standard Model. However, the Budapest-Marseille-Wuppertal Collaboration obtained theory-based results, agreeing with the experimental value and not with the previous theory-based value that relied on the electron-positron annihilation experiments. Their result provided a widely accepted solution for this long-standing problem.

== Awards and Recognitions ==
- 1998 – Prize of the Hungarian Academy of Sciences
- 2000 – Computerworld Award
- 2008 – Top 10 Breakthroughs of the Year (for determining the Hadron Spectrum)
- 2010 – Honorary Member of the Hungarian Academy of Sciences
- 2011 – European Physical Society, Fellow
- 2021 – Top 10 Breakthroughs of the Year (magnetic moment of the muon)
- 2022 – European Research Council Advanced Grant
- 2022 – Fellow of the American Physical Society
- 2023 – Elected to the American Academy of Arts and Sciences
- 2024 – Frontiers of Science Award
