= Directed assembly of micro- and nano-structures =

Assembly method for minute structures

Directed assembly of micro- and nano-structures are methods of mass-producing micro to nano devices and materials. Directed assembly allows the accurate control of assembly of micro and nano particles to form even the most intricate and highly functional devices or materials.

== Directed self-assembly ==
Directed self-assembly (DSA) is a type of directed assembly which utilizes block co-polymer morphology to create lines, space and hole patterns, facilitating for a more accurate control of the feature shapes. Then it uses surface interactions as well as polymer thermodynamics to finalize the formation of the final pattern shapes. To control the surface interactions enabling sub-10 nm resolution, a team consisting of Massachusetts Institute of Technology, University of Chicago, and Argonne National Laboratory developed a way to use vapor-phase deposited polymeric top layer on the block co-polymer film in 2017.

The DSA is not a standalone process, but rather is integrated with traditional manufacturing processes in order to mass-produce micro and nano structures at a lower cost. Directed self-assembly is mostly used in the semiconductor and hard drive industries. The semiconductor industry uses this assembly method in order to be able increase the resolution (trying to fit in more gates), while the hard drive industry uses DSA to manufacture "bit patterned media" according to the specified storage densities.

== Micro-structures ==
There are many applications of directed assembly in the micro-scale, from tissue engineering to polymer thin-films. In tissue engineering, directed assembly have been able to replace scaffolding approach of building tissues. This happens by controlling the position and organization of different cells, which are the "building blocks" of the tissue, into different desired micro-structures. This eliminates the error of not being able to reproduce the same tissue, which is a major issue in the scaffolding approach.

== Nanostructures ==
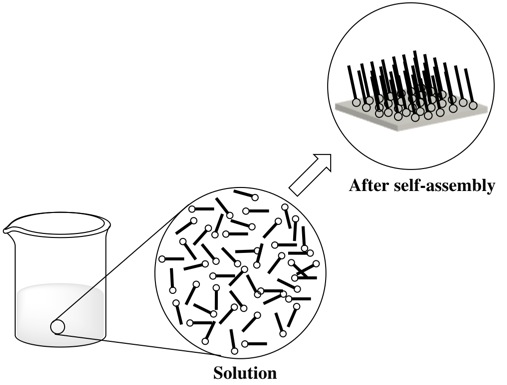
A directed assembly of nano particles. Here the particles form an organized structure from an initial disorganized state.

Nanotechnology provides methods to organizing materials such as molecules, polymers, building blocks, etc. to form precise nanostructures which have many applications. In the process and application of peptide self-assembly into nano tubes, the single-wall carbon nano tubes is an example which consists of a graphene sheet seamlessly wrapped to a cylinder. This produced in the outside flow of a carbon and yield by laser vaporization of graphite enriched by a transition metal.

Nanoimprint lithography is a popular method to fabricate nanometer scale pattern. The patterns are made by mechanical deformation of imprint resist (monomer or polymer formulation) and subsequent processes. Then, it is cured by heat or ultraviolet light, and tight level of the resist and template is controlled at appropriate conditions depend on our purposes. In addition, nanoimprint lithography has high resolution and throughput with low cost. Disadvantages include increased time for templating procedures, a lack of standard procedures results in multiple fabrication methods, and the patterns that are able to be formed are limited.

With the goal of mitigating these disadvantages while applying nanotechnology to electronics, researchers at the National Science Foundation's Nanoscale Science and Engineering Center for High-Rate Nanomanufacturing (CHN) at Northeastern University with partners UMass Lowell and University of New Hampshire have developed a directed assembly process of single-walled carbon nano tube (SWNT) networks to create a circuit template that can be transfer from one substrate to another.

== Self-assembled monolayers on solid substrates ==
Self-assembled monolayers (SAMs) are made of a layer of organic molecules which forms naturally as an ordered lattice on the surface of a desired substrate. Their molecules in the lattice have connections chemically at one end (head group), while the other end (end group) creates the exposed surface of the SAM.

Many types of SAMs can be formed. For example: thiols form SAMs on gold, silver, copper, or on some compound semiconductors such as InP and GaAs. By changing the tail group of the molecules, different surface properties can be obtained; therefore SAMs can be used to render surfaces hydrophobic or hydrophilic as well as change surface states of semiconductor. With self-assembly, positioning of SAMs is used to define chemical system precisely to find the target location in a molecular-inorganic device. With this characteristic, SAMs is a good candidates for molecular electronic devices such as use SAMs to build electronic devices and maybe the circuits is an intriguing prospect. Because of their ability to provide the basis for very high-density data storage and high-speed devices.

=== Acoustic methods ===
Directed assembly using the acoustic methods manipulate waves in order to allow non-invasive assembling of micro and nano structures. Due to this, acoustics are especially widely used in the biomedical industry to manipulate droplets, cells and other molecules.

Acoustic waves are generated by a piezoelectric transducer controlled from the pulse generator. These waves are able to then manipulate droplets of liquid and move them together, in order to form a packed assembly. Moreover, the frequency and amplitude of the waves can be modified in order to achieve a more accurate control of the particular behavior of the droplet or cell.

=== Optical methods ===
Directed assembly or more specifically directed self-assembly, can produce a high pattern resolution (~10 nm) with high efficiency and compatibility. However, when using DSA in high volume manufacturing, one must have a way to quantify the degree of order of line/space patterns formed by DSA in order to reduce defect.

Normal approaches, such as critical dimension-scanning electron microscopy (CD-SEM), to obtain data for pattern quality inspection take too much time and is also labor-intensive. On the other hand, the optical scatterometer-based metrology is a non-invasive technique and has very high throughput due to its larger spot size. These result in the collection of more statistical data than by using SEM, and that data processing is also automated with the optical technique making it more feasible than traditional CD-SEM.

=== Magnetic methods ===
Magnetic field directed self-assembly (MFDSA) allows the manipulation of dispersion and subsequent assembly of magnetic nanoparticles. This is widely used in the development of advanced materials whereby inorganic nanoparticles (NPs) are dispersed in polymers in order to enhance the properties of the materials.

The magnetic field technique allows the assembling of particles in 3D by doing the assembly in a dilute suspension where the solvent does not evaporate. It also does not need to use a template, and the approach also improve the magnetic anisotropy along the chain direction.

=== Dielectrophoretic methods ===
Dielectrophoretic directed self-assembly utilizes an electric field that controls metal particles, such as gold nanorods, by inducing a dipole in the particles. By varying the polarity and strength of the electric field, the polarized particles are either attracted to positive regions or repelled from negative regions where the electric field has higher strength. This direct manipulation method transports the particles to position and orient them into a nano-structure on a receptor substrate.
