= Ruma Banerjee =

Professor at University of Michigan Medical School

- Banerjee in 2022
- Born: Kolkata, India
- Scientific career
- Workplaces: University of Nebraska-Lincoln, University of Michigan, Renssalaer Poytechnic University
- Doctoral advisor: Jim Coward
- Website: https://medicine.umich.edu/dept/biochem/ruma-banerjee-phd

Ruma Banerjee is a professor of enzymology and biological chemistry at the University of Michigan Medical School. She is an experimentalist whose research has focused on unusual cofactors in enzymology.

== Research ==
Banerjee's work focuses on the enzymes, coenzymes and metabolic pathways that support and interact with the sulfur network in mammals. The enzymes that she studies are involved in the biogenesis and oxidation of hydrogen sulfide (H2S), and in the assimilation, trafficking and utilization of the essential vitamin B12 cofactor. The coenzymes that she studies include vitamins B2 (flavin), B6 (pyridoxal phosphate), B12 (cobalamin), and heme, which support key junction enzymes that commit the flow of sulfur to metabolic tributaries and are major hubs of regulation. Her research is focused on understanding how H2S signals by targeting energy metabolism, with consequent impact on redox, central carbon, nucleotide and lipid metabolism. Her research been instrumental in elucidating the structural enzymology of the complex B12 trafficking pathway chaperones found in humans, illuminating how redox-linked coordination chemistry controls the reactivity and translocation of this large organometallic cofactor between proteins, and how mutations described in homocystinuria and methylmalonic aciduria patients, dysregulate this pathway.

== Editorial ==
Since 2012, Professor Banerjee has been an Associate Editor for Chemical Reviews and the Journal of Biological Chemistry. She has authored two textbooks on the chemistry and biological effects of Vitamin B12 and on reduction / oxidation cascades in biological systems.

== Awards ==
- 2026 - Elected Member, National Academy of Sciences
- 2023 - Elected Fellow, American Academy of Arts and Sciences
- 2021 - Fellow of the American Society for Biochemistry and Molecular Biology (ASBMB)
- 2019 - Merck Award (ASBMB)
- 2011 - Fellow of the American Association for the Advancement of Science (AAAS)
- 2001 - Pfizer Award in Enzyme Chemistry (American Chemical Society)
- 2000 - Established Investigator (American Heart Association)
