= Fumihiko Sueki =

Japanese historian (born 1949)

- Born: September 6, 1949; Japan Yamanashi
- Other name: 末木 文美士
- Occupation: historian of Japanese Buddhism

Fumihiko Sueki (末木 文美士, Sueki Fumihiko; 1949– ) is a Japanese academic and historian, and one of Japan's leading scholars of Japanese Buddhism. He is a professor at the International Research Center for Japanese Studies (国際日本文化研究センター, Nichibunken) in Kyoto. A member of the advisory board of Nanzan Institute for Religion and Culture's Japanese Journal of Religious Studies, he is also a contributor to the journal itself.

== Early life ==
Sueki's studies at the University of Tokyo were rewarded with a BA in 1973 and an MA in 1975. In 1994, he earned his Ph.D.; and he joined the faculty in the next year.

== Career ==
From 1995 through 2009, Sueki was a professor at the University of Tokyo. In the Graduate School of Humanities and Sociology, he taught courses about Japanese Buddhism. His primary area of interest is the reconstruction of the intellectual history of Buddhism in Japan from ancient to modern times.

Since 2009, he has been a professor at the International Research Centre for Japanese Studies.

== Selected works ==
In a statistical overview derived from writings by and about Fumihiko Sueki, OCLC/WorldCat encompasses roughly 60+ works in 80+ publications in 3 languages and 500+ library holdings.

- 日本仏教史 : 思想史としてのアプローチ (1992)
- 観無量寿経 (1992)
- 日本仏教思想史論考 (1993)
- 禅と思想 (1997)
- 鎌倉仏教形成論: 思想史の立場から (1998)
- 近代日本の思想再考 (2004)
- 明治思想家論 (2004)
- 近代日本と仏教 (2004)
- 日本宗教史 (2006)
- The Sutra on the Concentration of Sitting Meditation (2009)
- 日本の思想をよむ (2020) English translation Exploring Japanese Thought (2025)
