= Richard T. Neer =

American art historian

Richard Theodore Neer is Barbara E. and Richard J. Franke Distinguished Service Professor of Art History, Cinema & Media Studies and the College at the University of Chicago. From 2010 to 2018 he was the Executive Editor of Critical Inquiry, where he continues to serve as a Co-Editor. Since 2019, he has been Director of the Franke Institute for the Humanities at the University of Chicago. He received his A.B. from Harvard College in 1991, his Ph.D. from the University of California at Berkeley in 1998. He has received fellowships from the J. Paul Getty Museum, the Center for Advanced Study in the Visual Arts in Washington, D.C., and the American Academy in Rome. In 2022 he was elected to the American Academy of Arts and Sciences.

== Selected publications ==
- Corpus Vasorum Antiquorum. Malibu, J. Paul Getty Museum, Fascicle 7. Malibu: The J. Paul Getty Museum, 1997. ISBN 0892362944
- Style and politics in Athenian vase-painting: The craft of democracy, ca. 530-460 B.C.E. Cambridge: Cambridge University Press, 2002. ISBN 0521791111
- The Emergence of the Classical Style in Greek Sculpture. Chicago: University of Chicago Press, 2010. ISBN 0226570630
- Art & Archaeology of the Greek World: A New History, c. 2500 - c. 150 BCE, Second Edition. London: Thames & Hudson, 2018. ISBN 0500052093
- Pindar, Song, and Space: Towards a Lyric Archaeology. Co-authored with Leslie Kurke. Baltimore, MD: Johns Hopkins University Press, 2019.ISBN 1421429780
- Painting as a Way of Life: Philosophy and Practice in French Art, 1620–1660. Chicago: University of Chicago Press, 2025. ISBN 9780226835501
