= E. V. Murphree Award in Industrial and Engineering Chemistry =

The E. V. Murphree Award is an annual award presented by the American Chemical Society for outstanding research of a theoretical or experimental nature in the fields of industrial chemistry or chemical engineering. The award comes with a $5000 prize, a certificate, and up to $1000 in travel expenses paid.

The award is named after Eger V. Murphree, the American chemist best known for his co-invention of the process of fluid catalytic cracking.

== Recipients ==
Source: American Chemical Society

- 2024 Rakesh Agrawal
- 2023 Qinghuang Lin
- 2022 Joseph M. DeSimone
- 2021 Yong Wang
- 2020 Enrique Iglesia
- 2019 Hariklia Deligianni
- 2018 Linda Broadbelt
- 2017 Eleftherios Terry Papoutsakis
- 2016 Michael M. Thackeray
- 2015 Joseph R. Zoeller
- 2014 Joan F. Brennecke
- 2013 Esther S. Takeuchi
- 2012 Michael F. Doherty
- 2011 Norman N. Li
- 2010 Gregory Stephanopoulos
- 2009 Milorad (Mike) P. Dudukovic
- 2008 Georges Belfort
- 2007 Wolfgang F. Holderich
- 2006 Liang-Shih Fan
- 2005 Mark E. Davis
- 2004 James E. Lyons
- 2003 Leo E. Manzer
- 2002 George R. Lester
- 2001 John N. Armor
- 2000 J. Larry Duda
- 1999 Donald R. Paul
- 1998 Stanley I. Sandler
- 1997 Arthur W. Westerberg
- 1996 Eli Ruckenstein
- 1995 Charles A. Eckert
- 1994 Edwin N. Lightfoot
- 1993 James J. Carberry
- 1992 Clarence D. Chang
- 1991 Richard Alkire
- 1990 L. E. Scriven
- 1989 Warren E. Stewart
- 1988 Jule A. Rabo
- 1987 Wolfgang M. H. Sachtler
- 1986 John H. Sinfelt
- 1985 Michel Boudart
- 1984 Robert K. Grasselli
- 1983 Herman Pines
- 1982 Sol W. Weller
- 1981 G. Alex Mills
- 1980 Milton Orchin
- 1979 John M. Prausnitz
- 1978 Donald F. Othmer
- 1977 Alexis Voorhies, Jr.
- 1976 James F. Roth
- 1975 Donald L. Katz
- 1974 Herman S. Bloch
- 1973 Thomas K. Sherwood
- 1972 Paul B. Weisz
- 1971 Heinz Heinemann
- 1970 Peter V. Danckwerts
- 1969 Alex G. Oblad
- 1968 Melvin A. Cook
- 1967 Alfred Clark
- 1966 Richard H. Wilhelm
- 1965 Vladimir Haensel
- 1964 Bruce H. Sage
- 1963 Manson Benedict
- 1962 Eugene J. Houdry
- 1961 Olaf A. Hougen
- 1960 Neal R. Amundson
- 1959 Edwin R. Gilliland
- 1958 duBois Eastman
- 1957 Warren K. Lewis

== See also ==
- List of chemistry awards
