= Gábor A. Somorjai =

American chemist (1935–2025)

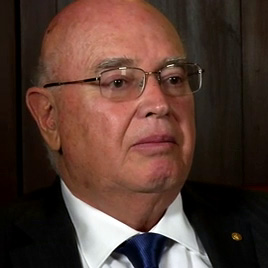
- Somorjai, c. 2001
- Born: May 4, 1935; Budapest, Hungary
- Died: July 7, 2025 (aged 90)
- Education: Budapest University of Technology and Economics
- Notable work: University of California, Berkeley
- Awards: Wolf Prize in Chemistry (1998); National Medal of Science (2001); Irving Langmuir Award (2007); William H. Nichols Medal (2015); Enrico Fermi Award (2023)

Gabor Árpád Somorjai (May 4, 1935 – July 7, 2025) was a Hungarian-born American professor of chemistry at the University of California, Berkeley, and was a leading researcher in the field of surface chemistry and catalysis, especially the catalytic effects of metal surfaces on gas-phase reactions ("heterogeneous catalysis"). For his contributions to the field, Somorjai won the Wolf Prize in Chemistry in 1998, the Linus Pauling Award in 2000, the National Medal of Science in 2002, the Priestley Medal in 2008, the 2010 BBVA Foundation Frontiers of Knowledge Award in Basic Science and the NAS Award in Chemical Sciences in 2013. In April 2015, Somorjai was awarded the American Chemical Society's William H. Nichols Medal.

== Early life ==
Somorjai was born in Budapest in 1935 to Jewish parents. He was saved from the Nazis when his mother sought the assistance of Raoul Wallenberg in 1944 who issued Swedish passports to Somorjai's mother, himself and his sister saving them from the Nazi death camps. While Somorjai's father ended up in the camp system, he was fortunate to survive but many of Somorjai's extended family were killed in the concentration camps.

He was studying chemical engineering at the Budapest University of Technology and Economics in 1956. As a participant in the 1956 Hungarian Revolution, Somorjai left Hungary to go to the US after the Soviet invasion. Along with other Hungarian immigrants, Somorjai enrolled in graduate study at Berkeley and obtained his doctorate in 1960. He joined IBM's Thomas J. Watson Research Center staff in Yorktown Heights, New York for a few years but returned to Berkeley as an assistant professor in 1964.

== Chemical research ==
Somorjai discusses his research and contributions.

The introduction of new technology such as low-energy electron diffraction revolutionised the study of surfaces in the 1950s and 1960s. However, early studies were limited to surfaces such as silicon, important for its electrical properties. In contrast, Somorjai was interested in surfaces such as platinum known for its chemical properties.

Somorjai discovered that the defects on surfaces are where catalytic reactions take place. When these defects break, new bonds are formed between atoms leading to complex organic compounds such as naphtha to be converted into gasoline as an example. These findings led to greater understanding of subjects such as adhesion, lubrication, friction and adsorption. His research also has important implications such as nanotechnology.

In the 1990s, Somorjai started working with physicist Y. R. Shen on developing a technique known as Sum Frequency Generation Spectroscopy to study surface reactions without the need for a vacuum chamber. He is also studying surface reactions in nanotechnology at the atomic and molecular level using atomic force microscopy and scanning tunnelling microscopy, both of which can be used without vacuum.

Somorjai's expertise in surfaces was used as a consultant to the 2002 Winter Olympics where he gave advice on how to make ice-skating surfaces as fast as possible. Somorjai's research had shed new light on ice, demonstrating that skaters skated on a top layer of rapidly vibrating molecules, rather than on a layer of liquid water on top of the ice acting as a lubricant, which had previously been the generally accepted explanation for the slipperiness of ice.

During his career, Somorjai published more than one thousand papers and three textbooks on surface chemistry and heterogeneous catalysis. He was the most-often cited person in the fields of surface chemistry and catalysis.

== Death ==
Somorjai died on July 7, 2025, at age 90.

== Honors and awards ==
Somorjai was elected to the National Academy of Sciences in 1979 and the American Academy of Arts and Sciences in 1983. He was awarded the Wolf Foundation Prize in Chemistry in 1998 for his contribution to chemistry, sharing the honor with Professor Gerhard Ertl of the Fritz-Haber Institute in Berlin. Somorjai was awarded the National Medal of Science for his contribution as a chemist in 2002. The American Chemical Society also awarded him the Peter Debye Award in Physical Chemistry and the Adamson Award in Surface Chemistry. In 2002, he was awarded the status of University Professor across the University of California network, an honor he shares with two dozen other academics. In 2004, he won the F.A. Cotton Medal for Excellence in Chemical Research of the American Chemical Society. In 2008, he received the Priestley Medal, the highest award of the American Chemical Society, for his "extraordinarily creative and original contributions to surface science and catalysis". In 2009, he was named a Miller Senior Fellow of the Miller Institute at the University of California Berkeley. He was awarded the prestigious 2010 BBVA Foundation Frontiers of Knowledge Award in Basic Science. In addition, he was also awarded in 2010 the ENI New Frontiers of Hydrocarbons Prize and the Honda Prize. The recipient of the 2007 Nobel Prize in Chemistry, Gerhard Ertl, and other members of the surface science community, were surprised and mystified by the Nobel Prize committee's decision to pass over Somorjai, awarding the prize for surface-chemistry to Ertl alone. In 2009, Somorjai was recipient of the Reed M. Izatt and James J. Christensen Lectureship. In 2013, Somorjai was awarded the National Academy of Sciences NAS Award in Chemical Sciences. In April 2015, Somorjai was awarded the American Chemical Society's William H. Nichols Medal. Most recently, in 2023, Somorjai was recipient of the Enrico Fermi Award along with Darleane C. Hoffman.

== The Somorjai Award ==
The Gabor A. Somorjai Award for Creative Research in Catalysis, consisting of US$5,000 and a certificate, is given annually to recognize outstanding research in the field of catalysis. The award is sponsored by the Gabor A. and Judith K. Somorjai Endowment Fund.

Previous recipients have been:

- 1999 – Sir John Meurig Thomas
- 2000 – Gabor A. Somorjai
- 2001 – Alexis T. Bell
- 2002 – Jack H. Lunsford
- 2003 – Robert H. Grubbs
- 2004 – Bruce C. Gates
- 2005 – D. Wayne Goodman
- 2006 – James A. Dumesic
- 2007 – Hans-Joachim Freund
- 2008 – Avelino Corma Canos
- 2009 – Jens K. Nørskov
- 2010 – Robert J. Madix
- 2011 – Harold H. Kung
- 2012 – Enrique Iglesia
- 2013 – Tobin J. Marks
- 2014 – Mark E. Davis
- 2015 – Maurice Brookhart
- 2016 – Donna G. Blackmond
- 2017 – John E. Bercaw
- 2018 – David W. C. MacMillan
- 2019 – Manos Mavrikakis
- 2020 – David Milstein
- 2021 – Paul J. Chirik
- 2022 – Jin-Quan Yu
- 2023 – Suljo Linic
- 2024 – Charles T. Campbell
- 2025 – Gregory C. Fu
- 2026 – Scott Miller
- 2027 – Krzysztof Matyjaszewski

== The Gabor A. and Judith K. Somorjai Visiting Miller Professorship Award ==
Established in 2011, the Gabor A. and Judith K. Somorjai Visiting Miller Professorship Award is one of the programs of the Miller Institute for Basic Research in Science at the University of California Berkeley. The Somorjais' wishes in the establishment of this award is to support visiting scientists in the broad field of chemical sciences for a one-month term in the Miller Institute. The first award was granted in 2013 to Angelos Michaelides.

Recipients include :

- 2013 – Fall: Angelos Michaelides
- 2015 – Fall: Christophe Coperet
- 2016 – Spring: Sarah Keller
- 2017 – Spring: Chuan He
- 2017 – Fall: Edward Sargent
- 2017 – Fall: Shana Kelley
- 2018 – Fall: Bernd Abel
- 2019 – Fall: Jennifer Schomaker
- 2021 – Spring: Roland Wester
- 2021–2022: Yi Cui
- 2023 – Fall: Alec Wodtke
- 2024 – Fall: Marina Filip
- 2026 – Spring: Liviu Mirica

== See also ==
- List of chemistry awards

== General references ==
- Berkeley Campus News article on Somorjai
- Berkeley Lab article on the National Medal of Science
- Article on Somorjai's contribution to the science of ice skating
- Raoul Wallenberg Centre media release on the Wolf Chemistry Prize
- Somorjai Research Group website
