= Ted Sargent =

Canadian scientist

- Born: Edward Hartley Sargent
- Education: University of Toronto Ph.D. (1998); Queen's University at Kingston B.Sc.Eng. (1995)
- Spouse: Shana O. Kelley
- Awards: Killam Prize for Engineering (2020) NSERC Brockhouse Award (2016) Steacie Prize (2012)
- Scientific career
- Workplaces: University of Toronto, Northwestern University
- Thesis: The lateral current injection laser: Theory, design, fabrication (1998)
- Doctoral advisor: Jingming Xu
- Doctoral students: Leyla Soleymani
- Website: light.utoronto.ca

Edward Hartley Sargent FRSC is a Canadian scientist at Northwestern University. Previously, he served as University Professor of Electrical & Computer Engineering and vice-president of Research and Innovation, and Strategic Initiatives at the University of Toronto. He also is the Canada Research Chair in Nanotechnology. He is in the Departments of Chemistry and of Electrical and Computer Engineering at Northwestern University, and is affiliated with the International Institute for Nanotechnology at Northwestern.

Sargent has made contributions in the use of colloidal quantum dots and perovskite materials for optoelectronic devices, including photovoltaic cells, photodetectors, and light emitting materials. Sargent has also published in the area of electrochemical reduction of carbon dioxide.

Sargent has been honored with multiple awards for his research, including a Killam Prize for Engineering in 2020, the NSERC Brockhouse Award in Interdisciplinary Research and Engineering with Shana Kelley in 2016, and the Steacie Prize in 2012. He is a fellow of the Canadian Academy of Engineering, Institute of Electrical and Electronics Engineers and the American Association for the Advancement of Science.

== Education ==
Sargent spent several summers in the early 1990s working on quantum well lasers at Nortel. He studied Engineering Physics at Queen's University at Kingston, earning his B.Sc.Eng. in 1995. Sargent then conducted graduate studies in Electrical and Computer Engineering, in the area of Photonics, at the University of Toronto, with Prof. Jingming Xu. He graduated with his Ph.D. in 1998.

== Career ==
Sargent began his independent research career at the University of Toronto as an assistant professor in the Department of Electrical and Computer Engineering in 1998. He was promoted to associate professor in 2002, and full Professor in 2005. In 2015, Sargent was appointed as University Professor, the University of Toronto's most distinguished rank.

Sargent has also held multiple administrative roles within the University of Toronto. From 2009 to 2012, he served as Associate Chair of Research, for the Department of Electrical and Computer Engineering. He was the Vice-Dean, Research for the Faculty of Applied Science and Engineering from 2012 to 2016. Sargent served as the vice-president, International for the University of Toronto from 2016 to 2020, helping to recruit new international graduate student researchers. Since 2020, he has served as the vice-president, Research and Innovation, and Strategic Initiatives.

Sargent has held several visiting professorships. From 2004 to 2005, he was a Nanotechnology and Photonics Visiting professor at the MIT Microphotonics Center. In 2013 he was a Fulbright Visiting professor at UCLA. In fall of 2017, he was a Somorjai Visiting Miller Professor at UC Berkeley, and in April 2018 he was a Distinguished Visiting professor at the Rowland Institute at Harvard University.

In 2005, he published for the general public about nanotechnology and its applications in everyday life, The Dance of Molecules: How Nanotechnology is Changing Our Lives.

=== University spin-offs ===
Sargent has also co-founded several university spin-off companies. In 2006, he founded InVisage Technologies, which was acquired by Apple in 2017. With Prof. Shana Kelley, Sargent co-founded Xagenic in 2010, a molecular diagnostics company. Xagenic was partially acquired in 2018 by the General Atomics - Electromagnetic Systems Group (GA-EMS). With Dr. Sjoerd Hoogland, Sargent also co-founded QD Solar in 2014, which aims to develop tandem solar cells using perovskites and quantum dots.

== Awards and memberships ==
Sargent has been honored with multiple awards and learned society memberships for his research, including:

- Fellow of the American Association for the Advancement of Science since 2009
- Fellow of the Institute of Electrical and Electronics Engineers since 2011
- Fellow of the Canadian Academy of Engineering since 2014
- Awarded an NSERC Silver Medal in 1999
- D. N. Chorafas Foundation Award in 2000
- Outstanding Engineer Award of the IEEE Canada in 2002
- Named a Top 20 Researcher Under Age 40 by the Canadian Institute for Advanced Research in 2002
- Named a TR100 Innovator Under 35 by the MIT Technology Review in 2003
- Named one of Canada's Top 40 Under 40 for 2003-2004
- Named a member of the Scientific American 50 for 2004-2005
- Named a KAUST Global Research Partnership Investigator in 2008
- Awarded the Steacie Prize in 2012
- Awarded the NSERC Brockhouse Award in Interdisciplinary Research and Engineering with Shana Kelley in 2016
- Awarded a Killam Prize for Engineering in 2020

== Personal life ==
Sargent is married to fellow Northwestern Professor Shana Kelley. They met at a nanotechnology conference at UC Irvine, and have two children together.
