= Donald Katz =

Donald Katz may refer to:

- Don Katz, American author, businessman, and founder of Audible
- Donald L. Katz, American chemical engineer
