= Steacie Prize =

Scientific prize

The Steacie Prize is a scientific prize awarded to a scientist or engineer of 40 years or younger for outstanding research in Canada. The Steacie Prize is advertised as Canada’s most prestigious early career award. It was first awarded in 1964, to Jan Van Kranendonk, and it has since been given annually. The award is named in honor of Edgar William Richard Steacie and is funded from the E.W.R. Steacie Memorial Fund, which was established via contributions from colleagues and friends of Steacie.

== Steacie Prize Winners ==
Source: Recipients - Steacie Prize for Natural Sciences

- 2025 – Nicolas Papernot
- 2024 – Jo Bovy
- 2023 – Asim Biswas
- 2022 – Meghan Azad and Catherine Lebel
- 2021 – Erin Johnson
- 2020 – Paul McNicholas
- 2019 – Mary O’Connor
- 2018 – Tomislav Friščić
- 2017 – Milica Radisic
- 2016 – Stephen Wright
- 2015 – Aneil Agrawal
- 2014 – Mark MacLachlan
- 2013 – Paul Ayers
- 2012 – Edward H. Sargent
- 2011 – Shana Kelley
- 2010 – Aaron Hertzmann
- 2009 – Ray Jayawardhana
- 2008 – Dennis Hall
- 2007 – Sarah Otto
- 2006 – Victoria Kaspi
- 2005 – Troy Day
- 2004 – Doug Crawford
- 2003 – Stephen W. Scherer
- 2002 – Natalie Strynadka
- 2001 – Jerry X. Mitrovica
- 2000 – Ian Manners
- 1999 – Lewis E. Kay
- 1998 – Brett Finlay
- 1997 – Terry Snutch
- 1996 – Sajeev John
- 1995 – Jingming Xu
- 1994 – Gilles Brassard
- 1993 – Verena Tunnicliffe
- 1992 – John Smol
- 1991 – Norman Dovichi
- 1990 – Michael P. Walsh
- 1989 – Dick Bond (astrophysicist)
- 1988 – Ian Affleck and Scott Tremaine
- 1987 – Gilles Fontaine
- 1986 – Nathan Isgur
- 1985 – Tak Wah Mak and Tito Scaiano
- 1984 – Terry J. Beveridge
- 1983 – W. G. Unruh
- 1982 – Brian D. Sykes
- 1981 – G.W.F. Drake
- 1980 – G. Michaud
- 1979 – G. Rostoker
- 1978 – David William Boyd and Walter N. Hardy
- 1977 – P.C. Greiner
- 1976 – Rein Luus
- 1975 – Jules Carbotte
- 1974 – Pierre Deslongchamps
- 1973 – Phil Gold
- 1972 – T. Oka
- 1971 – George Grätzer
- 1970 – Peter Maitlis
- 1969 – Frank S. La Bella
- 1968 – Hugh J. Greenwood
- 1967 – Myer Bloom
- 1966 – G.H. Dixon
- 1965 – Neil Bartlett and John Polanyi
- 1964 – Jan Van Kranendonk
