= Christman =

Christman is a surname. Notable people with the surname include:

- Allen Bert Christman, American cartoonist
- Karen Christman, American bioengineer
- Daniel W. Christman, American general
- Mark Christman, American baseball player
- Otto Christman, Canadian soccer player
- Paul Christman, American football player
- Tim Christman, American baseball player
- Tory Christman, Scientology critic
- William Henry Christman, American soldier

== See also ==
- Adam Cristman (born 1985), American soccer player
- Franklin W. Cristman (1869–1942), New York politician
- Chrisman (surname)
