= Ipatiev =

Ipatiev may refer to:

- Ipatiev House, a house in Yekaterinburg, Russia where Nicholas II and his family were killed
- Ipatiev Monastery, a monastery in Kostroma, Russia
- Hypatian Codex (also known Ipatiev Chronicle)
- Vladimir Ipatieff (also spelled Ipatiev), a Russian and American chemist
