= Chrisman (surname) =

Chrisman is a surname. Notable people with the surname include:

- Arthur Bowie Chrisman (1889–1953), American writer
- Drue Chrisman (born 1997), American football player
- Jack Chrisman (1928–1989), American drag racer
- James Chrisman (1818–1881), American lawyer and politician
- Marshall Chrisman (born 1933), American businessman and politician
- Robert Chrisman (1937–2013), American poet, academic and writer
- William Chrisman (1822–1897), American lawyer and politician

== See also ==
- Christman
