= Avel·lí Corma Canós =

Spanish chemist

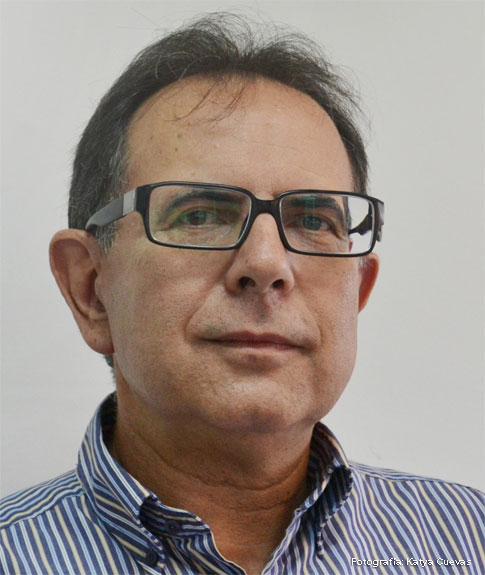
- Born: December 15, 1951 (age 74); Moncofa (Castellón, Land of Valencia), Spain
- Education: Universitat de València, Universidad Complutense de Madrid
- Awards: Fellow of the Royal Society
- Scientific career
- Fields: chemistry
- Workplaces: Consejo Superior de Investigaciones Científicas, Universidad Politecnica de Valencia
- Website: avelinocorma.com

Avel·lí Corma i Canós ForMemRS (born December 15, 1951; name in Catalan-Valencian, also Avelino in Spanish) is a Spanish chemist distinguished for his world-leading work on heterogeneous catalysis.

He received a Bachelor of Science in chemistry from the University of València (1967-1973) and a Ph.D. in chemistry from the Universidad Complutense de Madrid in 1976. In 1979 he started working as a researcher at the Consejo Superior de Investigaciones Científicas, and in 1987 he was a full professor. He has been carrying out research in heterogeneous catalysis in academia and in collaboration with companies. He has worked on fundamental aspects of acid-base and redox catalysis with the aim of understanding the nature of the active sites and reaction mechanisms. Based on these aspects, he has developed catalysts that are being used commercially in several industrial processes.

He has published more than 1200 documents and has more than 200 patents. Over 20 of those patents have been applied industrially in commercial processes of cracking, desulfuration, isomerization, epoxidation, chemo selective oxidation of alcohols and chemoselective hydrogenations.

Corma Canós was elected a member of the National Academy of Engineering (USA) in 2007 for contributions to the understanding of heterogeneous catalysis that led to numerous commercialized solid catalysts used worldwide.

In a 2022 ACS Catalysis paper, Corma Canós was described as "one of the most influential scientists in the field of heterogeneous catalysis and materials science". A special issue in Chemistry, an MDPI journal, was published in his honor.

== Awards ==
- BBVA Foundation Frontiers of Knowledge Award (2024)
- Gold Medal of the European Chemical Society (2024)
- European Inventor Award for Lifetime Achievement (2023)
- Spiers Memorial Award, Royal Society of Chemistry, UK (2016)
- Princess of Asturias Awards for Technical & Scientific Research (2014)
- Honour Medal to the Invention from the Fundación García Cabrerizo (Spain) (2012)
- Grande Medaille de l´Académie des sciences (France), (2011)
- Scientific Merit of Generalitat Valenciana (2011)
- Gold of Medal for Chemistry Research Career 2001-2010 (2010)
- Eni Award (2010)
- Royal Society of Chemistry Centenary Prize (2010)
- Rhodia Pierre-Gilles de Gennes Prize for Science and Industry (2010)
- Bourdart Award in Advanced Catalysis (2009)
- A. V. Humboldt - J. C. Mutis Research Award (2009)
- Gabor A. Somorjai Award for Creative Research in Catalysis (2008)
- Karl-Ziegler-Lectureship Max Planck Society (2007)
- National Award on Science and Technology of México (2006)
- Alwin Mittasch of Dechema (2006)
- Paul Sabatier of the French Society of Chemistry (2006)
- Iberoamerican Federation of Catalysis Societies (FISOCAT) (2006)
- Cross Canada Lecture Award (2006)
- Gold of Medal of the Royal Society of Chemistry os Spain (2005)
- Breck Award of the International Zeolite Association (IZA) (2004)
- Medal of Honor of the García Cabrerizo Foundation (2004)
- Order of Merit Civil of Spain (2002)
- Eugene J. Houdry Award in Applied Catalysis (2002)
- F. Gault European Award on “Catalysis” (2001)
- Ipatieff Actr at Northwestern University (2000-2001)
- King Jaime I Award on “New Technologies” (Spain) (2000)
- Iberdrola Science and Technology (Spain) (1998)
- F. Ciapetta award of the North American Catalyst Society (1998)
- CATSA in recognition of research excellence “Dinstinguished Visitor Award of the Catalysis Society of South Africa”. (1998)
- Burdiñola Award (Spain) (1997)
- "Profesores Visitantes de Iberdrola" (Spain) (1996)
- Dupont Award on “Materials Science” (Spain) (1995)
- National Award "Leonardo Torres Quevedo" (Spain) (1995)
- Dupont Award (Canada)
