= Esther Takeuchi =

American chemical engineer and materials scientist (born 1953)

- Estere Sāns
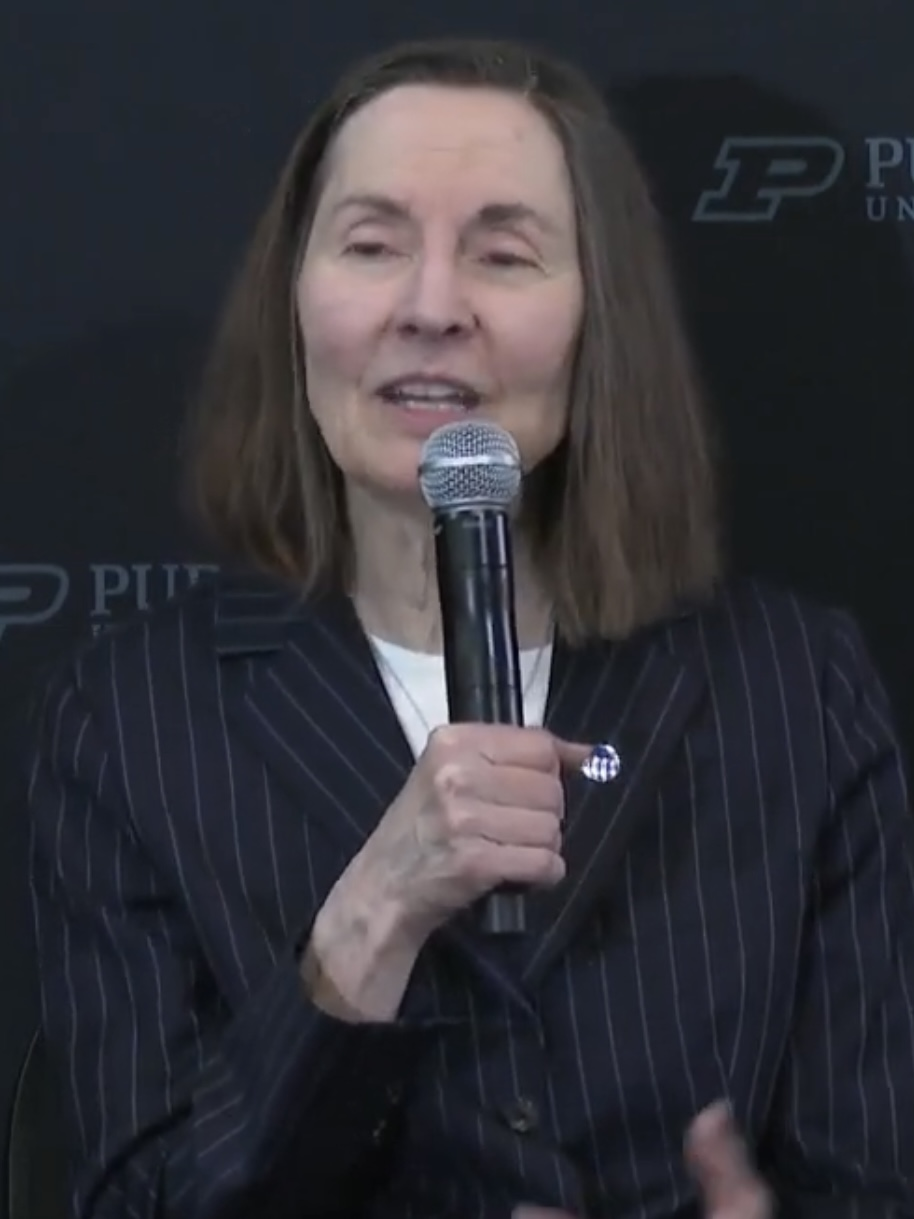
- Takeuchi in 2023
- Born: September 8, 1953 (age 73); Kansas City, Missouri, United States
- Education: University of Pennsylvania; Ohio State University
- Spouse: Kenneth J. Takeuchi
- Awards: E. V. Murphree Award (2013); National Inventors Hall of Fame
- Scientific career
- Fields: Materials Science
- Workplaces: Stony Brook University; University at Buffalo

Esther Sans Takeuchi (born Esther Sans, Latvian: Estere Sāns) is a materials scientist and chemical engineer, working on energy storage systems and power sources for biomedical devices. She is also a distinguished professor at Stony Brook University and a chief scientist at Brookhaven National Laboratory. She holds more than 150 U.S. patents. “The battery was invented once and reinvented over 100 times. I don’t own the patent. The company does. It was called Greatbatch. Now it’s called Integer Corp. When you join a company, you sign over your patent rights to the company.”

== Life and career ==
Takeuchi is the daughter of Mary (Marija) and Rudolf Sans (Rūdolfs Sāns), Second World War refugees from Latvia. Rudolf and Mary fled Soviet-occupied Latvia for Germany in 1945, living in a refugee camp for several years, ultimately immigrating to the United States.

Takeuchi graduated from the University of Pennsylvania in 1975 having majored in chemistry and history. She then worked on her Ph.D. in organic chemistry at the Ohio State University until 1981, under the direction of Dr. Harold Shechter. Her graduate research focused on the reactions of alkoxides with (chloromethyl)trisubstituted silanes.

While working on her Ph.D., she met Kenneth J. Takeuchi and the two married on May 15, 1982.

After completing post-doctoral training in electrochemistry at the University of North Carolina at Chapel Hill and the University of Buffalo, she worked at Greatbatch Inc. in Clarence, New York for 22 years. It was here, under the funding of Wilson Greatbatch, that Takeuchi continued development of the Li/SVO battery. She has also worked on batteries for neuro stimulators, drug delivery systems, pacemakers, and also industrial batteries for environments concerning high temperatures, vibrations, and need of reliability.

In 2007, she joined academia at the University of Buffalo as the Greatbatch Professor of Advanced Power Sources. She is currently a distinguished professor at Stony Brook University in the departments of chemistry, and material science and engineering. She was selected as the 2013 recipient of the E.V. Murphree Award in Industrial and Engineering Chemistry, sponsored by Exxon Mobil. Takeuchi is also a Fellow of The Electrochemical Society and served as the organization's president from 2011–2012.

== Research projects ==
On July 16, 2018, Takeuchi’s company was awarded a $12 million grant from the US Department of Energy, to focus on the development of high energy and high power batteriesfor use in electric vehicles or in combination with renewable solar energy systems and renewable energy farms. The company also has several projects funded by the DOE and supported by partners such as Mercedes-Benz.

== Vision ==
Takeuchi envisions creating an entity bringing together Stony Brook, Brookhaven National Lab, federal funding, state funding, industry, and philanthropy, creating an institute focused on energy and the environment.

== Recognition ==
Takeuchi has been primarily recognized and awarded for her innovation regarding implantable cardiac defibrillators. The innovation is a new type of battery technology regarding a new cathode material, highly conductive electrolyte, and a cell design enabling high power and resulting in the creation of a silver vanadium oxide battery. The batteries are powerful, miniature in size, and have a long life, characteristics that benefit ICDs and their ability to help people with irregular rhythms and beating frequencies within their hearts. The SVO batteries can last for around five years, compared to the average life of around a year for the other forms of batteries. If traditional forms of batteries are used, patients with the implant have to go through surgery regularly to replace the devices and ensure the functionality of the implant, so the use of SVO batteries means that devices need to be replaced less frequently. Initially launched into the marketplace in the late 1980s and early 1990s, these SVO batteries are still prevalent and widely used today.

== Awards ==
- European Inventor Award in the "non-EPO countries" category, presented by the European Patent Office (EPO), 2018
- E.V. Murphree Award in Industrial & Engineering Chemistry, American Chemical Society, 2013
- Elected, National Academy of Engineering, 2004
- Fellow, American Institute for Medical and Biological Engineering, 1999
- National Medal of Technology and Innovation, 2008 – for inventing the silver vanadium oxide battery that powers implantable cardiac defibrillators
- Inductee, National Inventors Hall of Fame, 2011
- Fellow, American Academy of Arts and Sciences, 2021
- NAS Award in Chemical Sciences (2022)

== Books ==
- Vanadium: Chemistry, Biochemistry, Pharmacology and Practical Applications / Edition 1, by Alan S. Tracey, Gail R. Willsky, Esther S. Takeuchi
