= John H. Sinfelt =

American chemical engineer

John H. Sinfelt (February 18, 1931, in Munson, Clearfield County, Pennsylvania – May 28, 2011, in Morristown, New Jersey) was an American chemical engineer whose research on catalytic reforming helped lead to the introduction of unleaded gasoline.

Sinfelt worked for the Standard Oil Development Company (now Exxon Mobil Research and Engineering), where he specialized in developing techniques to speed up chemical reactions. He later patented that method.

== Honors and awards ==
- 1975 National Academy of Engineering
- 1977 Dickson Prize in Science
- 1978 James C. McGroddy Prize for New Materials
- 1979 National Medal of Science
- 1979 elected to the U.S. National Academy of Sciences
- 1989 elected to the American Academy of Arts and Sciences
- 1984 Perkin Medal
- 1984 American Institute of Chemists Gold Medal
- 1986 E. V. Murphree Award in Industrial and Engineering Chemistry
- 1988 Chemical Pioneer Award
- 1994 elected to the American Philosophical Society
