= Tomislav Friščić =

Canadian and Croatian Chemist

- Education: University of Zagreb University of Iowa University of Cambridge
- Awards: Harrison-Meldola Memorial Prizes (2011); RSC ChemComm Emerging Investigator Award and Lectureship for Organic Chemistry (2014); Rutherford Memorial Medal (2018); Steacie Prize (2018); Canadian Society for Chemistry Award for Research Excellence in Materials Chemistry (2019) "Spiridion Brusina" Medal of the Croatian Society for Natural Sciences (2021); NSERC John C. Polanyi Award (2022)
- Scientific career
- Fields: Chemistry
- Workplaces: University of Birmingham (2022-present); McGill University (2011-2022)
- Academic advisors: Branko Kaitner; Leonard MacGillivray
- Website: friscic-research.com

Tomislav Friščić holds the Leverhulme International Professorship and Chair in Green and Sustainable chemistry at the University of Birmingham. His research focus is at the interface of green chemistry and materials science, developing solvent-free chemistry and mechanochemistry for the cleaner, efficient synthesis of molecules and materials, including organic solids such as pharmaceutical cocrystals, coordination polymers and Metal-Organic Frameworks (MOFs), and a wide range of organic targets such as active pharmaceutical ingredients. He is a Fellow of the Royal Society of Chemistry (RSC), member of the College of New Scholars, Artists and Scientists of the Royal Society of Canada and a corresponding member of the Croatian Academy of Sciences and Arts. He has served on the Editorial Board of CrystEngComm, the Early Career Board of the ACS journal ACS Sustainable Chemistry & Engineering, and was an Associate Editor for the journal Molecular Crystals & Liquid Crystals as well as for the journal Synthesis. He was a Topic Editor and Social Media Editor, and is currently a member of the Editorial Advisory Board of the journal Crystal Growth & Design published by the American Chemical Society (ACS). He famously has a dog named Zizi.

== Education ==
Friščić was born in 1978, and received his B.Sc. in 2001 from the University of Zagreb with Prof. Branko Kaitner. He then moved to obtain a Ph.D. with Prof. Leonard R. MacGillivray at the University of Iowa until 2006. He was a postdoctoral research associate with Prof. William Jones at the Pfizer Institute for Pharmaceutical Materials Science and University of Cambridge (2006-2008), and then a Herchel Smith Research Fellow and a Fellow of Sidney Sussex College at the University of Cambridge (2008-2011).

== Career and research ==
Friščić started his tenure track in 2011 at the Chemistry Department of McGill University in Montréal as an assistant professor, received tenure and was promoted to associate professor and William Dawson Scholar in 2016. He has been a full Professor of Chemistry since 2019, and in 2020 he was elected Tier-1 Canada Research Chair in mechanochemistry and solid-state chemistry. In 2022 he and his group relocated to the University of Birmingham with the support of the Leverhulme Trust to pursue research in sustainable, green chemistry through diverse types of solid-state reactivity, such as mechanochemistry, thermochemistry, photochemistry, and more.

His group's research focuses on using solvent-free green chemistry, including mechanochemistry, accelerated aging, reactive aging (RAging) and other related techniques like Resonant Acoustic Mixing or SpeedMixing for various applications, such as noble metal recycling or enzymatic depolymerization of cellulose or artificial polymers, such as PET. In 2011 his team developed a solventless mechanochemical route to the active pharmaceutical ingredient bismuth subsalicylate, and in 2014 to sulfonyl-urea based antidiabetic agents such as Tolbutamide. In 2016, this pioneering work in mechanochemical pharmaceutical synthesis led his team to coin the term medicinal mechanochemistry, describing the use of mechanochemical techniques for the synthesis and processing of pharmaceutically-relevant materials and molecules. With his former student Dr. Cristina Mottillo he founded in 2016 a startup called ACSYNAM, that develops and manufactures hypergolic MOFs as greener, advanced fuels for rocket and space propulsion.

== Selected publications ==
Metal recycling

- Oxidative Mechanochemistry: Direct, Room‐Temperature, Solvent‐Free Conversion of Palladium and Gold Metals into Soluble Salts and Coordination Complexes

Acoustic mixing

- Simple, scalable mechanosynthesis of metal–organic frameworks using liquid-assisted resonant acoustic mixing

Solid-state enzymatic depolymerisation of cellulose

- Solvent‐Free Enzyme Activity: Quick, High‐Yielding Mechanoenzymatic Hydrolysis of Cellulose into Glucose

Hypergolic MOFs for rocket fuel applications

- Hypergolic Triggers as Co‐crystal Formers: Co‐crystallization for Creating New Hypergolic Materials with Tunable Energy Content
- Hypergolic zeolitic imidazolate frameworks (ZIFs) as next-generation solid fuels: Unlocking the latent energetic behavior of ZIFs
