= Vladimir Ipatieff =

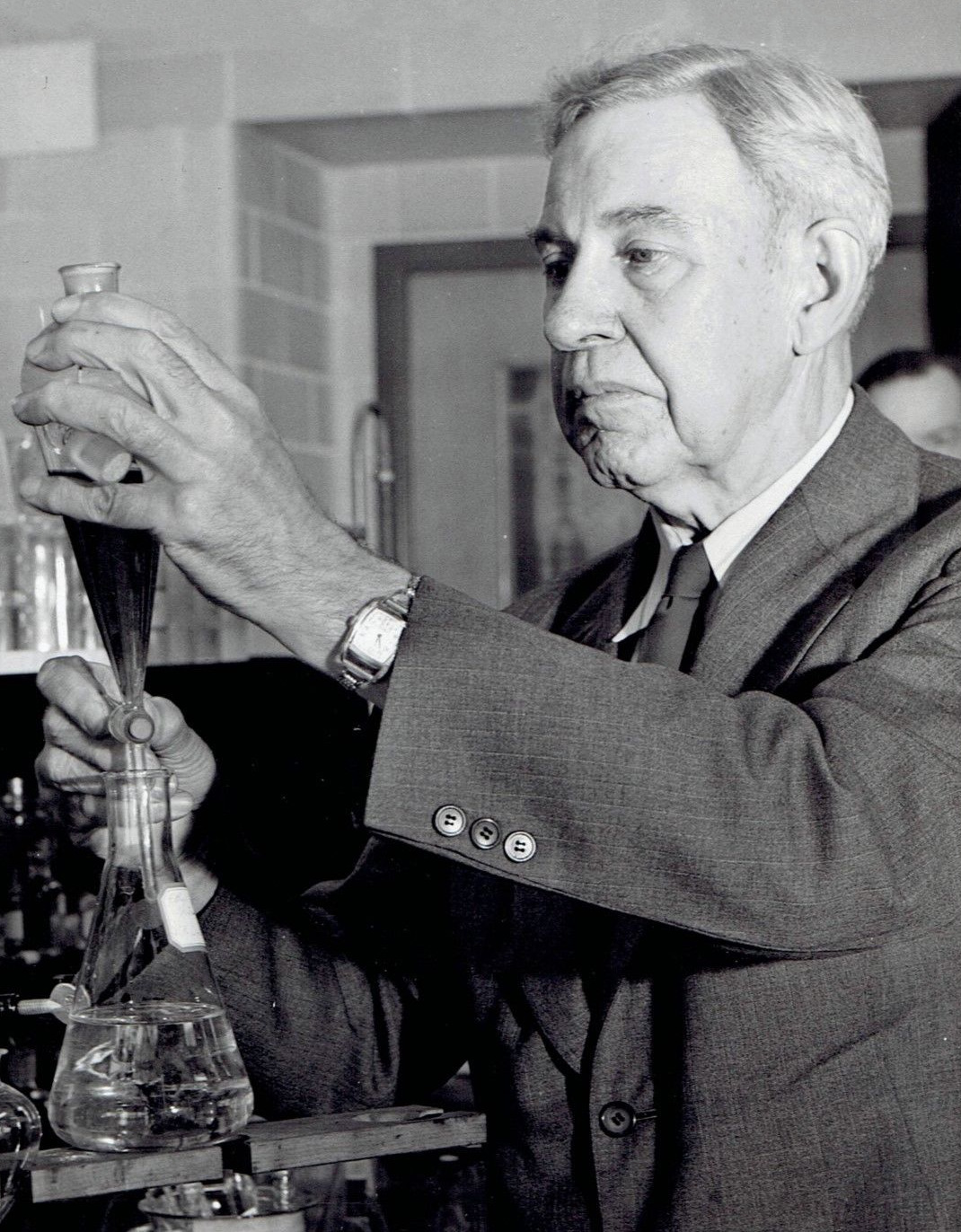
- Ipatieff in 1943
- Born: Vladimir Nikolayevich Ipatieff; November 21, 1867; Moscow, Russian Empire
- Died: November 29, 1952 (aged 85); Chicago, U.S.
- Awards: Willard Gibbs Award (1940)
- Scientific career
- Workplaces: Northwestern University
- Doctoral advisor: Alexei Yevgrafovich Favorskii

Vladimir Nikolayevich Ipatieff, also Ipatyev (Russian: Владимир Николаевич Ипатьев; 21 November [O.S. 9 November] 1867 – 29 November 1952) was a Russian and American chemist. His most important contributions are in the field of petroleum chemistry and catalysts.

== Life and career ==
Born in Moscow, Ipatieff first studied artillery in the Mikhailovskaya Artillery Academy in Petersburg, then later studied chemistry in Russia with Alexei Yevgrafovich Favorskii and in Germany. The prominence of his extended family is illustrated by the fact that the July 17, 1918, murders of Czar Nicholas Romanoff, the Empress and the rest of the royal family took place in the basement of a vacation house owned by the Ipatieff family in Ekaterinburg. His first works in chemistry were devoted to the study of metals and explosives. Later, his works on catalysis methods under high pressure made him famous as a chemist; for his reactions he used massive steel autoclaves (sometimes called Ipatieff bombs). With the start of World War I, Ipatieff organized a dedicated laboratory in Petersburg which made improvements to the chemical weaponry and the methods of chemical protection for the army. Before the October Revolution, Ipatieff was a General-Lieutenant of the Russian army and a member of the Russian Academy of Sciences. He was elected to the Russian Academy of Sciences in 1916.

Although Ipatieff's political sympathies were with the Kadet party, after the Bolshevik Revolution, he agreed to work with the new government, as a specialist adviser and inspector for Vesenka. Ipatieff was active in creating and heading several important chemical research centers in Soviet Russia. Lenin called him "the head of our [Soviet] chemical industry". He was chairman of the Scientific Technical Institute, in 1920-26, but was removed and relegated to the post of vice-chairman of the chemical section of Vesenkha - an early sign that he was coming under suspicion because of his connections with the pre-revolutionary regime. In 1928-29, when he was still the youngest member of the Academy of Sciences, he handled the negotiations which averted a conflict with the regime by admitting Nikolai Bukharin and some other communists to the Academy. At this time, however, Ipatieff was starting to feel threatened because of his past in the Czarist army and because he had friends among those convicted in the Industrial Party trial. In June 1930, Ipatieff, fearing that in time he would be victimized, withdrew a small amount of money from his accounts and prepared to attend an industry conference in Munich. He invited his wife to come with him, and at the last minute suggested she bring her jewels "in the event that we go dancing." As the train came to the border into Poland, he announced to his wife, "Dear, look back at Mother Russia. You will never see her again." Though he spoke not a word of English, he fled to the United States.

In the US, Ipatieff secured a research-focused chemistry professorship at Northwestern University, in the Chicago suburb of Evanston. There, with his assistant Herman Pines, he discovered alternative fuel mixtures and procedures that greatly enhanced engine performance. It is said that after changing to Ipatieff fuel mixtures, the RAF was able to best German planes that had previously outperformed the British. Increasingly, he devoted time to commercial applications of his breakthroughs in fuel chemistry, and worked extensively for UOP LLC (Universal Oil Products).

He and his students made significant contributions to organic synthesis and petroleum refining. He is considered one of the founding fathers of the modern petroleum chemistry in the US.

Vladimir Ipatieff had three sons: Dmitry, Nikolai and Vladimir. Dmitry died in World War I. Nikolai was a member of the White movement, emigrated after the end of Russian Civil War and died in Africa testing a treatment he had invented for yellow fever. Vladimir Vladimirovich Ipatieff, also a talented chemist, remained in the USSR and was punitively arrested after the defection of his father. While living in the USA, the Ipatieffs also adopted two Russian girls.

Ipatieff died suddenly in Chicago in 1952. He held over 200 patents and published over 300 research papers.

== Ipatieff Prize ==
The American Chemical Society received a large endowment owing to UOP and eventually in turn established an award called the Ipatieff Prize. Awarded every three years, the Ipatieff Prize honors outstanding experimental work in the field of catalysis or high-pressure chemistry by researchers under the age of 40.

Year	Recipient
2022	Phillip Christopher
2019	Ive Hermans
2016	Aditya Bhan
2013	Melanie Sanford
2010	Christopher W. Jones
2004	Raul F. Lobo
2001	Joan F. Brennecke
1998	Andrew J. Gellman
1995	Mark Barteau
1992	Mark E. Davis
1989	Alexander M. Klibanov
1986	Robert M. Hazen
1983	D. Wayne Goodman
1980	Denis Forster
1977	Charles A. Eckert
1974	George A. Samara
1971	Paul B. Venuto
1968	Charles R. Adams
1965	Robert H. Wentorf, Jr.
1962	Charles Kemball
1959	Cedomir M. Sliepcevich
1956	Harry G. Drickamer
1953	Robert B. Anderson
1950	Herman E. Ries
1947	Louis Schmerling
