= Doug Crawford =

Canadian neuroscientist

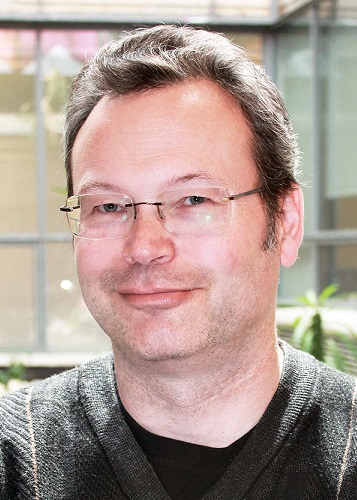
Profile picture of John Douglas (Doug) Crawford

John Douglas (Doug) Crawford is a Canadian neuroscientist and the Scientific Director of the York Centre for Integrative and Applied Neuroscience. He is a professor at York University where he holds the York Research Chair in Visuomotor Neuroscience and the title of Distinguished Research Professor in Neuroscience.

== Biography ==
Crawford grew up in London, Ontario, where he attended the University of Western Ontario. He completed his BSc in physiology and psychology in 1987, studying electrophysiology with Stanley Caveney and Gordon Mogenson. He then studied three-dimensional eye movements with Tutis Vilis at Western, where he held a Medical Research Council (MRC) Studentship (1989-1992) and earned his PhD in physiology in 1993. Following that, he spent two years (1993-1994) studying head-unrestrained gaze control as an MRC post-doctoral fellow with Daniel Guitton at the Montreal Neurological Institute. In 1995 he joined York University's Department of Psychology and York Centre for Vision Research in Toronto as an assistant professor, later attaining cross appointments to the department of Biology, School of Kinesiology & Health Sciences, and the Neuroscience Graduate Diploma Program. During this period he held a MRC Faculty Scholarship (1996-2001), Tier II Canada Research Chair (2001-2007) and Tier I Canada Research Chair (2007-2021) and Now York Research Chair. He became an associate professor in 1999, full professor in 2005, and distinguished research professor in 2013.

== Leadership ==
Crawford was the founding National Coordinator of the Canadian Action and Perception Network (CAPnet), the founding Canadian director of the Brain in Action International Research Training Program, and the founding coordinator of the York Neuroscience Graduate Diploma Program. He founded York's neurophysiology laboratories, was a founding member of Melvyn A. Goodale's CIHR Group for Action and Perception and founding co-principal investigator for the CIHR Strategic Training Program in Vision Health Research. He Founded the VSS Canadian Vision Social and is a member of the Canadian Brain Research Strategy Neuroscience Leaders Group. He has the distinction of being the principal investigator and founding Scientific Director of two Canada First Research Excellence Fund (CFREF)-funded programs: 'Vision: Science to Applications' (VISTA), (2016-2023) and then 'Connected Minds: Neural and Machine Systems for a Healthy, Just Society' (2023-).

== Training ==
Crawford has supervised over 80 graduate students and post-doctorals, many graduating to successful careers in academia, medicine, and industry. Among his noteworthy former trainees are Pieter Medendorp, Director of the Donders Centre for Cognition in Nijmegen, Julio Martinez-Trujillo, Provincial Endowed Academic Chair in Autism at Western University, Gunnar Blohm, Queens Professor and Founding Co-Director of the International Summer School in Computational Sensory-Motor Neuroscience and Neuromatch Academy, Aarlenne Khan, Canada Research Chair in Vision and Action at Université de Montréal, and Denise Henriques, York Professor and principal investigator of York University's Sensorimotor Control Lab. For these activities Crawford received York University's 2003 Faculty of Graduate Studies Teaching Award and 2019 Post-Doctoral Supervisor of the Year Award.

== Research ==
Crawford's research investigates the neural mechanisms of visuospatial memory and sensorimotor transformations for eye, head, and hand motion. Recurrent themes in his work include 1) the idea that early representations of movement goals are stored in visual coordinates, updated during self-motion, and then transformed into three-dimensional (3D) commands for different body parts, 2) the use of theory-driven, multimodal neuroscience techniques, and 3) the use of 3D measurements and analysis of eye and body orientation. His specific contributions can be grouped into three areas:

Physiology of the Primate Gaze System Crawford and colleagues performed the first recordings of 3D Vestibulo-ocular reflex axes and Listing's law during head rotation, and identified the midbrain neural integrators for holding vertical and torsional orientation of both the eye and head. They used brain stimulation neurophysiological recordings to investigate the role of the superior colliculus and frontal cortex in eye-head coordination and reference frame coding, and track their egocentric and allocentric coding mechanisms through time. They also showed that remembered visual stimuli are continuously updated across the superior colliculus during smooth pursuit eye movements.

Human Vision and Eye Movements Crawford and colleagues showed that ocular dominance reverses for left and right visual stimuli, how Listing's law of two eyes interacts with stereopsis and that optimal integration theory can explain perisaccadic change blindness. His lab has used TMS and neuroimaging to show the roles of occipital, parietal, and frontal cortex in Transsaccadic memory of visual features.

Eye-Hand Coordination During Reach. Crawford and colleagues used psychophysics and fMRI to show that human parietal lobe retains and updates saccade and reach goals in gaze-centered coordinates, fMRI and TMS to map saccade vs. reach function in human posterior parietal cortex, fMRI and MEG to track the visuomotor transformations forr reach, and psychophysics, neuroimaging, to determine how allocentric and egocentric representations are stored and integrated for goal-directed reaches.

Crawford has also collaborated with clinician scientists to investigate how these various sensorimotor mechanisms fail during disorders such as amblyopia, cervical dystonia and optic ataxia.

== Research Awards ==
Crawford has been listed amongst the world's top 2% researchers. In addition to the research fellowships, research chairs and teaching awards cited above, Crawford has received various research awards. In 1993, he was awarded the Governor General's Academic Gold medal for his PhD work with Tutis Vilis. Since then, he has won various research prizes, including the 1995 Polanyi Prize in Physiology/Medicine, an Alfred P Sloan Fellowship, the 2000 Ontario Premier's Research Excellence Award, the 2002 CIFAR Young Explorer Award (awarded to the "top 20 young investigators in Canada"), the 2004 Steacie Prize (awarded to "a scientist or engineer of 40 years of age or less for outstanding scientific research carried out in Canada."), the 2016 Canadian Physiological Society Sarrazin Award, and the 2018 York President's Research Excellence Award.
