= Michel Boudart =

Chemical engineer (1924–2012)

- Born: 18 June 1924; Brussels, Belgium
- Died: 2 May 2012 (aged 87); Palo Alto, California
- Education: University of Louvain, Princeton University
- Known for: Catalysis
- Awards: Chemical Pioneer Award (1991); E. V. Murphree Award (1985)
- Scientific career
- Fields: Chemical engineering
- Workplaces: Stanford University
- Doctoral advisor: Hugh Stott Taylor
- Notable students: Enrique Iglesia, Ryong Ryoo, James Dumesic

Michel Boudart (18 June 1924 – 2 May 2012) was the William M. Keck Sr. Professor of Chemical engineering Emeritus at Stanford University.

He earned his BS and MS degrees from the University of Louvain in 1944 and 1947, respectively, and earned his PhD in chemistry from Princeton University in 1950 under the guidance of Hugh Stott Taylor.

He was a professor at Princeton until 1961 and later spent a brief period at the University of California, Berkeley, where he helped establish a program in catalysis and reaction engineering.

Boudart joined Stanford University in 1964, where he was best known for his contributions to catalysis and for his role in the development of chemical engineering at Stanford.

In 1994, he became a professor emeritus. He was a member of the National Academy of Sciences and the National Academy of Engineering and a fellow of the American Association for the Advancement of Science, the American Academy of Arts and Sciences, and the California Academy of Sciences.

== Personal life ==
Born in Brussels, during the Second World War, he was accepted to the University of Louvain but the university was closed. He was married to his wife Marina d'Haese Boudart. They were avid world travelers and had a daughter and three sons.
