= Herman Pines =

Russian-American chemist (1902–1996)

- Born: January 17, 1902; Łódź, Russian Empire
- Died: April 10, 1996 (aged 94); San Rafael, California, U.S.
- Education: École Supérieure de Chimie Physique Électronique de Lyon
- Known for: Catalysis of high-octane fuels
- Scientific career
- Workplaces: Universal Oil Products, Northwestern University

Herman Pines (January 17, 1902 – April 10, 1996) was a Russian Empire–born American chemist and academici. He is best known for his work with Vladimir Ipatieff on the catalytic conversion of high-octane aviation fuel (and innovation credited with helping the Royal Air Force win the Battle of Britain). Because of his scientific contributions, new processes were developed for the isomerization of paraffins, the alkylation of aromatic compounds, and base-catalyzed organic reactions.

== Early life ==
Herman Pines was born on January 17, 1902, to Isaac and Eugenia (Grynfeld) Pines, a Jewish couple in Łódź (then in the Russian Empire, now Poland). Pines left Łódź as a young man, because Jewish quotas and other anti-Jewish practices prevented Jewish students from attending university. Instead Pines went to France to study. In 1927, Pines received a degree in chemical engineering at the École Supérieure de Chimie Industrielle de Lyon (now the École Supérieure de Chimie Physique Électronique de Lyon).

In 1928 Pines emigrated to the United States. After working at routine jobs for a couple of years, he joined Universal Oil Products (now UOP LLC) in McCook, Illinois, in 1930. He began by doing routine analyses, and was later transferred to the research department. By 1930 Pines was a doctoral student at the University of Chicago, and working at UOP. There he met Russian-born Vladimir Ipatieff. Pines became his assistant, beginning a twenty-two-year scientific collaboration. Initially, the two expatriates used French and Russian as working languages, since they spoke both of them better than English.

Studying at night, Pines completed a Ph.D. in organic chemistry at the University of Chicago in 1935 with the thesis A study of the electronegativities of organic radicals.

== Career ==
In 1941, Pines received a part-time research professorship at Northwestern University in Evanston, Illinois. He continued to work for UOP, serving as OUP's full-time Coordinator of Exploratory Research from 1945 to 1951.

After the death of Ipatieff in 1952, Pines left UOP to focus on his work at Northwestern University. In 1953 he became the Ipatieff Research Professor of Chemistry and director of the Ipatieff High Pressure and Catalytic Laboratory. Pines retired from the position in 1970, but continued to be scientifically active as a professor emeritus until a few months before his death on April 10, 1996.

Pines and Ipatieff worked closely together for 22 years, until Ipatieff died and Pines succeeded him at Northwestern University. A modest man who tended to emphasize the contributions of others, Pines has nonetheless been described as "one of the towering scientists of this century". Throughout his career, Pines made significant contributions to the understanding of heterogeneous catalysis and the chemistry of petroleum hydrocarbons.

Ipatieff encouraged each person on his staff to spend 10–15% of their time on a personal project, pleasing to their "chemical soul". Early on, Pines chose to test one of the dominant doctrines of the time: the belief that paraffin hydrocarbons or alkanes were inert substances that did not react with other substances at low temperatures. The very name paraffin reflected this belief, coming from the Latin "parum affinis" (limited affinity).

Pines was able to demonstrate that catalysis could occur at low temperatures, counter to previous belief. At low temperatures, in the presence of sulfuric acid (H_{2}SO_{4}), isoparaffins such as isobutane reacted with olefins. This alkylation process was discovered in 1932 and commercialized in 1938.

Ipatieff and Pines were trying to understand complex chemical reactions that were affected by many factors including temperature, concentration of acid used, and ratio of acid to other compounds. Such reactions often resulted in the formation of a complex mixture of products, including intermediate products which could participate in further reactions.

By working with pure hydrocarbons rather than petroleum fractions, Pines was better able to isolate and understand specific chemical reactions. He emphasized that a reaction was not understood until all the products of the reaction were identified and understood. His student Herbert Appel later recalled being taught, "never to be satisfied with a mechanism until it explains all the products".

Pines was able to understand and describe the isomerization of butanes and pentanes. Isomerization is a rearrangement reaction, in which one molecule is transformed into another that contains the same atoms in a different arrangement. Pines developed a method for the catalytic conversion of n-butane into isobutane. The first step was protonation of butene by sulfuric acid, forming a reactive but short-lived carbenium ion intermediate. The second step was alkylation of isobutane by the carbenium cations. Butane isomerization was discovered in 1935 and commercialized in 1941. Ongoing research into the chemical processes involved showed that it was impossible to achieve isomerization of paraffinic hydrocarbons without a chemical catalyst: heat alone could not be sufficient. Pure n-butane would not react without a source of olefin cations.

The production of isobutane was a necessary step in the production of high-octane gasoline. The catalytic conversion of paraffins into isoparaffins has been described as "one of the cornerstones of the petroleum industry." Combining the processes of alkylation and butane isomerization led to the development of high octane fuels for use in aviation gasoline. Isobutane and C3–C4 olefins are by-products of fluid catalytic cracking and other catalytic and thermal conversion processes. During the alkylation process, light molecular weight iso-paraffins such as isobutane can be combined with C3–C4 olefins to form higher weight iso-paraffins or alkylates that do not contain olefinic or aromatic hydrocarbons.

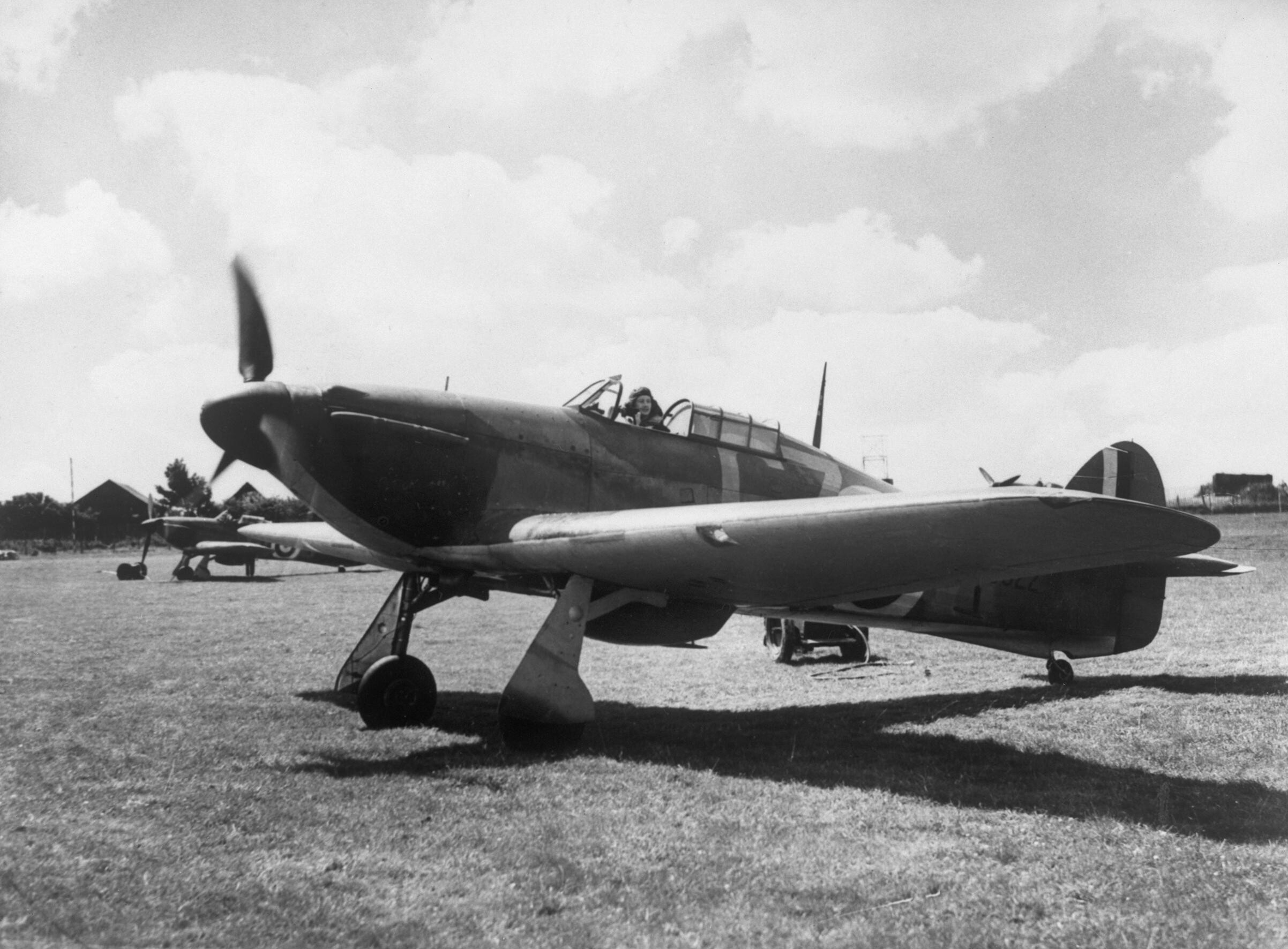
Hawker Hurricane Mk I, July 1940

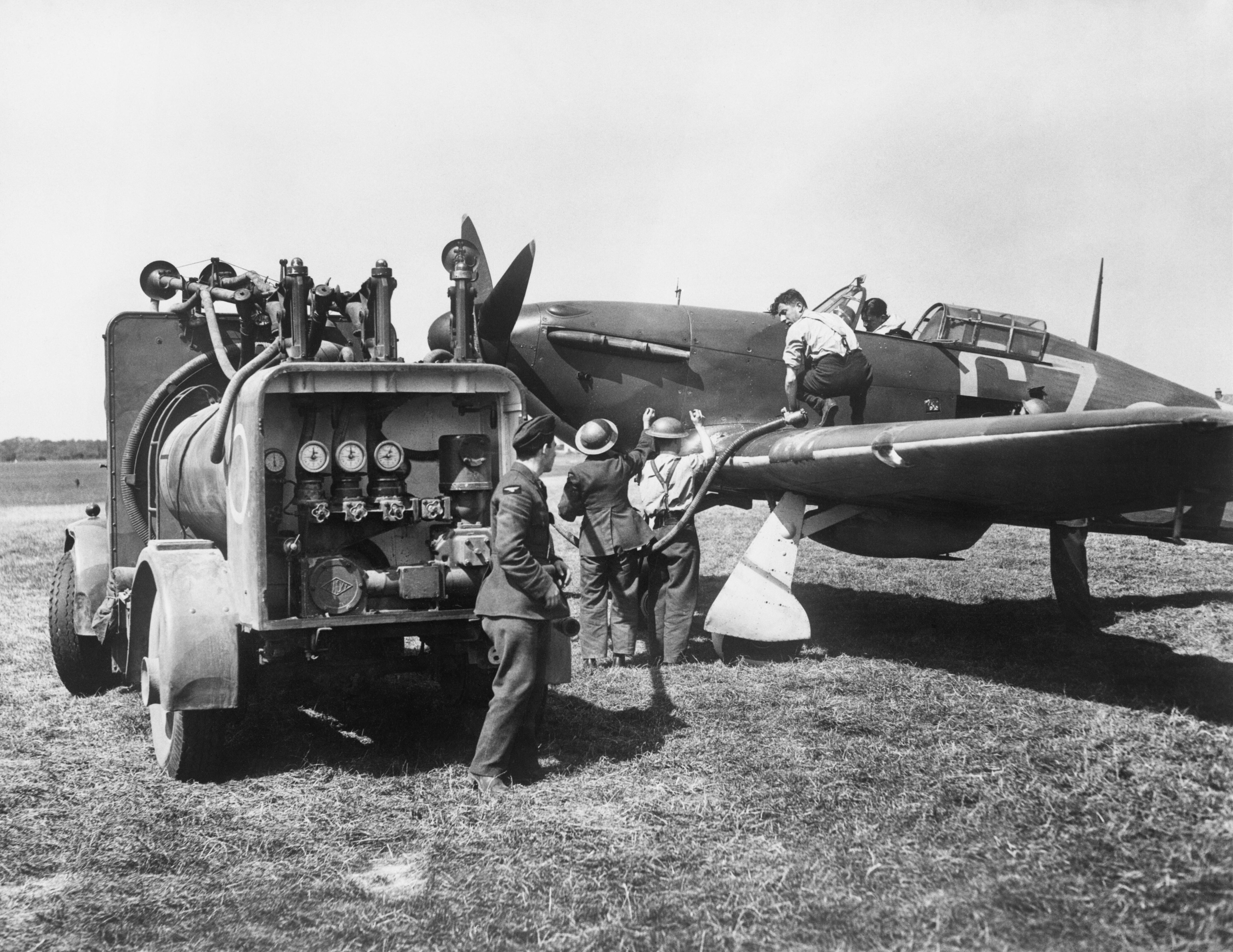
Groundcrew refuelling a Hawker Hurricane Mk I, August 1940

These methods of preparation were kept secret by the Americans during World War II, but the fuels were made available to the Allies for their Spitfires and Hurricanes, and are said to have given the Royal Air Force an advantage in the Battle of Britain. Another war-time accomplishment by Pines and his co-workers was the chemical analysis of the fuel of German aircraft. This enabled the Allies to target mines and other facilities that produced materials critical to the German war effort. Alkylation processes have since been used to produce gasoline for motors, as engines became more powerful. Alkylation can be a preferable process for environmental reasons as well.

Having established that such reactions were possible, Pines and his co-workers explored the mechanisms involved in the catalysis of hydrocarbons. They studied a variety of transformations including "polymerization, alkylation, cyclization, additions, eliminations and hydride transfer reactions." They made basic discoveries that furthered the understanding of mechanisms involving carbonium ions, carbanions, free radicals, intermediates, thermal reactions, and relationships between catalytic behavior and surface chemistry. Pines studied both acid and base catalysis; catalytic properties of aluminas; and aromatization, dehydrogenation and metal hydrogenation catalysts.

He has contributed to understanding the mechanism of dehydration of alcohols on alumina as a catalyst and supporter. He has also examined mechanisms of aromatization of alkanes over chromia. He has analyzed hydrogen transfer reactions involving aromatic hydrocarbons. His work influenced Nobel winner George Andrew Olah, who was able to chemically stabilize carbocations and further investigate their structure and activity.

Pines and Ipatieff's discoveries about the catalysis of hydrocarbon reactions laid fundamental groundwork for the oil refining and chemical industries. These industries use various types of catalysts to unlock the saturated hydrocarbons in natural gas and raw oil. Processes involving noble-metal, liquid- and solid-acid catalysts are essential to the production of energy and of widely-used industrial chemicals in the twentieth century. The work of Pines, Ipatieff, Louis Schmerling, Herman S. Bloch, Vladimir Haensel and others at Universal Oil Products (UOP)'s Riverside Laboratory has been recognized by the presentation of a National Historic Chemical Landmark at the laboratory building in McCook, Illinois, on November 15, 1995.

Pines was a founder of the Catalysis Club of Chicago. Since 1999, the Catalysis Club of Chicago and Honeywell-Universal Oil Products (UOP) have given an annual award, the Herman Pines Award, to recognize exceptional research in catalysis.

== Personal life ==
Pines married Dorothy Mlotek in 1927. The two had known each other in Poland. After her family emigrated to the United States, Mlotek remained in touch with Pines. She visited him twice while he was at university in France, where they married just after he received his degree. Mlotek then returned to the United States, and Pines joined her in Chicago in 1928. She worked for many years as a Hebrew teacher. They had a daughter, Judith "Judy" Pines.

Pines's mother, brothers and uncle, as well as other members of his family were killed during The Holocaust. Pines greatly appreciated the willingness of the United States to welcome refugees, saying.

"The U.S. is the blending place for all people. Here you are valued for who you are and what you can do, not for where you are from. Here outsiders become members of the community very quickly. People don`t understand how difficult that is elsewhere in the world, because here it is so easy. But I know."

Pines died on April 10, 1996 in San Rafael, California.

== Awards ==
- 1946: member of Alpha Gamma chapter of Phi Lambda Upsilon (Honorary Chemical Society) on June 6, 1946
- 1956: Ernest Guenther Award in the Chemistry of Natural Products (originally the Fritzsche Award) from the American Chemical Society
- 1981: Eugene J. Houdry Award in Applied Catalysis
- 1981: George A. Olah Award in Hydrocarbon or Petroleum Chemistry, from the American Chemical Society
- 1982: Chemical Pioneer Award, from the American Institute of Chemists
- 1983: E. V. Murphree Award in Industrial and Engineering Chemistry, from the American Chemical Society
- 1995: Designation of the laboratory building in McCook, Illinois, as a National Historic Chemical Landmark on November 15, 1995

== Publications ==
Pines published at least 265 scientific publications. He held 145 U.S. patents. He co-edited Advances in Catalysis for more than twenty years. He wrote three books:

- Pines, Herman; Stalick, Wayne M. (1977). Base-catalyzed reactions of hydrocarbons and related compounds. New York: Academic Press. ISBN 978-0-12-557150-0.
- Pines, H. (1981). The Chemistry of Catalytic Hydrocarbon Conversions. New York: Academic Press. ISBN 9780323155922.
- Pines, Herman (1992). Genesis and evolution of the Ipatieff Catalytic Laboratory at Northwestern University, 1930-1970. Department of Chemistry, Northwestern University.

== Papers ==
Pines's papers are in the archives of Northwestern University.

- "Herman Pines (1902–1996) Papers". Archival and Manuscript Collections. Northwestern University.
- "Guide to the Herman Pines (1902–1996) Papers 1935/1996". UNCAP. Northwestern University Library.
