= Joan Brennecke =

American chemical engineer

- Education: University of Texas at Austin (BSc); University of Illinois at Urbana–Champaign (MSc, PhD)
- Scientific career
- Workplaces: University of Notre Dame
- Thesis: Intermolecular interactions in supercritical fluid solutions from fluorescence spectroscopy (1989)

Joan F. Brennecke is an American chemical engineer who is the Cockrell Family Chair in Engineering in the McKetta Department of Chemical Engineering at the University of Texas at Austin. Brennecke develops supercritical fluids, ionic liquids and novel spectroscopic methods.

Brennecke was elected a member of the National Academy of Engineering in 2012 for innovation in the use of ionic liquids and supercritical fluids for environmentally benign chemical processing.

She is the Editor-in-Chief of the Journal of Chemical & Engineering Data.

== Early life and education ==
Brennecke grew up along the Gulf Coast of the United States. As a child she lived in Pittsburgh, St. Louis and Kingston, Jamaica, and eventually settled in Victoria, Texas. She became interested in chemical engineering in high school. She attended St. Joseph's High School, where she was valedictorian. She spent her free time in her family garage, taking apart mechanical objects with her father. Her father, uncle and mother worked for engineering companies, and three of her cousins work in professions related to engineering. During her final year of school a director at the nearby DuPont plant read about her achievements in the local newspaper and offered her a sponsored position at the University of Texas at Austin. She completed her undergraduate degree at the University of Texas at Austin in 1984, spending alternate semesters at DuPont research facilities. She moved to the University of Illinois at Urbana–Champaign for her graduate studies, earning her master's degree in 1987 and her doctoral degree in 1989. Her research considered supercritical fluids. She moved to the University of Notre Dame in 1989, where she started her independent academic career, studying how solutes in supercritical fluids could be used to control reaction rates.

== Research and career ==
In 1998 Brennecke was promoted to associate professor at the University of Notre Dame, and in 1998 full professor. She was made Keating-Crawford Professor of Chemical Engineering in 2003, where she directed the Notre Dame Energy Center and the Sustainable Energy Initiative. This role involved initiatives to make nuclear energy safer, develop cleaner fossil fuels and use solar energy for carbon capture and storage. She was the first woman to be made professor in the engineering program at the University of Notre Dame. Brennecke was made the chair of the Council for Chemical Research in 2004.

Brennecke develops novel solvents, including ionic liquids and supercritical fluids. Ionic liquids are liquid at room temperature, have high boiling points and low vapour pressures. Brennecke has proposed that these ionic liquids can be used to develop environmentally friendly processes, as they will not contribute to air pollution. She develops novel techniques to measure the ionicity; a ratio of the molar conductivity, calculated using measurements of impedance and ion diffusivity (which is calculated using the Nernst equation).

In 2018 she returned to the University of Texas at Austin, where she became the first woman professor of chemical engineering, supported by a multi-million dollar grant from the United States Department of Energy and the Governor's University Research Initiative. She was made deputy director of the Center for Innovative and Strategic Transformation of Alkane Resources (CISTAR). CISTAR is supported by the National Science Foundation and looks to make transportation fuels from natural gas.

== Awards and honours ==
- 1998 University of Notre Dame Presidential Award
- 2000 University of Notre Dame College of Engineering Outstanding Teacher of the Year Award
- 2002 Kaneb Teaching Award
- 2001 American Chemical Society Ipatieff Prize
- 2006 American Institute of Chemical Engineers Professional Progress Award
- 2007 Conference on Properties and Phase Equilibria for Product and Process Design John M. Prausnitz Award
- 2008 American Chemical Society Julius Stieglitz Lecturer Award
- 2009 United States Department of Energy Ernest Orlando Lawrence Award
- 2011 Times Higher Education Top 100 Chemists
- 2012 Elected Member of the National Academy of Engineering
- 2014 Thomson Reuter's list of the World's Most Influential Scientific Minds
- 2015 University of Illinois at Urbana–Champaign Parr Lecturer

== Selected publications ==
- Blanchard, Lynnette A.; Hancu, Dan; Beckman, Eric J.; Brennecke, Joan F. (1999). "Green processing using ionic liquids and CO 2". Nature. 399 (6731): 28–29. Bibcode:1999Natur.399...28B. doi:10.1038/19887. ISSN 1476-4687. S2CID 26690265.
- Brennecke, Joan F.; Maginn, Edward J. (2001). "Ionic liquids: Innovative fluids for chemical processing". AIChE Journal. 47 (11): 2384–2389. Bibcode:2001AIChE..47.2384B. doi:10.1002/aic.690471102.
- Fredlake, Christopher P.; Crosthwaite, Jacob M.; Hert, Daniel G.; Aki, Sudhir N. V. K.; Brennecke, Joan F. (2004). "Thermophysical Properties of Imidazolium-Based Ionic Liquids". Journal of Chemical & Engineering Data. 49 (4): 954–964. doi:10.1021/je034261a. ISSN 0021-9568.

Brennecke was made Editor-in-Chief of the Journal of Chemical & Engineering Data in 2010.
