= Karen Christman =

American bioengineer and academic

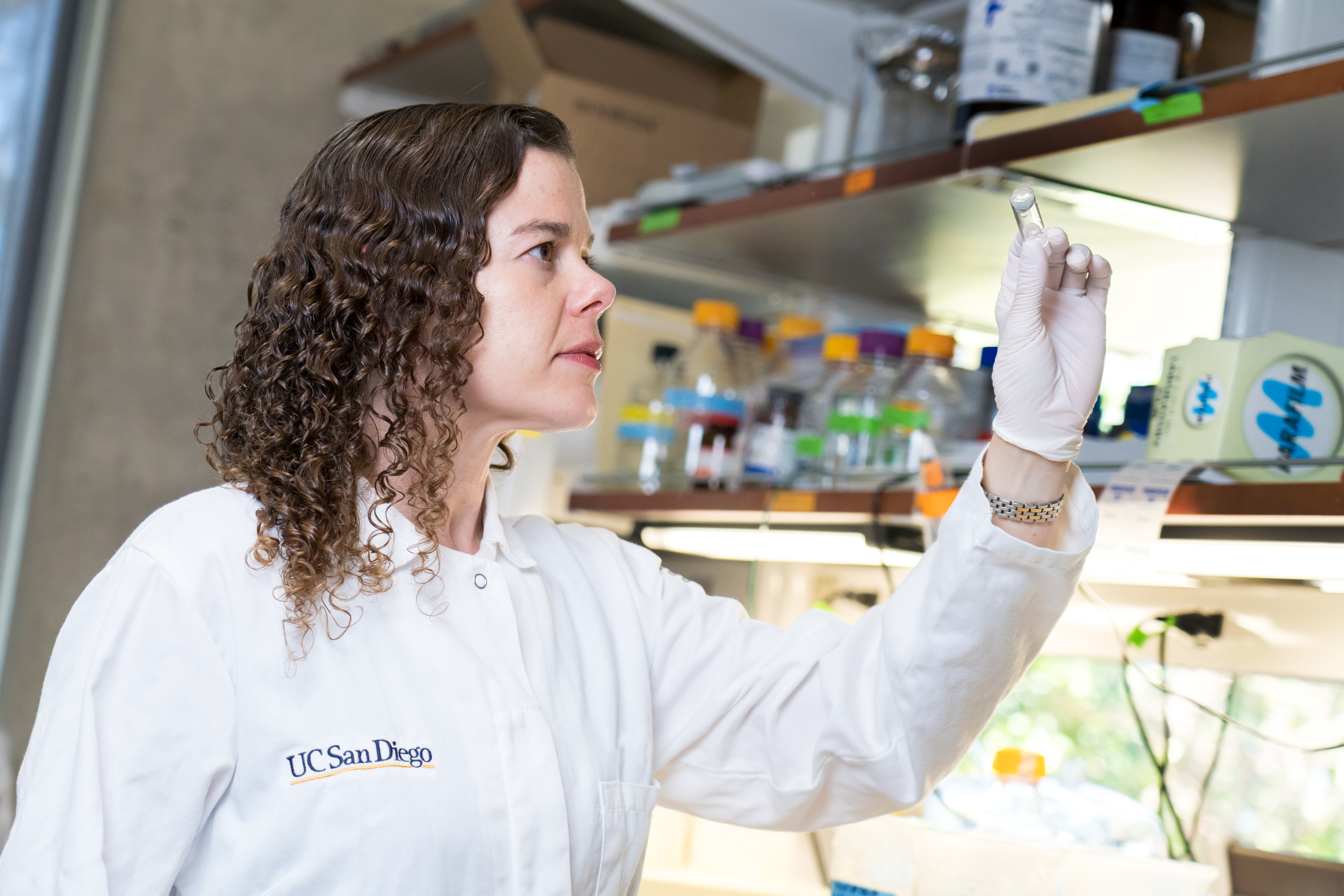
- Christman in 2019
- Born: Karen Leigh Christman
- Education: Northwestern University; University of California, San Francisco
- Scientific career
- Workplaces: University of California, San Diego; University of California, Los Angeles
- Thesis: In situ engineered myocardial tissue (2003)
- Academic advisors: Heather Maynard
- Website: christman.eng.ucsd.edu

Karen Leigh Christman is an American bioengineer who is the Associate Dean for Faculty Affairs and the Pierre Galletti Endowed Chair for Bioengineering Innovation at University of California, San Diego. Her research considers regenerative medicine and tissue engineering. She was elected a Fellow of the National Academy of Inventors in 2023.

== Early life and education ==
Christman studied biomedical engineering at Northwestern University. She moved to California in 2000, where she earned her graduate degrees. Christman was a doctoral researcher at the University of California, San Francisco (USCF), where she developed in situ approaches for myocardial tissue engineering. She has said that she started working in bioengineering to find a way to help patients.

== Research and career ==
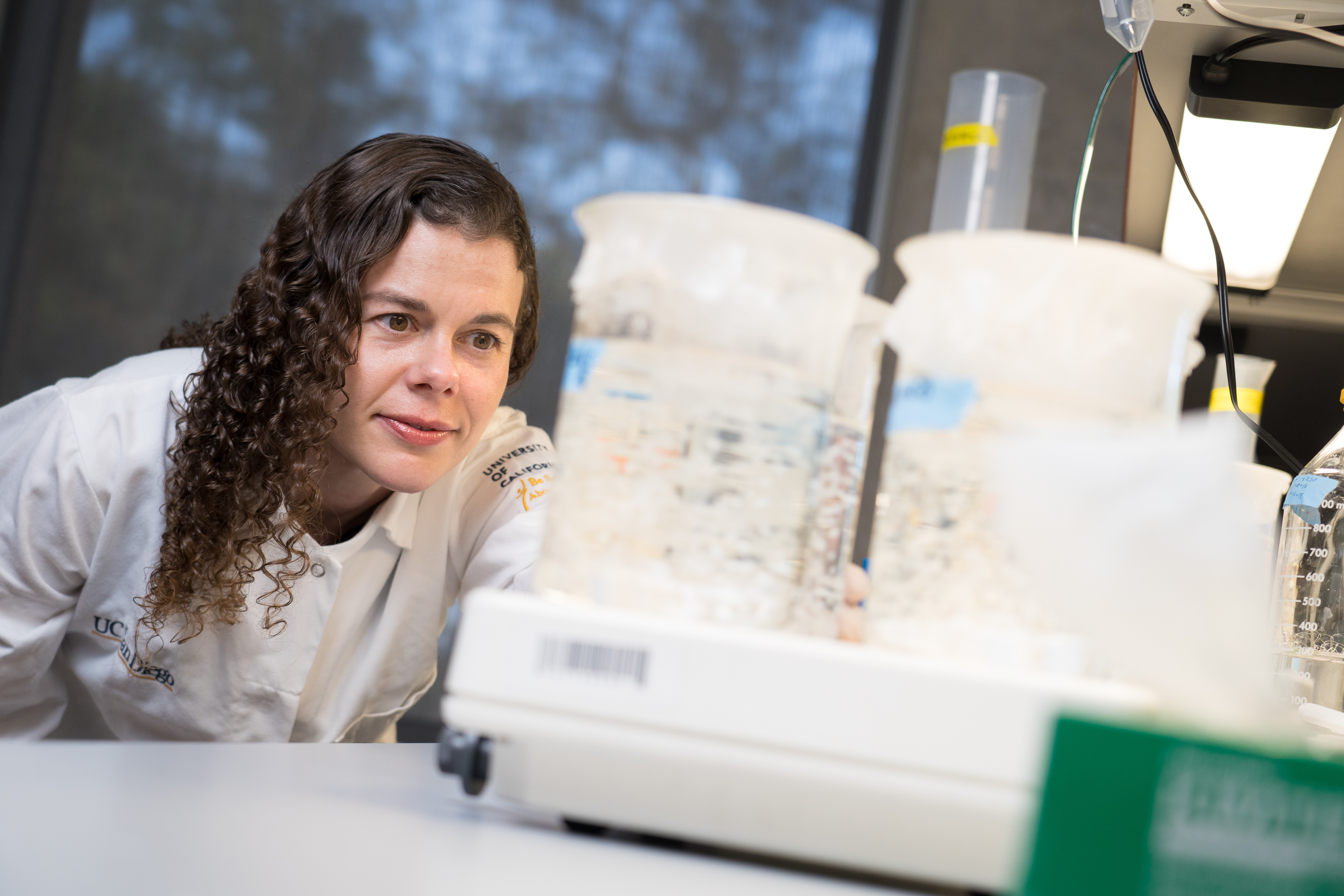
Christman in 2019

After her PhD, she moved to the University of California, Los Angeles for postdoctoral research, working with Heather Maynard on polymer chemistry to develop new strategies for site-specific patterning of proteins. In 2007, Christman joined the Department of Bioengineering at UC San Diego. She develops materials for tissue engineering and regenerative medicine. Her research considers naturally occurring and synthetically derived hydrogels to repair and regenerate tissue. She looks to use these hydrogels for non-invasive therapeutic interventions. In particular, Christman has studied myocardial infarction, which is a leading cause of death worldwide and from which many people do not recover full function.

In 2017, Christman was one of the most highly funded researchers at UC San Diego, receiving a large grant from the California Institute for Regenerative Medicine to study peripheral artery disease. She is the founder of Ventrix, Inc, which looks to create a new class of biotherapeutics that help the extracellular matrix guide the body to generate healthy tissue.

Christman serves as editor-in-chief of NPG Regenerative Medicine.

=== Awards and honors ===
- NIH Director's New Innovator and Transformative Research Awards
- Tissue Engineering and Regenerative Medicine Society Young Investigator Award
- Tissue Engineering and Regenerative Medicine Society Senior Scientist Award
- Fellow of the American Institute for Medical and Biological Engineering
- Fellow of the National Academy of Inventors

=== Selected publications ===
Her publications include:

- Karen L Christman; Andrew J Vardanian; Qizhi Fang; Richard E Sievers; Hubert H Fok; Randall J Lee (2004). "Injectable fibrin scaffold improves cell transplant survival, reduces infarct expansion, and induces neovasculature formation in ischemic myocardium". Journal of the American College of Cardiology. 44 (3): 654–660. doi:10.1016/j.jacc.2004.04.040. PMID 15358036. Wikidata Q45206400.
- Jennifer M Singelyn; Jessica A DeQuach; Sonya B Seif-Naraghi; Robert B Littlefield; Pamela J Schup-Magoffin; Karen L Christman (2009). "Naturally derived myocardial matrix as an injectable scaffold for cardiac tissue engineering". Biomaterials. 30 (29): 5409–5416. doi:10.1016/j.biomaterials.2009.06.045. PMC 2728782. PMID 19608268. Wikidata Q41969553.
- Karen L Christman; Hubert H Fok; Richard E Sievers; Qizhi Fang; Randall J Lee (2004). "Fibrin glue alone and skeletal myoblasts in a fibrin scaffold preserve cardiac function after myocardial infarction". Tissue Engineering. 10 (3–4): 403–409. doi:10.1089/107632704323061762. PMID 15165457. Wikidata Q46599109.
