= Shelly Sakiyama-Elbert =

American biomedical engineer

Shelly E. Sakiyama-Elbert is an American biomedical engineer whose research involves neural stem cell transplantation for neuroregeneration after spinal cord injury. She is a professor of bioengineering at the University of Washington College of Engineering, and vice dean for research and graduate education in the University of Washington School of Medicine.

== Education and career ==
Sakiyama-Elbert is originally from Southern California. She studied chemical engineering and biology as an undergraduate at the Massachusetts Institute of Technology, graduating in 1996. She went to the California Institute of Technology for graduate study in chemical engineering, earning a master's degree in 1998 and completing her Ph.D. in 2000.

As a faculty member at Washington University in St. Louis, Sakiyama-Elbert co-directed the Center for Regenerative Medicine, at the Washington University School of Medicine and became the associate chair for Graduate Studies in the Department of Biomedical Engineering at the McKelvey School of Engineering. She moved to the Cockrell School of Engineering in 2016 as chair of the Department of Biomedical Engineering and Fletcher Stuckey Pratt Chair in Engineering. In 2022, she moved to her present position at the University of Washington, together with her husband, Alzheimer's disease researcher Donald Elbert.

== Recognition ==
Sakiyama-Elbert is a 2011 Fellow of the American Institute for Medical and Biological Engineering, a 2013 Fellow of the Biomedical Engineering Society, a 2015 Fellow of the American Association for the Advancement of Science, a 2016 Fellow of the International Union of Societies of Biomaterials Science and Engineering, and a 2017 Fellow of the National Academy of Inventors.

She is the 2023 recipient of the Senior Scientist Award (Americas) of the Tissue Engineering and Regenerative Medicine International Society.
