= Mark Alan Barteau =

American engineer

- Occupations: Engineer; Vice President for Research; professor
- Employer: Texas A&M University

Mark Alan Barteau is an American engineer.

He was Vice President for Research at Texas A&M University; holder of the Haliburton Chair in Engineering and professor in the Department of Chemical Engineering, College of Engineering; and professor in the Department of Chemistry, College of Science. Prior to joining Texas A&M, he was Director of the University of Michigan Energy Institute, University of Michigan Energy Institute and the DTE Professor of Advanced Energy Research at the University of Michigan.

Barteau was elected a member of the National Academy of Engineering for advancing the fundamental understanding of surface chemical-reaction mechanisms and for the design and invention of new catalysts. He is also an elected fellow of the American Association for the Advancement of Science and the National Academy of Inventors. He also previously served as the Senior Vice Provost for Research and Strategic Initiatives at the University of Delaware, where he held appointments as the Robert L. Pigford Endowed Chair of Chemical Engineering and Professor of Chemistry & Biochemistry. Bartau graduated with a Bachelor's in Chemical Engineering from the School of Engineering (McKelvey School of Engineering) at Washington University in St. Louis in 1976 and has a Master's and PHD in Chemical Engineering from Stanford University.

Barteau received the 1995 Ipatieff Prize from the American Chemical Society.
