= Leyla Soleymani =

Researcher

- Born: Iran
- Awards: 2020 SAE Create the Future Awards Grand Prize.; Dorothy Killam Fellowship in 2025

Academic background
- Education: McGill University, (B.Eng), University of Southern California, (M.Sc.), University of Toronto (Ph.D.).
- Thesis: Ultra-sensitive Detection of Nucleic Acids using an Electronic Chip (2011)
- Doctoral advisor: Ted Sargent

Academic work
- Discipline: Biomedical Engineering
- Institutions: McMaster University
- Website: https://www.eng.mcmaster.ca/engphys/faculty/dr-leyla-soleymani/, https://www.geneticsensing.com/

Leyla Soleymani is a scientist and Canada Research Chair (Tier 1) at McMaster University's faculty of engineering. Her research includes the development of advanced materials for biosensing and repellent surfaces.

== Biography ==
Soleymani received her Ph.D. in Electrical and Computer Engineering from the University of Toronto in 2010 under the mentorship of Ted Sargent. Her dissertation, "Ultrasensitive Detection of Nucleic Acids using an Electronic Chip", won the 2011 Douglas R. Colton Medal for Research Excellence which recognizes excellence in Canadian micro-nano research.

Soleymani was appointed as McMaster's inaugural associate vice president for commercialization and entrepreneurship in 2023. In her role, Soleymani oversees the university's seed fund and entrepreneurship training.

In 2025, Soleymani advocated for greater Canadian investment in life-sciences innovation and manufacturing as a response to US tariffs and changes in the US life sciences sector during the second Trump administration.

== RepelWrap Invention ==
In 2019, Soleymani developed a plastic wrap that repels pathogens such as the superbug methicillin-resistant Staphylococcus aureus from surfaces.

The product was inspired by the water-shedding properties of the leaf of a lotus plant. Is uses a "self-cleaning surface design microscopically “tuned” to shed everything that comes into contact with it, down to the scale of viruses and bacteria."

For this invention, Suleymani, and her coauthor Tohid Didar, took the Grand Prize at the 2020 SAE Media Group Create the Future Awards, beating over 700 entries from over 60 countries. In 2025, FendX Technologies Inc., a Vancouver nanotechnology company, reported that the invention, now known as RepelWrap, was performing well in testing and could repel both MRSA and Pseudomonas aeruginosa.

When describing the uses of the invention, Soleymani said, "This is a line of defence against emerging pathogens, including future threats we haven’t yet seen. This technology closes the door to the surface transfer of pathogens."

== Diabetes Invention ==
In 2026, Soleymani gained attention for the invention, with professor Mahla Poudineh of the University of Waterloo, of a painless glucose monitoring device. Together the researchers have launched a company, Aptec Health, to bring the technology to market.
