= Myer Bloom =

- Born: 7 December 1928; Montreal
- Died: 9 February 2016 (aged 87); Vancouver
- Awards: C.A.P. Gold Medal (1973); Izaak-Walton-Killam Award (1995)
- Scientific career
- Fields: Physics
- Institutions: University of British Columbia

Myer Bloom, FRSC (7 December 1928 – 9 February 2016) was a Canadian physicist, specializing in the theory and applications of Nuclear magnetic resonance.

== Education and career ==
Bloom was born into a Jewish family in Montreal in 1928. After secondary education at Baron Byng High School, Bloom received in 1949 his B.S. and in 1950 his M.S. from McGill University. In 1954 he received his Ph.D. from the University of Illinois at Urbana–Champaign under Charles Slichter with thesis Magnetic Induction in Nuclear Quadrupole Resonance. Bloom was supported by an NRC Travelling Postdoctoral Fellowship at Leiden University from 1954 to 1956. At the University of British Columbia, he was a research associate in 1956–1957, an assistant professor in 1957–1960, an associate professor in 1960–1963, a full professor in 1963–1994, and professor emeritus from 1995 until his death. He was a visiting professor at Harvard University, Kyoto University, the University of Paris Sud, the University of Rome, and the Danish Technical University.

Bloom’s first important work in Leiden was to carry out the very first NMR studies of fluid and solid H_{2} and HD. During that period he also performed seminal work with prof. van Kranendonk showing how nuclear spins relax in antiferromagnetic crystals. After returning to Canada to join UBC, Bloom set up a research program to study molecular solids, and he and his group managed to measure relaxation times over a broad temperature range, putting them in a position, via a theoretical analysis, to obtain information about molecular interaction potentials. They also for the first time achieved a measurement of the transitions between ortho, para, and meta nuclear spin symmetries in solid methane. Further pioneering studies involved studies of relaxation in a pure ^{3}He gas in two and three dimensions.

With Karl Erdman, Bloom collaborated on the transverse Stern–Gerlach experiment.

Myer Bloom embarked on a new research area inspired by his early work as a student with Erwin Hahn on pulsed magnetic induction in nuclear quadrupolar resonance and the then-new spin-echo techniques. Bloom realized that this provided the foundation for a novel approach to solid-state NMR studies of biological systems in which protons could be substituted by deuterons. Using these techniques Bloom, in collaboration with Ian Smith, managed to obtain the very first deuterium NMR spectrum of a biological membrane. This is possibly Myer Bloom’s most important and influential scientific contribution since it could be applied in a range of fields. The technique allowed recording of an essentially undistorted Fourier transform ^{2}H spectrum, and research groups around the world within membrane biophysics and biochemistry have since used the technique routinely.

He is very well known internationally for his fundamental contributions to Nuclear Magnetic Resonance Physics, and to the applications of NMR to probe the structure and dynamics of biological membranes. Some of his best-known contributions were in defining the proton and deuteron NMR lineshapes from hydrogen nuclei in lipid hydrocarbon chains in both large multilamellar preparations and in smaller lipid vesicles, as well as in the presence of membrane proteins. He created the ‘dePakeing’ technique, which enables the extraction of single orientation deuteron NMR spectra from powder pattern spectra obtained from lipid hydrocarbon chains.

== Legacy ==
He had a wife Margaret Patricia Bloom (née Holmes), a son David Bloom, and a daughter Margot Bloom. He published in 2014 a book of personal recollections Lucky Hazards: My Life in Physics.

== Awards and honours ==
- Sloan Fellow (1961–1965)
- Fellow of the American Physical Society (elected 1962)
- Guggenheim Fellow (1964–1965)
- Steacie Prize (1967)
- Fellow of the Royal Society of Canada (elected 1968)
- Jacob Biely Faculty Research Prize of UBC (1969)
- Canadian Association of Physicists Medal for Lifetime Achievement in Physics (1973)
- Izaak Walton Killam Memorial Prize for Natural Sciences (1995)

== See also ==
- Pake doublet
