= Milica Radisic =

Serbian Canadian tissue engineer

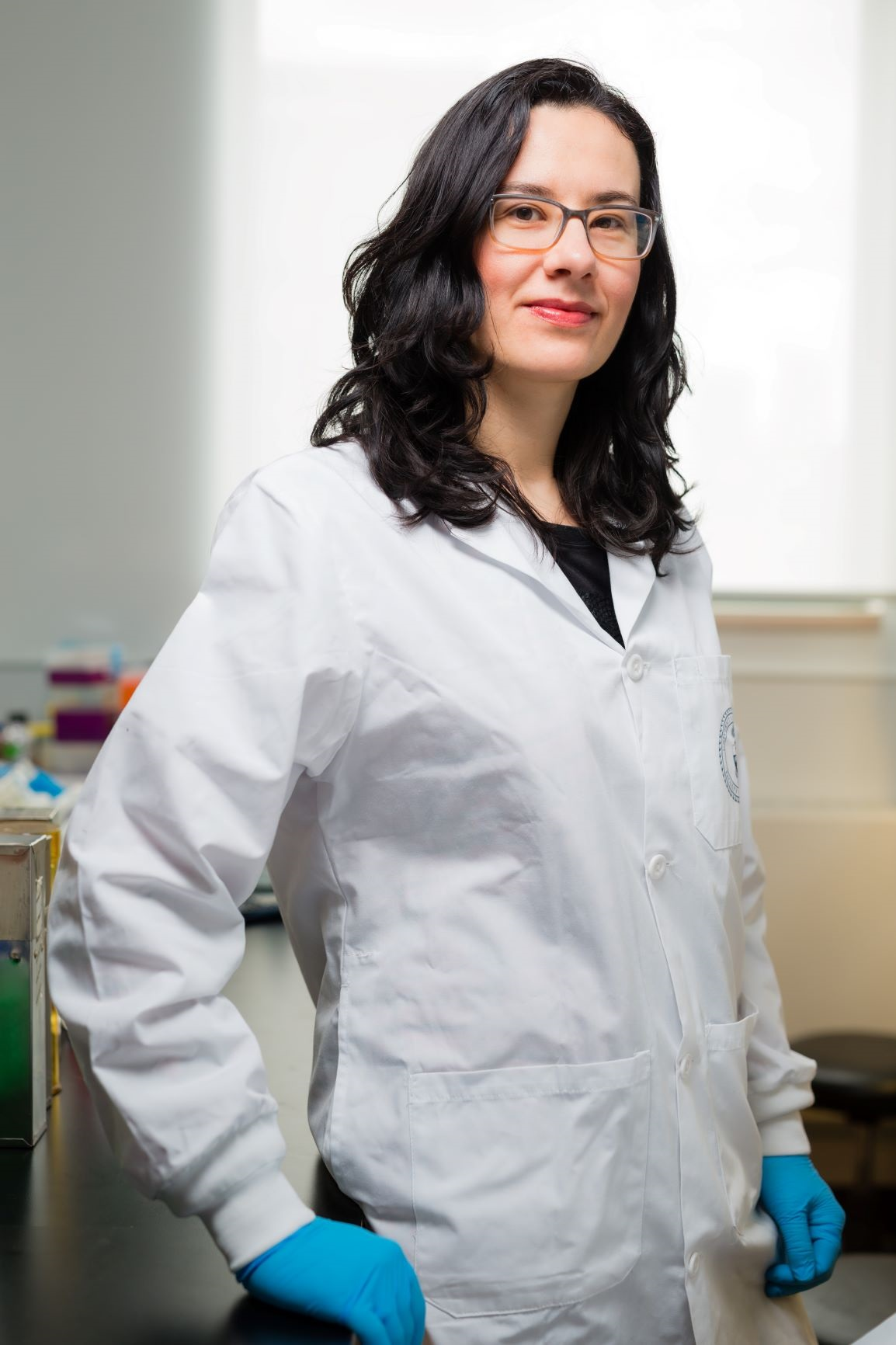
- Radisic in 2016
- Born: Milica Rodić; 1976 (age 49–50); Bačka Palanka, SR Serbia, SFR Yugoslavia
- Occupations: Tissue engineer, academic and researcher
- Title: Canada Research Chair in Functional Cardiovascular Tissue Engineering
- Awards: Queen Elizabeth II Diamond Jubilee Medal; Fellow, Royal Society of Canada; Fellow, Academy of Sciences; Fellow, Canadian Academy of Engineering; Fellow, American Institute for Medical and Biological Engineering

Academic background
- Education: B.Eng., chemical engineering Ph.D., chemical engineering
- Alma mater: McMaster University; Massachusetts Institute of Technology
- Thesis: Biomimetic Approach to Cardiac Tissue Engineering

Academic work
- Institutions: University of Toronto

Milica Radisic (Serbian: Милица Радишић/Milica Radišić; born 1976) is a Serbian Canadian tissue engineer, academic and researcher. She is a professor at the University of Toronto's Institute of Biomaterials and Biomedical Engineering, and the Department of Chemical Engineering and Applied Chemistry. She co-founded two biotech companies, TARA Biosystems and Quthero. She is a senior scientist at the Toronto General Hospital Research Institute.

Radisic is known for creating beating heart tissue in a dish using human-induced pluripotent stem cells. Her research has led the replication of diseased human heart tissue that can be used for drug screening to help create treatment therapies for patients with heart injury.

Radisic was recognized as a YWCA Toronto Woman of Distinction in 2018, and received the Women in Science and Engineering Breaking the Glass Ceiling Award. She is a Former Chair of the Membership Committee for the Tissue Engineering and Regenerative Medicine International Society. Radisic is a Fellow of the Royal Society of Canada, Academy of Sciences, Canadian Academy of Engineering, American Institute for Medical and Biological Engineering as well as Tissue Engineering and Regenerative Medicine Society.

== Education ==
Radisic attended the University of Novi Sad for her freshman year and transferred to McMaster University in 1996. She graduated with a bachelor's degree in chemical engineering in 1999 and earned her Ph.D. in chemical engineering from Massachusetts Institute of Technology in 2004. She then completed a postdoctoral fellowship at Harvard-MIT Division of Health Sciences and Technology in 2005.

== Career ==
Radisic started her career as a research assistant at McMaster University and MIT before working as a postdoctoral associate at Harvard-MIT Division of Health Science and Technology. In 2005, Radisic joined Institute of Biomaterials and Biomedical Engineering at the University of Toronto as an assistant professor at the Department of Chemical Engineering and Applied Chemistry. She was promoted to associate professor in 2010 and to professor, in 2014.

Radisic co-founded two biotechnology companies. TARA Biosystems, based in New York City, was founded in 2014 and develops engineered human tissues used to test drug safety and effectiveness. Quthero, based in Miami, Florida, was founded in 2017 and focuses on regenerative wound-healing therapies for applications in dermatology and cardiology.

== Research ==
Radisic's general research focuses on treatments for myocardial infarction and drug cardio-toxicity screening. Her work centers on using human embryonic and induced pluripotent stem cells to develop a heart patch that could be used to study the safety and efficacy of new drugs as well as its compatibility with various cell lines. Radisic was the first author of a highly cited paper in PNAS where she successfully generated beating heart tissues from embryonic stem cells via electrical stimulation.

=== Tissue engineering of cardiac patches ===
Radisic has worked on designing advanced bioreactors for cardiac tissue engineering capable of integrating mechanical and electrical stimuli with perfusion. She has also conducted research on developing strategies to engineer vascularized myocardium based on the tri-culture of key heart cell types using the engineered cardiac tissue as a model system for cardiac cell therapy or drug testing.

=== Organ-on-a-chip engineering ===
Radisic's lab works on the development of injectable hydrogels with specific peptides such as QHREDGS peptide–modified hydrogel. She also researched on the biometric cues in vitro and developed an engineered oriented cardiac tissue. Radisic has also worked on other biomaterials such as moldable elastomeric polyester-carbon nanotube scaffolds for cardiac tissue engineering that will promote survival and localization of the cardio-myocytes injected into the infarcted myocardium.

Radisic developed a flexible shape-memory scaffold for minimally invasive delivery of functional tissues. The scaffold utilizes a biodegradable polymer and a micro-fabricated lattice design to allow its shape memory property. Her lab designed micro-fabricated cell culture systems with built-in electrodes and defined groove and ridge heights for simultaneous application of field stimulation and contact guidance cues, in order to understand interactive effects of multiple physical stimuli.

Radisic and her team developed a microfabricated system for generating 3D, aligned beating cardiac tissue (Bio-wire) from human pluripotent stem cells (hPSC) derived cardiomyocytes. The system utilized electrical stimulation to increase the maturation of hPSC derived cardiomyocytes. Bio-wire is the first system combining electrical stimulation with geometry control of 3D tissue assembly to improve the electrical and ultra-structural properties of human cardiac tissue.

== Awards and honors ==
- 1998 – The Chancellor's Gold Medal, McMaster University
- 1999 – Merit Award, Canadian Society of Chemical Industries
- 2009 – Breaking the Glass Ceiling Award, Women in Science and Engineering (WISE), University of Toronto.
- 2010 – McMaster University Arch Award for work in Bioengineering, McMaster University
- 2011 – Connaught Innovation Award, University of Toronto
- 2012 – Young Engineer Achievement Award, Engineers Canada
- 2012 – McLean Award, University of Toronto
- 2013 – Queen Elizabeth II Diamond Jubilee Medal
- 2013 – Inventor of the Year Award, University of Toronto
- 2014 – E.W.R Steacie Memorial Fellowship, Natural Sciences and Engineering Research Council
- 2015 – Hatch Innovation Award, Canadian Society of Chemical Engineers
- 2017 – Dr. E. R. Smith Lectureship in Cardiovascular Research Award, Libin Cardiovascular Institute, University of Calgary
- 2017 – Steacie Prize
- 2018 – Frost & Sullivan's Technology Innovation Award
- 2018 – YWCA Toronto Women of Distinction Award, Honouring Women in Canada
- 2019 – Engineering Medal for Research and Development, Ontario Professional Engineers
- 2021 – Safwat Zakay Research Leader Award, Faculty of Applied Science and Engineering, University of Toronto
- 2022 – Acta Biomaterialia Silver Award

== Bibliography ==
=== Book ===
• Cardiac Tissue Engineering Methods and Protocols (2014) ISBN 978-1493910465

=== Selected articles ===
- Radisic, M., Park, H., Shing, H., Consi, T., Schoen, F.J., Langer, R., Freed, L.E. and Vunjak-Novakovic, G., 2004. Functional assembly of engineered myocardium by electrical stimulation of cardiac myocytes cultured on scaffolds. Proceedings of the National Academy of Sciences, 101(52), pp. 18129–18134.
- Radisic, M., Park, H., Chen, F., Salazar-Lazzaro, J.E., Wang, Y., Dennis, R., Langer, R., Freed, L.E. and Vunjak-Novakovic, G., 2006. Biomimetic approach to cardiac tissue engineering: oxygen carriers and channeled scaffolds. Tissue Engineering, 12(8), pp. 2077–2091.
- Shen, Y.H., Shoichet, M.S. and Radisic, M., 2008. Vascular endothelial growth factor immobilized in collagen scaffold promotes penetration and proliferation of endothelial cells. Acta Biomaterialia, 4(3), pp. 477–489.
- Miyagi, Y., Chiu, L.L., Cimini, M., Weisel, R.D., Radisic, M. and Li, R.K., 2011. Biodegradable collagen patch with covalently immobilized VEGF for myocardial repair. Biomaterials, 32(5), pp. 1280–1290.
- Thavandiran, N., Dubois, N., Mikryukov, A., Massé, S., Beca, B., Simmons, C.A., Deshpande, V.S., McGarry, J.P., Chen, C.S., Nanthakumar, K. and Keller, G.M., 2013. Design and formulation of functional pluripotent stem cell-derived cardiac microtissues. Proceedings of the National Academy of Sciences, 110(49), pp.E4698-E4707.
- Biowire: a platform for maturation of human pluripotent stem cell–derived cardiomyocytes SS Nunes, JW Miklas, J Liu, R Aschar-Sobbi, Y Xiao, B Zhang, J Jiang, ... Nature Methods 10 (8), 781–787
- A platform for generation of chamber-specific cardiac tissues and disease modeling Y Zhao, N Rafatian, NT Feric, BJ Cox, R Aschar-Sobbi, EY Wang, ... Cell 176 (4), 913–927. e18
- Flexible shape-memory scaffold for minimally invasive delivery of functional tissues M Montgomery, S Ahadian, LD Huyer, ML Rito, RA Civitarese, ... Nature Materials 16 (10), 1038–1046
- Biodegradable scaffold with built-in vasculature for organ-on-a-chip engineering and direct surgical anastomosis B Zhang, M Montgomery, MD Chamberlain, S Ogawa, A Korolj, A Pahnke, ... Nature Materials 15 (6), 669–678
- Admin. (2025, August 14). People - Radisic Lab. Radisic Lab.
- Glowacki, P. (2025, October 14). From Lab Bench to Beating Hearts: Dr. Milica Radisic on the Future of Organ-on-a-Chip Technology. The Chemical Institute of Canada.
