= Jules Carbotte =

Canadian physicist (1938–2019)

Jules P. Carbotte
- Born: 1938-03-26; Long Beach, CA
- Died: 2019-04-05
- Education: University of Manitoba, McGill University
- Known for: Condensed matter physics
- Awards: CAP Herzberg Medal (1974), Steacie Prize (1975)
- Scientific career
- Workplaces: Cornell University, McMaster University
- Thesis: Positron annihilation in metals
- Doctoral advisor: S. Kahana

Jules P. Carbotte (March 26, 1938 – April 5, 2019) was a Canadian physicist, professor at McMaster University and a Fellow of the Royal Society of Canada. His research interests spanned many areas of theoretical condensed matter physics.

== Early life and education ==
Carbotte was born in Long Beach, California, on March 26, 1938, when his parents, Leon and Pauline Carbotte, were visiting California on an extended winter holiday from their home in Saskatchewan. He grew up in a French-speaking community in Manitoba and attended the Université de Saint-Boniface

Carbotte received a Bachelor of Science degree with honors in physics in 1960 from the University of Manitoba. He received a Masters of Science degree in physics in 1961 and PhD in physics from McGill University in 1963. His PhD research in condensed matter physics focused on refinements to theoretical models of positron annihilation in metals.

== Career ==
After finishing his PhD, spent two years as a research associate in the Physics Department of Cornell University. In 1965 he returned to Canada and became an assistant professor in the department of Physics at McMaster University. In 1967, he took a position at McGill University then returned to McMaster in 1968 where he stayed for the rest of his career. He became an associate professor in 1972 and a university professor at McMaster in 1996.

In 1988, Carbotte became the founding director of the superconductivity program of the Canadian Institute for Advanced Research. He retired in 1998.

Over his career, Carbotte contributed to many different areas of condensed matter theory. His work includes theoretical calculations of positron annihilation and electron-phonon interaction in metals. He has also contributed to the theoretical understanding of dilute metallic alloys, where a small amount of one metallic element is dissolved in another metallic element. He has also worked to understand the microscopic origins of superconductivity, especially in high-temperature superconducting oxides.

== Awards and Recognitions ==
- 1974 CAP Herzberg Medal
- 1974 Fellow of the Royal Society of Canada
- 1975 Steacie Prize
- 1979 CAP Gold Medal
- 1981 Metal Physics Medal
- 1987 Fellow of the Canadian Institute for Advanced Research
- 1996 University Distinguished Professor, McMaster University
- 1994 Honorary DSc, University of Waterloo
- 1999 Honorary DSc, University of Manitoba
- 2000 Honorary DSc, Université de Sherbrooke
- 2010 Honorary DSc, McMaster University

== Selected publications ==
- Carbotte, J. P. (1990-10-01). "Properties of boson-exchange superconductors". Reviews of Modern Physics. 62 (4): 1027–1157. Bibcode:1990RvMP...62.1027C. doi:10.1103/RevModPhys.62.1027.
- Prohammer, M.; Perez-Gonzalez, A.; Carbotte, J. P. (1993-06-01). "Thermodynamics of a retarded d-wave superconductor with resonant impurity scattering". Physical Review B. 47 (22): 15152–15158. Bibcode:1993PhRvB..4715152P. doi:10.1103/PhysRevB.47.15152. PMID 10005888.

== Personal life ==
Carbotte married Ramona DePauw in 1959 and remained together until his death 59 years later. The couple met during a first year summer school class in physics while they were both undergraduates at the University of Manitoba. They had two daughters Christine and Suzanne.
