= Tissue Engineering and Regenerative Medicine International Society =

- Abbreviation: TERMIS
- Formation: 2005
- Type: INGO 501(c)(3)
- Purpose: medical research
- Region served: worldwide
- Official language: english
- President: Anthony S. Weiss
- Website: https://termis.org/

Tissue Engineering and Regenerative Medicine International Society is an international learned society dedicated to tissue engineering and regenerative medicine.

== History ==
Tissue engineering emerged during the 1990s as a potentially powerful option for regenerating tissue, and research initiatives were established in various cities in the United States and in European countries, including the United Kingdom, Italy, Germany, and Switzerland, as well as in Japan. Soon, fledgling societies were formed in these countries in order to represent these new sciences, notably the European Tissue Engineering Society (ETES) and, in the United States, the Tissue Engineering Society (TES), later renamed the Tissue Engineering Society International (TESI), and the Regenerative Medicine Society (RMS).

== Structure and governance ==
It was determined that each Chapter would have its own Council, the overall activities being determined by the Governing Board, on which each Council was represented, and an executive committee.

=== Society chapters ===
At the beginning of the Society, it was agreed that there would be Continental Chapters of TERMIS, initially TERMIS-North America (TERMIS-NA) and TERMIS-Europe (TERMIS-EU), to be joined at the time of the major Shanghai conference in October 2005 by TERMIS-Asia Pacific (TERMIS-AP). It was subsequently agreed that the remit of TERMIS-North America should be expanded to incorporate activity in South America, the chapter becoming TERMIS-Americas (TERMS-AM) officially in 2012.

=== Student and Young Investigator Section ===
The Student and Young Investigator Section of TERMIS (TERMIS-SYIS) brings together undergraduate and graduate students, post-doctoral researchers and young investigators in industry and academia related to tissue engineering and regenerative medicine. It follows the organizational and working pattern of TERMIS.

== Activities ==
=== Journal ===
Tissue Engineering
- Language: English

Publication details
- Publisher: Mary Ann Liebert on behalf of the Tissue Engineering and Regenerative Medicine International Society

Standard abbreviations
- ISO 4: Tissue Eng.

Indexing
- Tissue Engineering
- ISSN: 1076-3279 (print); 1557-8690 (web)
- Tissue Engineering Part A
- ISSN: 1937-3341 (print); 1937-335X (web)
- Tissue Engineering Part B: Reviews
- ISSN: 1937-3368 (print); 1937-3376 (web)
- Tissue Engineering Part C: Methods
- ISSN: 1937-3384 (print); 1937-3392 (web)

Links
- Journal homepage

A contract was signed between TERMIS and the Mary Ann Liebert publisher which designated the journal Tissue Engineering, Parts A, B, and C as the official journal of TERMIS with free on-line access for the membership.

=== Conferences ===
It was agreed that there would be a World Congress every three years, with each Chapter organizing its own conference in the intervening two years.

=== Awards ===
Each TERMIS chapter has defined awards to recognize outstanding scientists and their contributions within the community.

==== TERMIS-AP ====
- The Excellence Achievement Award has been established to recognize a researcher in the Asia-Pacific region who has made continuous and landmark contributions to the tissue engineering and regenerative medicine field.
- The Outstanding Scientist Award has been established to recognize a mid-career researcher in the Asia-Pacific region who has made significant contributions to the TERM field.
- The Young Scholar Award has been established to recognize a young researcher in the Asia-Pacific region who has made significant and consistent achievements in the TERM field, showing clear evidence of their potential to excel.
- The Mary Ann Liebert, Inc. Best TERM Paper Award has been established to recognize a student researcher (undergraduate/graduate/postdoc) in the Asia-Pacific region who has achieved outstanding research accomplishments in the TERM field.
- The TERMIS-AP Innovation Team Award has been established to recognize a team of researchers in the Asia-Pacific region. It aims to recognize successful applications of tissue engineering and regenerative medicine leading to the development of relevant products/therapies/technologies which will ultimately benefit the patients.

==== TERMIS-EU ====
- The Career Achievement Award is aimed towards a recognition of individuals who have made outstanding contributions to the field of TERM and have carried out most of their career in the TERMIS-EU geographical area.
- The Mid Terms Career Award has been established in 2020 to recognize individuals that are within 10–20 years after obtaining their PhD, with a successful research group and clear evidence of outstanding performance.
- The Robert Brown Early Career Principal Investigator Award recognizes individuals that are within 2–10 years after obtaining their PhD, with clear evidence of a growing profile.

==== Award recipients ====
TERMIS-AP
2016	Hai Bang Lee – Excellence Achievement Award; Hsing-Wen Sung – Outstanding Scientist Award
2017	Yilin Cao – Excellence Achievement Award; Wei Liu – Outstanding Scientist Award
2018	Teruo Okano - Excellence Achievement Award; Yasuhiko Tabata - Outstanding Scientist Award
2021	Akon Higuchi - Outstanding Scientist Award; Yinghong Zhu - Young Investigator Award; Iman Roohani - Young Investigator Award
2022	Yasuhiko Tabata - Excellence Achievement Award; Yin Xiao - Outstanding Scientist Award; Jiao Jiao Li - Young Investigator Award; Khoon Lim - Young Investigator Award
2023	Guoping Chen - Outstanding Scientist Award; Zengping Liu - Young Investigator Award; Mark Colin Allenby - Young Investigator Award
2024	Gang Li - Outstanding Scientist Award; Akon Higuchi - Excellence Achievement Award; Sharun Khan - Young Investigator Award

TERMIS-EU
2013	Clemens van Blitterswijk – Career Achievement Award; Ranieri Cancedda – Contributions to the Literature Award; Manuela Gomes – Young Scientist Award
2014	C. James Kirkpatrick – Career Achievement Award; Katja Schenke-Layland – Young Scientist Award
2016	James B. Richardson – Clinical Translation Award; Lorenzo Moroni – Young Scientist Award
2017	Rui L. Reis – Contributions to the Literature Award; Jeroen Rouwkema – Robert Brown Early Career Principal Investigator Award
2019	David F. Williams – Chairs’ Life Achievement & Contribution Award; Rui L. Reis – Career Achievement Award; Liesbet Geris – Robert Brown Early Career Principal Investigator Award
2020	Graziella Pellegrini – Career Achievement Award; Martin J. Stoddart - Mid Term Career Award; Jeroen Leijten – Robert Brown Early Career Principal Investigator Award
2021	Marietta Hermann - Robert Brown Early Career Principal Investigator Award; Jos Malda - Mid Term Career Award; Ranieri Cancedda - Career Achievement Award
2022	Riccardo Levato - Robert Brown Early Principal Investigator Award; Marianna Tryfonidou - Mid Term Career Award; Alicia El Haj - Career Achievement Award
2023	Michael Monaghan - Robert Brown Early Principal Investigator Award; Danny Kelly - Mid Term Career Award; Mauro Alini - Career Achievement Award
2024	Miguel Castilho - Robert Brown Early Principal Investigator Award; Lorenzo Moroni - Mid-Term Career Award

TERMIS-AM
2010	Arnold I. Caplan – Lifetime Achievement Award; Ali Khademhosseini – Young Investigator Award; James Kretlow – Mary Ann Liebert, Inc. Outstanding Student Award
2011	Robert S. Langer – Lifetime Achievement Award; David J. Mooney – Senior Scientist Award; F. Kurtis Kasper – Young Investigator Award; Jessica A. DeQuach – Mary Ann Liebert, Inc. Outstanding Student Award
2012	Alan J. Russell – Lifetime Achievement Award; Stephen F. Badylak – Senior Scientist Award; Karen L. Christman – Young Investigator Award; Kacey G. Marra – Educational Award; Brian M. Sicari – Mary Ann Liebert, Inc. Outstanding Student Award; Andrew J. Marshall – Innovation/Commercialization Award
2013	Robert M. Nerem – Lifetime Achievement Award; William R. Wagner – Senior Scientist Award; Alison P. McGuigan – Young Investigator Award; Rameshwar R. Rao – Mary Ann Liebert, Inc. Outstanding Student Award
2014	Anthony Atala – Lifetime Achievement Award; Molly Shoichet – Senior Scientist Award; Warren Grayson – Young Investigator Award; Bryan Brown – Educational Award; Laura Bracaglia – Mary Ann Liebert, Inc. Outstanding Student Award
2015	Antonios G. Mikos – Lifetime Achievement Award; Robert T. Tranquillo – Senior Scientist Award; Eric M. Brey – Educational Award; Lauren D. Black III – Young Investigator Award; Timothy J. Keane Jr. – Mary Ann Liebert, Inc. Outstanding Student Award
2016	Michael Sefton – Lifetime Achievement Award; Ali Khademhosseini – Senior Scientist Award; Johnna Temenoff – Educational Award; Jordan Green – Young Investigator Award; Jenna Dziki – Mary Ann Liebert, Inc. Outstanding Student Award
2017	Joseph P. Vacanti – Lifetime Achievement Award; John P. Fisher – Senior Scientist Award; Lauren Black – Educational Award; Ngan F. Huang – Young Investigator Award; Mahesh Devarasetty – Mary Ann Liebert, Inc. Outstanding Student Award
2018	Karen Christman - Senior Scientist Award; Kurt Kasper - Educational Award; Yu Shrike Zhang - Young Investigator Award; Andreas Kaasi - Innovation/Commercialization Award; Catalina Molina Pineda - Mary Ann Liebert, Inc. Outstanding Student Award
2020	Stephen George - Senior Scientist Award; Ashley Brown - Young Investigator Award; Sarah Rowlinson - Educational Award; Jiapu Liang - Mary Ann Liebert, Inc., Outstanding Student Award
2021	Gordana Vunjak-Novakovic - Lifetime Achievement Award; Jennifer Elisseeff - Senior Scientist Award; Christine Schmidt - Commercialization/Innovation Award; Madeline Cramer - Mary Ann Liebert, Inc. Outstanding Student Award
2022	Laura Niklason - Lifetime Achievement Award; Eben Alsberg - Senior Scientist Award; Patricia Pranke - Educational, Training and Outreach Award; Fatima Syed-Picard - Young Investigator Award; Jakob Townsend - Outstanding Postdoc Award; Guillermo Ameer - Commercialization and Innovation Award; Courney Johnson - Mary Ann Liebert, Inc. Outstanding Student Award
2023	Kyricos Athanasiou - Lifetime Achievement Award; Shelly Sakiyama-Elbert - Senior Scientist Award; Joan Schanck - Educational, Training and Outreach Award
2024	Kyricos Athanasiou - Lifetime Achievement Award; Alison McGuigan - Senior Scientist Award; Catherine K. Kuo - Educational, Training and Outreach Award

== Fellows ==
Fellows of Tissue Engineering and Regenerative Medicine (FTERM) recipients are:

- Alini, Mauro
- Alsberg, Eben
- Atala, Anthony
- Badylak, Stephen
- Cancedda, Ranieri
- Cao, Yilin
- Chatzinikolaidou, Maria
- El Haj, Alicia
- Fontanilla, Marta
- Germain, Lucie
- Gomes, Manuela
- Griffith, Linda
- Guldberg, Robert
- Hellman, Kiki
- Hilborn, Jöns
- Hubbell, Jeffrey
- Hutmacher, Dietmar
- Khang, Gilson
- Kirkpatrick, C. James
- Langer, Robert
- Lee, Hai-Bang
- Lee, Jin Ho
- Lewandowska-Szumiel, Malgorzata
- Marra, Kacey
- Martin, Ivan
- McGuigan, Alison
- Mikos, Antonios
- Mooney, David
- Motta, Antonella
- Naughton, Gail
- Okano, Teruo
- Pandit, Abhay
- Parenteau, Nancy
- Radisic, Milica
- Ratner, Buddy
- Redl, Heinz
- Reis, Rui L.
- Richards, R. Geoff
- Russell, Alan
- Schenke-Layland, Katja
- Shoichet, Molly
- Smith, David
- Tabata, Yasuhiko
- Tuan, Rocky
- Vacanti, Charles
- Vacanti, Joseph
- van Osch, Gerjo
- Vunjak-Novakovic, Gordana
- Wagner, William
- Weiss, Anthony S.

Emeritus

- Johnson, Peter
- Williams, David

Deceased Fellows

- Nerem, Robert

== See also ==
- Tissue engineering
- Regenerative medicine
