= Heather Maynard =

American chemist

Heather D. Maynard
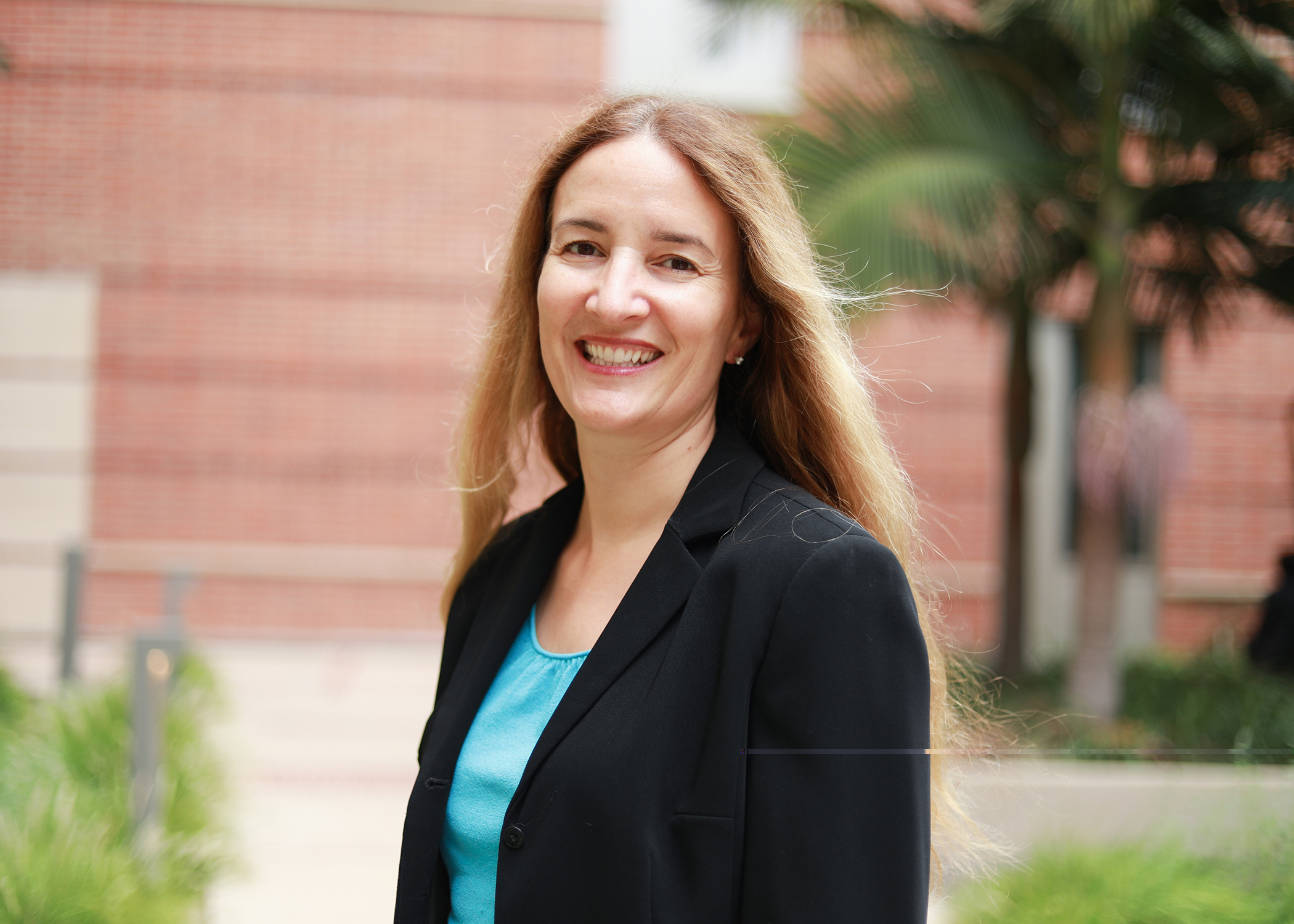
- Education: University of North Carolina at Chapel Hill; University of California, Santa Barbara; California Institute of Technology
- Known for: Protein-polymer conjugates
- Scientific career
- Workplaces: ETH Zurich; University of California, Los Angeles

Heather D. Maynard is the Dr Myung Ki Hong Professor in Polymer Science at the University of California, Los Angeles. She works on protein-polymer conjugates and polymeric drugs. Maynard is an elected member of the National Academy of Sciences and American Academy of Arts and Sciences. Maynard is also a Fellow of the Royal Society of Chemistry, the American Association for the Advancement of Science, and American Institute for Medical and Biological Engineering. Maynard is a 2026 Guggenheim Fellow.

== Early life and education ==
Maynard became interested in chemistry during junior high. At the age of 12, she decided she wanted to become a professor of chemistry. She studied chemistry at the University of North Carolina at Chapel Hill. She earned her bachelor's degree with honours at the University of North Carolina at Chapel Hill. She moved to the University of California, Santa Barbara for her master's studies in materials science. After earning her master's degree in 1995, Maynard joined the California Institute of Technology, where she worked in the research group of Robert H. Grubbs. She moved to ETH Zurich as an American Chemical Society Fellow with Jeffrey Hubbell.

== Research and career ==
In 2002 Maynard joined the faculty at the University of California, Los Angeles (UCLA). She started her career at the UCLA as the first Howard Reiss Career Development Chair. In 2005 she took part in a National Academy of Engineering Frontiers of Engineering symposium that shared technical research between the United States and Japan. She was promoted to full professor at UCLA in 2012. Her research considers polymer materials, including arrays, films for patterning, bioactive proteins and new ways to develop protein-polymer conjugates. These conjugates are used in medical therapeutics to treat a range of diseases, and are synthesised by polymerising from proteins and amino acid-reactive initiators. Maynard has considered the mechanisms that underpin the function of known therapeutics. This includes the development of new synthetic pathways, such as controlled radical polymerization and click chemistry, to make polymers with narrow molecular weight distributions and anchoring sites for particular surfaces. Using controlled radical polymerization. Maynard has shown it is possible to use the fluorous content of poly(ethylene glycol methyl ether methacrylate), fluorous methacrylate and ketene acetal 5,6-benzo-2-methylene-1,3-dioxepane co-polymers to determine whether self assembly results into single or multi-chain nanoparticles. The fluorous content controls the degradation of nanoparticles; high fluorous content results in smaller degradation rate constants.

Maynard integrates polymeric materials with biologically derived molecules. She has designed nanogels and polymers to stabilise biomolecules to temperature variations and agitation. She has also investigated trehalose glycopolymers that contain pendant pyridyl disulfide groups. If polymers only contain side-chain trehalose, they can stabilise a granulocyte colony-stimulating factor and degrade via hydrolysis. If they containpyridyl disulfide groups they can be cross-linked into nanoparticles using peptide glucagon, made bioactive in vitro, neutral to pH and protected from making aggregates. She developed a range of polyethylene glycol nanoparticles that can be cross-linked using hydrazone and oximes. The choice of crosslinking agent determines the degradation of the hydrogels and nanoparticles. These systems can be modified to incorporate chemicals for agricultural applications that require controlled delivery.

In 2016 she was selected as a Fulbright Foundation New Zealand scholar, where she worked on biohybrid polymer materials at the University of Auckland.

=== Awards and honours ===
Her awards and honours include;

- 2006 Alfred P. Sloan Foundation Fellow
- 2007 Selected as an Outstanding Emerging Investigator by the Journal of Materials Chemistry A
- 2007 Hanson-Dow Award for Excellence in Teaching
- 2008 University of Kansas Walter F. Enz Lecturer
- 2008 American Chemical Society New Orleans Young Academic Investigators Symposium Lecturer
- 2011 Fellow of the Royal Society of Chemistry
- 2017 Fellow of the American Chemical Society Division of Polymeric Materials: Science and Engineering
- 2018 Fellow of the American Association for the Advancement of Science
- 2019 American Chemical Society Bioconjugate Chemistry Lectureship Award

=== Selected publications ===
Her publications include;

Maynard, Heather D. (2011). "FDA-approved poly (ethylene glycol)–protein conjugate drugs". Polymer Chemistry. 2 (7): 1442–1448. doi:10.1039/c1py00034a.

Maynard, Heather D. (2005). "In Situ Preparation of Protein−"Smart" Polymer Conjugates with Retention of Bioactivity". Journal of the American Chemical Society. 127 (48): 16955–16960. Bibcode:2005JAChS.12716955H. doi:10.1021/ja054482w. PMID 16316241. S2CID 6611661.

Maynard, Heather D. (2014). "Therapeutic Protein–Polymer Conjugates: Advancing Beyond PEGylation". Journal of the American Chemical Society. 136 (41): 14323–14332. Bibcode:2014JAChS.13614323P. doi:10.1021/ja504390x. PMID 25216406.

She is an editor of the journals Chemical Science, Polymer Chemistry and Bioconjugate Chemistry.
