= Donald L. Katz =

American chemist and chemical engineer

Donald Laverne Katz (August 1, 1907 – May 29, 1989) was an American academic, chemist, and chemical engineer. He was the chairman of the Chemical Engineering Department and A. H. White University professor at the University of Michigan. He was an expert in oil reservoir engineering.

== Early life ==
Katz was born near Jackson, Michigan on August 1, 1907. He received a B.S.E in 1931, a M.S. in 1932, and a Ph.D. in 1933; all in chemical engineering from University of Michigan. He was a member of Tau Beta Pi and Pi Kappa Phi.

== Career ==
Katz worked as a research engineer for the Phillips Petroleum Company in Bartlesville, Oklahoma from 1933 to 1936.

Katz joined the faculty of the University of Michigan in 1936 as an assistant professor, becoming an associate professor in 1943 and a professor in 1944. He was chairman of the Chemical Engineering Department from 1951 to 1962 and A. H. White University Professor from 1964 to 1977. He worked with 55 doctoral students.

Katz was noted for developing a hazard rating system for dangerous bulk cargoes. He was an expert on oil reservoir engineering. In 1959, he started two national studies on using computers in engineering, which were funded by the National Science Foundation and the Ford Foundation. He retired as professor emeritus in 1977.

Katz wrote nine books, including The Handbook of Natural Gas Engineering which was co-authored by former students and published in 1959. He authored 294 publications, most focused on petroleum.

Katz was a visiting professor at the National School of Chemistry in Rio de Janeiro, Brazil in 1963. He was the president of the American Institute of Chemical Engineers in 1959 and became a member of the National Academy of Engineering in 1968. He was an honorary member of Phi Lambda Upsilon, a distinguished member of the Society of Petroleum Engineers, and an honor member of the American Institute of Mining Engineers.

Ronald Reagan presented 1983 National Medal of Science to Katz "for solving many practical engineering problems by delving into a wide group of sciences and making their synergistic effects evident." He was also a member of the National Academy of Engineering.

== Notable awards and honors ==
Katz received the following distinctions and honors:

- 1950 Hanlon Award, Gas Processors Association
- 1959 Michigan Engineer of the Year, Society of Petroleum Engineers
- 1964 John Franklin Carll Award, Society of Petroleum Engineers
- 1964 Distinguished Faculty Achievement Award, University of Michigan
- 1964 Founders Award, American Institute of Chemical Engineers
- 1967 Warren K. Lewis Award, American Institute of Chemical Engineers
- 1968 William H. Walker Award, American Institute of Chemical Engineers
- 1970 Mineral Industries Award, American Institute of Mining Engineers
- 1972 Distinguished Public Service Award, U.S. Coast Guard
- 1975 E. V. Murphree Award, American Chemical Society
- 1977 Gas Industry Research Award, American Gas Association
- 1978 Lucas Gold Medal, American Institute of Mining Engineers
- 1979 Award of Merit, Michigan Historical Society
- 1983 Eminent Chemical Engineer, American Institute of Chemical Engineers
- 1983 National Medal of Science

== Personal life ==
Katz was born on August 1, 2007 to Gottlieb Katz and Lucy Schnackenberg. He married Lila Maxine Crull on September 17, 1932 and they had two children: Marvin LaVerne Katz (born 1935) and Linda Maxine Katz (born 1938). Lila Maxine died on March 6, 1965 from cancer. Katz remarried Elizabeth Harwood Correll on November 26, 1965 who had three children from a prior marriage: Richard Correll, Steven Corell, and Jonathan Correll.

Katz served on the Ann Arbor Board of Education from 1948 to 1957 and was president of the Ann Arbor Council of Churches from 1944 to 1945.

Katz died at his home in Ann Arbor, Michigan on May 29, 1989.
