= Journal of Chemical & Engineering Data =

- Discipline: Physics, Chemical Engineering
- Language: English
- Edited by: J. Ilja Siepmann

Publication details
- History: 1956 to present
- Publisher: American Chemical Society (USA)
- Frequency: Monthly
- Impact factor: 2.6 (2022)

Standard abbreviations
- ISO 4: J. Chem. Eng. Data

Indexing
- CODEN: jceaax
- ISSN: 0021-9568 (print); 1520-5134 (web)

Links
- Journal homepage

The Journal of Chemical & Engineering Data is a peer-reviewed scientific journal, published since 1956 by the American Chemical Society. JCED is currently indexed in: Chemical Abstracts Service (CAS), SCOPUS, EBSCOhost, ProQuest, British Library, PubMed, Ovid, Web of Science, and SwetsWise.

The current Editor is J. Ilja Siepmann. According to the Journal Citation Reports, the journal has a 2022 impact factor of 2.6.
