= Manos Mavrikakis =

Greek–American chemical engineer

- Born: Greece

Academic background
- Education: Diploma, Chemical Engineering, National Technical University of Athens; MS, Applied Mathematics, PhD, Chemical Engineering & Scientific Computing, University of Michigan

Academic work
- Institutions: University of Wisconsin–Madison

Manos Mavrikakis is a Greek–American chemical engineer. He is the Paul A. Elfers Professor and the Vilas Distinguished Achievement Professor of Chemical Engineering at the University of Wisconsin–Madison. Mavrikakis is an elected Fellow of the American Association for the Advancement of Science, American Physical Society, and American Vacuum Society.

== Early life and education ==
Mavrikakis received his diploma from the school of chemical engineering of the National Technical University of Athens and his master's degree and Ph.D. in chemical engineering and scientific computing from the University of Michigan. Following this, he finished his postdoctoral fellowship at the University of Delaware and became a Marie-Curie postdoctoral fellow at the Center for Atomic-scale Materials Physics of the Technical University of Denmark.

== Career ==
Upon completing his formal education, Mavrikakis became an assistant professor at the college of engineering of the University of Wisconsin–Madison in 1999. He was shortly thereafter promoted to associate professor and eventually full professor. As an associate professor, Mavrikakis won the 2009 Paul H. Emmett Award in Fundamental Catalysis from the North American Catalysis Society. The award was established to "recognize and encourage individual contributions in the field of catalysis with emphasis on discovery and understanding of catalytic phenomena, the proposal of catalytic reaction mechanisms and identification of and description of catalytic sites and species." The following year, he demonstrated the low-temperature efficacy of an atomically dispersed platinum catalyst.

During his tenure at UW–Madison, Mavrikakis studied the elucidation of detailed reaction mechanisms for heterogeneously catalyzed reactions and the identification of improved catalytic materials from first-principles. His contributions to the development and use of density functional theory in the understanding of site-specific chemical reactions and the determination and design of new catalytic materials were recognized with an election to the American Physical Society in 2013. The following year, Mavrikakis was also elected a Fellow of the American Association for the Advancement of Science "for outstanding contributions to our fundamental understanding of the site-specific chemical reactions leading to new catalytic materials." He also received the Kellett Mid-Career Award from UW–Madison, which provided him with $60,000 of research funding, and the R. H. Wilhelm Award in Chemical Reaction Engineering.

In 2015, Mavrikakis was appointed a Vilas Distinguished Achievement Professor of Chemical and Biological Engineering. While serving in this role, his research team arranged the nanoscale structure of particles to achieve more potent chemical reactions while using less material. The following year, Mavrikakis was elected a Fellow of the American Vacuum Society and received their Prairie Chapter Outstanding Researcher Award. In 2019, Mavrikakis was recognized by the American Chemical Society with the Gabor A. Somorjai Award for Creative Research in Catalysis for "creatively combining computer-based techniques that simulate molecular structure and reactivity with experiments that provide insight into the nature of the active site during catalytic reactions and help identify improved catalysts." The following month, he received the 2019 Herman Pines Award from the Catalysis Club of Chicago for outstanding contributions in the catalysis research area.

During the COVID-19 pandemic, Mavrikakis, Roberto Schimmenti, Ahmed Elnabawy, and a team of researchers were the first to synthesize freestanding bismuthene and prove it was a catalyst for converting carbon dioxide to chemicals. Later, Mavrikakis was the recipient of the 2021 Robert Burwell Lectureship in Catalysis from the North American Catalysis Society. After serving as the editor-in-chief of the journal Surface Science since 2012, Mavrikakis stepped down in 2021 and was replaced by Hans-Peter Steinrück.
