= Eric Beckman =

American engineer

Eric J. Beckman
- Education: MIT (BS, 1980); University of Massachusetts Amherst (PhD, 1988)
- Occupations: Chemical Engineer, Professor, Entrepreneur
- Known for: Green chemistry, Supercritical carbon dioxide technology, Sustainable polymers
- Awards: National Academy of Engineering (2024); Presidential Green Chemistry Challenge Award (2002); American Chemical Society Heroes of Chemistry (2005)
- Engineering career
- Significant design: Molecularly-engineered CO2-philes, Surgical adhesives

Eric J. Beckman (born c. 1959) is an American engineer.

He is married to Joanne. He graduated from the Massachusetts Institute of Technology in 1980, with a degree in chemical engineering. He worked for Monsanto Plastics and Resins and Union Carbide before opting to pursue further study, specializing in polymer chemistry and processing at the University of Massachusetts. Beckman earned his doctorate in 1988, and was a postdoctoral researcher at Battelle Memorial Institute's Pacific Northwest Laboratory. He joined the University of Pittsburgh faculty in 1989, and was named an associate professor in 1994, followed by a promotion to full professor in 1997. By 2000, Beckman had been appointed Bayer Professor of Chemical and Petroleum Engineering and associate dean for research at Pitt. Beckman later vacated the associate deanship to chair the department of chemical and petroleum engineering, and subsequently assumed the George M. Bevier Professorship of Engineering. Michael Lovell replaced Beckman as associate dean of research. Beckman cofounded Cohera Medical, Inc. in 2005. Through their work at the company, Beckman and Michael Buckley invented the surgical adhesive TissuGlu. In 2020, Beckman was elected a fellow of the National Academy of Inventors.
