= Shana O. Kelley =

Canadian scientist

- Education: Seton Hall University BA (1994); California Institute of Technology PhD (1999)
- Spouse: Edward H. Sargent
- Scientific career
- Workplaces: Boston College; University of Toronto; Northwestern University; Chan Zuckerberg Biohub
- Thesis: Electron transfer through the DNA double helix: spectroscopic and electrochemical studies (1999)
- Doctoral advisor: Jacqueline Barton
- Other academic advisors: Paul Schimmel
- Website: kelleylaboratory.northwestern.edu

Shana O. Kelley is a scientist and Neena B. Schwartz Professor of Chemistry and Biomedical Engineering at Northwestern University. She is affiliated with Northwestern's International Institute for Nanotechnology and was previously part of the University of Toronto's Faculty of Pharmacy and Faculty of Medicine. Kelley's research includes the development of new technologies for clinical diagnostics and drug delivery. In 2023, she was chosen as president of Chicago's new Chan Zuckerberg Biohub.

== Education and training ==
Kelley received her BS from Seton Hall University in 1994. She pursued graduate studies in chemistry at the California Institute of Technology, where she worked with Jacqueline Barton. She graduated with her PhD in 1999 with a dissertation entitled Electron Transfer through the DNA Double Helix: Spectroscopic and Electrochemical Studies.

From 1999 to 2000, Kelley was a NIH Postdoctoral Fellow at the Scripps Research Institute, where she worked with Paul Schimmel on research of RNA.

== Career ==
Kelley began her independent research career as an Assistant Professor in the Chemistry Department at Boston College in 2000. In 2006, she was promoted directly to the rank of Full Professor and in 2007, she joined the Leslie Dan Faculty of Pharmacy at the University of Toronto. In August 2021, she joined Northwestern University's Departments of Chemistry and Biomedical Engineering as a named professor. It was announced in March 2023 that she would head the new Chan Zuckerberg Biohub in Chicago, which will be a collaboration between Northwestern, University of Chicago, and University of Illinois at Urbana-Champaign.

Kelley founded a university spin-off company named GeneOhm Sciences with her graduate advisor Jacqueline Barton. GeneOhm Sciences was based on a discovery that Kelley made during her graduate studies, where she developed a method to detect mutations in DNA by modifying the DNA strands and measuring their differing conductivity. GeneOhm Sciences used Kelley's discovery to create a diagnostic test for antibiotic-resistant MRSA bacteria. GeneOhm was acquired by Becton Dickinson in early 2006. Kelley also founded the molecular diagnostics company Xagenic Inc. and the biomarker measurement company Arma Biosciences. In April 2023, she launched a new company, CTRL Therapeutics, which aims to improve existing cell therapy in cancer treatment by focusing on the CTRL gene.

== Awards ==
- 2000 Dreyfus New Faculty Award
- 2000 Research Innovation Award
- 2008 Named one of Canada's Top 40 Under 40
- 2004 MIT Technology Review TR100 Top Innovator
- 2004 Alfred P. Sloan Research Fellowship
- 2004 NSF CAREER Award
- 2005 Camille-Dreyfus Teacher-Scholar Award
- 2010 NSERC E.W.R Steacie Fellowship
- 2011 University of Toronto Inventor of the Year
- 2011 Steacie Prize
- 2013 University of Toronto Distinguished Professor Award
- 2016 SLAS Innovation Award
- 2016 NSERC Brockhouse Award
- 2016 Fellow, American Institute for Medical and Biological Engineering
- 2016 Fellow, Canadian Academy of Health Sciences
- 2017 ACS Inorganic Nanoscience Award
- 2017 Somorjai Visiting Miller Professorship (UC Berkeley)
- 2018 Distinguished Visiting Fellow, Rowland Institute, Harvard University
- 2020 AFPC / Pfizer Research Career Award
- 2021 Fellow of the Royal Society of Canada
- 2021 Order of Ontario
- 2022 Guggenheim Fellowship
- 2022 Doolittle Award, American Chemical Society
- 2023 Fellow, American Academy of Arts and Sciences

== Personal life ==
Kelley is married to fellow University of Toronto Professor Ted Sargent. They met at a nanotechnology conference at UC Irvine, and have two children together.
