= Enrique Iglesia =

Chemical engineer

Enrique Iglesia is a chemical engineer who holds the Theodore Vermeulen Chair in Chemical Engineering at the University of California, Berkeley. He is a Faculty Senior Scientist at the Lawrence Berkeley, and he previously served as the Director of the UC Berkeley Catalysis Center.

== Early life ==
Iglesia was born in Cuba and his family is originally from Spain. In 1969, his family relocated to the United States. As a young immigrant with limited English, he developed an interest in mathematics and chemistry subjects because they did not rely heavily on his language skills. His strengths in these subjects were recognized by his teachers, who, despite his language barrier, encouraged him to apply to top universities.

== Education ==
Iglesia attended Princeton University from 1973 to 1977, where he studied chemical engineering. He received his B.S degree as the top-ranked graduating senior in the College of Engineering. He completed an internship at Exxon's corporate research laboratories as a research associate, where he worked on engineering problems and found an interest in catalysis. Iglesia received his Master of Science degree from Stanford University in 1979. After he received his PhD at Stanford University in 1982.

== Career ==
Iglesia began his professional career at Exxon Research where he worked on catalytic processes relevant to energy. In 1993 he joined the faculty at the University of California, Berkeley, where he was Professor of Chemical Engineering in the Department of Chemical and Biomolecular Engineering and was later appointed to the Theodore Vermeulen Chair in Chemical Engineering in 2009. Iglesia was recognized for his dedication to teaching and mentorship and received the Donald Sterling Noyce Teaching Prize, the highest teaching honor in the physical sciences at UC Berkeley. Iglesia served as Editor-in-Chief of the Journal of Catalysis. Among one of his innovations is a zeolite based technology that is currently used as a catalyst in oil and chemical industry. Iglesia was elected to the American Academy of Arts and Sciences in 2015 for his work in chemical engineering and catalysis, especially related to sustainable energy processes and environmental protection. He worked as a scientist at the Lawrence Berkeley National Lab. Iglesia is one of 175 top inventors named as a fellow by the National Academy of Inventors.

== Achievements and awards ==
Iglesia was elected to the National Academy of Engineering in 2008. He was also elected to the National Academy of Inventors in 2016.

Iglesia received the Alpha Chi Sigma Award for Chemical Engineering Research in 2011. In 2012 he received the Gabor A. Somorjai Award for Creative Research in Catalysis. In 2018 he received the William H. Walker Award for Excellence in Contributions to Chemical Engineering Literature. In 2019 he received the Michel Boudart Award for the Advancement of Catalysis. He was awarded the 2021 NACS Award for Distinguished Service in the Advancement of Catalysis. He was also awarded the 2023 Faraday Lectureship Prize.

Iglesia is a fellow of the American Chemical Society, Japan Society for the Promotion of Science, American Institute of Chemical Engineers, American Academy of Arts and Sciences, and the Royal Society of Chemistry. He is also an Honorary Fellow of the Chinese Chemical Society and was a Neil Armstrong Visiting Fellow of Purdue University from 2018 to 2021.
