= Jingming Xu =

Chinese engineer

Jingming "Jimmy" Xu is an engineer, currently the Charles C. Tillinghast '32 University Professor at Brown University and Chang-Jiang Chair in Physics at University of Electronic Science and Technology of China, also having been the James Ham Chair in Optoelectronics (1992–1997) and Nortel Professor of Emerging Technology at University of Toronto (1997–1999). He is a Fellow of the American Association for the Advancement of Science, IEEE, American Physical Society and Institute of Physics.
