= List of members of the National Academy of Engineering (chemical) =

This list is a subsection of the List of members of the National Academy of Engineering, which includes members and international members of the United States National Academy of Engineering, living and deceased, each affiliated with one of the academy's disciplinary sections. Members are listed under their primary section, and each entry gives the person's name, primary institution, and election year. For deceased members, the year of death is noted.

== Chemical ==
Name	Institution	Year elected
Nicholas L. Abbott	Cornell University	2014
Andreas Acrivos (died 2025)	Stanford University	1977
Claire S. Adjiman	Imperial College London	2023
Noubar B. Afeyan	Flagship Pioneering	2022
Rakesh Agrawal	Purdue University	2002
Ilhan A. Aksay	Princeton University	2010
Monty M. Alger	The Pennsylvania State University	2010
Richard C. Alkire	University of Illinois Urbana-Champaign	1988
David Thomas Allen	The University of Texas at Austin	2017
Robert D. Allen	National Renewable Energy Laboratory	2012
Neal R. Amundson (died 2011)	University of Houston	1970
John E. Anderson (died 2012)	Praxair, Inc.	1991
John L. Anderson	National Academy of Engineering	1992
Lynden A. Archer	Cornell University	2018
Rutherford Aris (died 2005)	University of Minnesota, Minneapolis	1975
Robert C. Armstrong	Massachusetts Institute of Technology	2008
Gianni Astarita (died 1997)	University of Naples	1994
Amos A. Avidan	Bechtel Corporation	2009
Albert Leslie Babb (died 2014)	University of Washington	1972
Gerard Marcel Abel Baillely	Retiree – The Procter & Gamble Company	2025
Nitash Pervez Balsara	University of California, Berkeley	2026
William F. Banholzer	University of Wisconsin-Madison	2002
Mark A. Barteau	Texas A&M University	2006
Frank S. Bates	University of Minnesota	2002
Martin Zdenek Bazant	Massachusetts Institute of Technology	2025
Jeffrey S. Beck (died 2012)	ExxonMobil Chemical Company	2011
Gregg T. Beckham	National Renewable Energy Laboratory	2025
Arnold O. Beckman (died 2004)	Beckman Instruments, Inc.	1967
Alexis T. Bell	University of California, Berkeley	1987
Giuseppe Bellussi	Eni S.p.A	2021
David Bem	PPG Industries, Inc.	2021
Stacey Francine Bent	Stanford University	2020
Carolyn R. Bertozzi	Stanford University	2024
Madan M. Bhasin	Mid-Atlantic Technology, Research and Innovation Center (MATRIC)	2006
Lorenz T. Biegler	Carnegie Mellon University	2013
R. Byron Bird (died 2020)	University of Wisconsin-Madison	1969
Kenneth B. Bischoff (died 2006)	University of Delaware	1988
Donna G. Blackmond	Scripps Research	2013
Samuel W. Bodman (died 2018)	U.S. Department of Energy	2006
F. Peter Boer (died 2022)	Tiger Scientific Inc.	1993
David Vernon Boger (died 2025)	University of Melbourne	2017
Dante Patrick Bonaquist	Praxair, Inc.	2026
Dana C. Bookbinder	Independent Consultant	2018
Dr Shailendra V. Bordawekar	AbbVie, Inc.	2024
Michel Boudart (died 2012)	Stanford University	1979
Christopher N. Bowman	University of Colorado Boulder	2021
Raymond F. Boyer (died 1993)	Michigan Molecular Institute	1978
Richard D. Braatz	Massachusetts Institute of Technology	2019
John F. Brady	California Institute of Technology	1999
Nigel Peter Brandon	Imperial College London	2022
Joan F Brennecke	The University of Texas at Austin	2012
Howard Brenner (died 2014)	Massachusetts Institute of Technology	1980
P.L. Thibaut Brian (died 2018)	Air Products and Chemicals, Inc.	1975
Jeffery Christopher Bricker	Honeywell UOP	2023
Esteban A. Brignole	Universidad Nacional Sur/CONICET PLAPIQUI	2019
Linda J. Broadbelt	Northwestern University - Evanston	2019
David Brown (died 2012)	Halcon International, Inc.	1978
Robert A. Brown	Boston University	1991
Christopher Burcham	University of Illinois Urbana-Champaign	2026
Theodore A. Burtis (died 2001)	Sun Company, Inc.	1984
Carlos A. Cabrera	Genomatica, Inc.	2021
Gary S. Calabrese	Corning Incorporated	2008
Xianghong Cao	China Petrochemical Corporation (SINOPEC)	2009
John D. Caplan (died 1998)	General Motors	1973
James J. Carberry (died 2000)	University of Notre Dame	1989
Ruben G. Carbonell	North Carolina State University	2014
Emily A. Carter	Princeton Plasma Physics Laboratory	2016
Michael E. Cates	University of Cambridge	2019
Arup K. Chakraborty	Massachusetts Institute of Technology	2004
Chau-Chyun Chen	Texas Tech University	2005
Jingguang Chen	Columbia University	2024
Nai Y. Chen (died 2017)	University of Texas at Arlington	1990
Leo Chiang	Lubrizol Corporation	2023
Stuart W. Churchill (died 2016)	University of Pennsylvania	1974
Bjerne S. Clausen	Haldor Topsoe A/S	2025
Robert E. Cohen	Massachusetts Institute of Technology	2010
Dimitris I. Collias	Procter & Gamble Company (retired)	2023
Harry W. Coover (died 2011)	Independent Consultant	1983
Avelino Corma	Instituto de Tecnologia Quimica	2007
Peter T. Cummings	Heriot-Watt University	2023
Jennifer Sinclair Curtis	University of California, Davis	2023
Edward L. Cussler	University of Minnesota, Minneapolis	2002
Charles R. Cutler (died 2020)	University of Houston	2000
Donald A. Dahlstrom (died 2004)	University of Utah	1975
John F. Davidson (died 2019)	University of Cambridge	1976
Duncan S. Davies (died 1987)	U.K. Department of Industry	1978
Reg Davies (died 2022)	Particle Science and Technology	1999
H. Ted Davis (died 2009)	University of Minnesota, Minneapolis	1988
Mark E. Davis	California Institute of Technology	1997
W. Kenneth Davis (died 2005)	Independent Consultant	1970
Juan J. de Pablo	New York University	2016
Pablo G. Debenedetti	Princeton University	2000
Lili Deligianni	Independent	2019
Kenneth G. Denbigh (died 2004)	University of London	1981
Morton M. Denn	The City College of the City University of New York	1986
John H. Dessauer (died 1993)	Xerox Corporation	1967
Nance Katherine Dicciani	RTM Vital Signs, LLC	2025
Michael Francis Doherty	University of California, Santa Barbara	2016
Masao Doi	Beihang University	2016
L. K. Doraiswamy (died 2012)	Iowa State University	2010
James M. Douglas (died 2017)	University of Massachusetts at Amherst	1996
Elisabeth M. Drake (died 2024)	Massachusetts Institute of Technology	1992
J. Larry Duda (died 2006)	The Pennsylvania State University - University Park	1998
James A. Dumesic	University of Wisconsin-Madison	1998
Francis G. Dwyer (died 2017)	Independent Consultant	1993
Charles A. Eckert	Georgia Institute of Technology	1983
Thomas Flynn Edgar	The University of Texas at Austin	2014
John F. Elliott (died 1991)	Massachusetts Institute of Technology	1975
Richard E. Emmert	E.I. du Pont de Nemours & Company	1985
Lawrence B. Evans	Massachusetts Institute of Technology	2001
James R. Fair (died 2010)	The University of Texas at Austin	1974
Liang-Shih Fan	The Ohio State University	2001
Margaret Mary Faul	Amgen, Inc.	2020
Bruce A. Finlayson	University of Washington	1994
Harold W. Fisher (died 2000)	ExxonMobil	1969
Christodoulos A. Floudas (died 2016)	Texas A&M University	2011
Maria Flytzani-Stephanopoulos (died 2019)	Tufts University	2014
Robert C. Forney (died 2016)	E.I. du Pont de Nemours & Company	1989
Curtis W. Frank	Stanford University	2013
Glenn H. Fredrickson	University of California, Santa Barbara	2003
Benny Dean Freeman	The University of Texas at Austin	2023
Sheldon K. Friedlander (died 2007)	University of California, Los Angeles	1975
William L. Friend (died 2021)	Bechtel Group, Inc.	1993
Gilbert F. Froment	Texas A&M University	1999
Gerald G. Fuller	Stanford University	2005
Shun Chong Fung (died 2021)	ExxonMobil Research and Engineering Company	2007
Mauricio Futran	Pharmaceutical Engineering Solutions	2003
Elmer L. Gaden (died 2012)	University of Virginia	1974
Haren S. Gandhi (died 2010)	Ford Motor Company	1999
Salvador García Muñoz	Eli Lilly and Company	2024
Alice P. Gast (died 2025)	Imperial College London	2001
Bruce Clark Gates	University of California, Davis	2007
Lee S. Gaumer (died 2010)	Air Products and Chemicals, Inc.	1992
Rajeev Gautam	Honeywell Performance Materials and Technologies	2020
William H. Gauvin (died 1994)	McGill University	1987
Edwin Austin Gee (died 2013)	International Paper Company	1979
Marian E. Gindy	Merck	2025
Lynn Faith Gladden	University of Cambridge	2015
Eduardo D. Glandt	University of Pennsylvania	1996
Karen Klincewicz Gleason	Massachusetts Institute of Technology	2015
Sharon C. Glotzer	University of Michigan	2019
Arthur L. Goldstein	Ionics, Incorporated	1996
Robert Walton Gore (died 2020)	W.L. Gore & Associates	1995
Raymond J. Gorte	University of Pennsylvania	2018
William W. Graessley (died 2017)	Princeton University	1990
Robert K. Grasselli (died 2018)	University of Delaware	1995
Ignacio E. Grossmann	Carnegie Mellon University	2000
Deborah L. Grubbe	Operations and Safety Solutions, LLC	2023
Elisabeth Louise Marie Guazzelli	CNRS-University of Paris Cité	2021
Keith E. Gubbins	North Carolina State University	1989
Robert C. Gunness (died 2004)	Standard Oil Company	1969
Vladimir Haensel (died 2002)	University of Massachusetts at Amherst	1974
Carol K. Hall	North Carolina State University	2005
Paula T. Hammond	Massachusetts Institute of Technology	2017
Thomas J. Hanratty (died 2016)	University of Illinois Urbana-Champaign	1974
John Happel (died 2001)	Columbia University	1981
W. Lincoln Hawkins (died 1992)	Independent Consultant	1975
Victoria Franchetti Haynes	RTI International	2012
L. Louis Hegedus (died 2017)	Arkema Inc.	1989
Heinz Heinemann (died 2005)	Lawrence Berkeley National Laboratory	1976
Geoffrey F. Hewitt (died 2019)	Imperial College London	1998
Edward John Hinch	University of Cambridge	2012
Teh C. Ho	ExxonMobil Research and Engineering Company	2016
W.S. Winston Ho	The Ohio State University	2002
L. Wally Holm (died 1989)	Unocal Corporation	1986
Jennifer R. Holmgren	Lanzatech	2017
Csaba Horvath (died 2004)	Yale University	2004
Hoyt C. Hottel (died 1998)	Massachusetts Institute of Technology	1974
John L. Hudson (died 2016)	University of Virginia	2008
Arthur E. Humphrey (died 2026)	Lehigh University	1973
Patricia Nell Hurter	Lyndra Therapeutics	2021
Taeghwan Hyeon	Seoul National University	2024
James D. Idol (died 2015)	Rutgers, The State University of New Jersey, New Brunswick	1986
Enrique Iglesia	Purdue University	2008
Sheldon E. Isakoff (died 2012)	E.I. du Pont de Nemours & Company	1980
Jacob N. Israelachvili (died 2018)	University of California, Santa Barbara	1996
Joseph J. Jacobs (died 2004)	Jacobs Engineering Group Inc.	1994
Allen F. Jacobson (died 2012)	Minnesota Mining & Manufacturing Company	1991
Stephen B. Jaffe	ExxonMobil	2006
Edward G. Jefferson (died 2006)	E.I. du Pont de Nemours & Company	1986
Samson A. Jenekhe	University of Washington	2022
Klavs F. Jensen	Massachusetts Institute of Technology	2002
Marvin M. Johnson (died 2017)	Phillips Petroleum Company	1994
Keith P Johnston	The University of Texas at Austin	2011
Christopher W. Jones	Georgia Institute of Technology	2022
Jyeshtharaj Bhalchandra Joshi	University Institute of Chemical Technology (UICT)	2021
William H. Joyce	Advanced Fusion Systems	1997
Edgar Snyder Sanders Jr.	Osmoses	2026
John F. Welch Jr. (died 2020)	Jack Welch, LLC	1983
John J. McKetta Jr. (died 2019)	The University of Texas at Austin	1970
Joseph A. Miller Jr.	Corning Incorporated	1998
Lawrence E. Swabb Jr. (died 2017)	Exxon Research & Engineering Company	1977
Olester Benson Jr.	3M Company	2025
Thomas Francis Degnan Jr.	University of Notre Dame	2013
Thomas M. Connelly Jr.	American Chemical Society	2016
Vern W. Weekman Jr. (died 2024)	Princeton University	1985
Ganesh Kailasam	Oil and Gas Climate Initiative	2013
Eric W. Kaler	Case Western Reserve University	2010
Edward R. Kane (died 2011)	E.I. du Pont de Nemours & Company	1979
Teresa Plumley Karjala	Dow	2026
Frederick J. Karol (died 2018)	Union Carbide Corporation	1992
Dimitris E. Katsoulis	The Dow Chemical Company	2017
James R. Katzer (died 2012)	Independent Consultant	1998
Ora Kedem (died 2026)	Weizmann Institute of Science	2005
George E. Keller II (died 2019)	Mid-Atlantic Technology, Research and Innovation Center (MATRIC)	1988
Ioannis George Kevrekidis	Johns Hopkins University	2020
Chaitan Khosla	Stanford University	2009
Sangtae Kim	Purdue University	2001
C. Judson King	University of California System	1981
Chalmer G. Kirkbride (died 1998)	Kirkbride Associates, Inc.	1967
Henry Z. Kister	Fluor Corporation	2011
John Klier	University of Oklahoma	2015
Riki Kobayashi (died 2013)	Rice University	1995
Brian A. Korgel	The University of Texas at Austin	2018
Julia Ann Kornfield	California Institute of Technology	2020
Frederick J. Krambeck	ReacTech Inc	1999
Hendrik Kramers (died 2006)	Akzo Nobel N.V.	1978
Lester C. Krogh (died 2013)	Minnesota Mining & Manufacturing Company	1988
Anil Kumar	PPG Industries, Inc.	2019
Joseph T. Kummer (died 1997)	Ford Motor Company	1986
Stephanie L. Kwolek (died 2014)	E.I. du Pont de Nemours & Company	2001
Ralph Landau (died 2004)	Stanford University	1972
Ronald G. Larson	University of Michigan	2003
Gerald D. Laubach	Pfizer	1987
Stephen Lawroski (died 1997)	Argonne National Laboratory	1969
Leslie Gary Leal	University of California, Santa Barbara	1987
Ludwik Leibler	Ecole Superieure de Physique et Chimie Industrielles	2004
Abraham M. Lenhoff	University of Delaware	2026
Johannes A. Lercher	Pacific Northwest National Laboratory	2017
Octave Levenspiel (died 2017)	Oregon State University	2000
Benjamin G. Levich (died 1987)	City University of New York	1982
Alison Emslie Lewis	University of Cape Town	2024
Norman N. Li	NL Chemical Technology, Inc.	1990
Rebecca Liebert	Lubrizol Corporation	2022
Henry R. Linden (died 2009)	Illinois Institute of Technology	1974
Chunqing Liu	Honeywell Inc.	2024
Michael J. Lockett	State University of New York at Buffalo	2008
Timothy Patrick Lodge	University of Minnesota, Minneapolis	2024
John P. Longwell (died 2004)	Massachusetts Institute of Technology	1976
Yueh-Lin Loo	Princeton University	2025
Po-Yen Lu	CID Group	2025
Dan Luss	University of Houston	1984
John Fredrick MacGregor	McMaster University	2026
Alexander MacLachlan	E.I. du Pont de Nemours & Company	1992
Robert J. Madix (died 2023)	Harvard University	2022
Edward Joseph Maginn	University of Notre Dame	2026
Robert Malpas (died 2023)	Eurotunnel PLC	1985
Concetta La Marca	Chemours	2025
Wolfgang H. Marquardt	Forschungszentrum Julich GmbH	2020
Giuseppe Marrucci	University of Napoli Federico II	2003
W. Robert Marshall (died 1988)	University of Wisconsin-Madison	1967
Raghunath A. Mashelkar	National Chemical Laboratory	2003
Edward A. Mason (died 2010)	Amoco	1975
Stanley G. Mason (died 1987)	McGill University	1980
James F. Mathis (died 2021)	Exxon	1990
Stephen L. Matson (died 2023)	Tufts University	1995
Walter G. May (died 2015)	University of Illinois Urbana-Champaign	1978
Jerry McAfee (died 1995)	Gulf Oil	1967
Robert W. McCabe	Ford Motor Company	2017
Karen McKee	ExxonMobil	2025
Paul F. McKenzie	CSL Behring	2020
Seymour L. Meisel (died 2015)	Mobil Research & Development Corporation	1981
Paul Mensah	Pfizer	2022
Arthur B. Metzner (died 2006)	University of Delaware	1979
Jarold A. Meyer	Chevron Research Company	1995
Alan S. Michaels (died 2000)	Alan Sherman Michaels, Sc.D., Inc.	1979
Harold S. Mickley (died 2011)	Stauffer Chemical Company	1978
William E. Mickols	Mickols Consulting LLC	2025
G. Alexander Mills (died 2004)	University of Delaware	1977
Barbara Haviland Minor	Chemours	2026
John R. Monnier (died 2024)	University of South Carolina	2017
Manfred Morari	University of Pennsylvania	1993
Massimo Silvio Morbidelli	Aristotle University of Thessaloniki	2026
Jeffrey F. Morris	City College of New York	2026
Paul Franklin Nealey	The University of Chicago	2018
John S. Newman	University of California, Berkeley	1999
Charles Noelke	E.I. du Pont de Nemours & Company	2009
Robert M. Nowak	C and R Solutions, LLC.	1992
Jens K. Nørskov	Technical University of Denmark	2015
Alex G. Oblad (died 2000)	University of Utah	1975
Babatunde Ogunnaike (died 2022)	University of Delaware	2012
George A. Olah (died 2017)	University of Southern California	2009
James Y. Oldshue (died 2007)	Oldshue Technologies International	1980
Julio M. Ottino	Northwestern University - Evanston	1997
Umit S. Ozkan	The Ohio State University	2024
Maria Palasis	Lyra Therapeutics	2021
Athanassios Z. Panagiotopoulos	Princeton University	2004
Aniruddha B. Pandit	Institute of Chemical Technology (ICT) Mumbai	2023
Constantinos Pantelides	Imperial College London	2024
David Parrillo	The Dow Chemical Company	2023
Max S. Peters (died 2011)	University of Colorado Boulder	1969
Cornelius J. Pings (died 2004)	University of Southern California	1981
Fred H. Poettmann (died 1995)	Colorado School of Mines	1978
Joseph B. Powell	University of Houston	2021
C. Dwight Prater (died 2001)	Mobil Research & Development Corporation	1977
John M. Prausnitz	University of California, Berkeley	1979
Robert K. Prud'homme	Princeton University	2024
John A. Quinn (died 2016)	University of Pennsylvania	1978
Michael P. Ramage	ExxonMobil Research and Engineering Company	1996
Doraiswami Ramkrishna	Purdue University	2009
James B. Rawlings	University of California, Santa Barbara	2016
W. Harmon Ray	University of Wisconsin-Madison	1991
Eric H. Reichl (died 2014)	Independent Consultant	1975
Robert C. Reid (died 2006)	Massachusetts Institute of Technology	1980
Gintaras V. Reklaitis	Purdue University	2007
James Edward Rekoske	Ecolab, Inc.	2023
Robert B. Richards (died 1988)	General Electric Company	1970
Walter L. Robb (died 2020)	Vantage Management, Inc.	1982
Lanny A. Robbins	Iowa State University	2006
Anne K. Roby	Linde, PLC	2020
Lubomyr T. Romankiw (died 2024)	IBM Thomas J. Watson Research Center	2014
Joe B. Rosenbaum (died 1987)	Bureau of Mines	1973
Ronald E. Rosensweig	Independent Consultant	1985
James F. Roth (died 2021)	Air Products and Chemicals, Inc.	1982
Eli Ruckenstein (died 2020)	State University of New York at Buffalo	1990
Dale F. Rudd (died 2018)	University of Wisconsin-Madison	1978
William B. Russel (died 2023)	Princeton University	1993
Thomas P. Russell	University of Massachusetts at Amherst	2008
Thomas William Fraser Russell (died 2019)	University of Delaware	1990
Alfred Saffer (died 2012)	Halcon S.D. Group, Inc.	1978
Stanley I. Sandler	University of Delaware	1996
José G. Santiesteban	Exxon Research & Engineering Company	2016
Roger W.H. Sargent (died 2018)	Imperial College London	1993
Adel F. Sarofim (died 2011)	University of Utah	2003
Dudley A. Saville (died 2006)	Princeton University	2003
Robert S. Schechter (died 2014)	The University of Texas at Austin	1976
Warren G. Schlinger (died 2017)	Texaco Inc.	1991
Lanny D. Schmidt (died 2020)	University of Minnesota, Minneapolis	1994
Roger A. Schmitz (died 2013)	University of Notre Dame	1984
William R. Schowalter	Princeton University	1982
Walter J. Schrenk (died 2018)	The Dow Chemical Company	1994
Alan Schriesheim	Chicago Council on Science and Technology	1989
Shirley E. Schwartz (died 2016)	General Motors	2000
Charles D. Scott (died 2022)	Oak Ridge National Laboratory	1986
John W. Scott (died 2006)	Chevron Corporation	1982
L Edward Scriven (died 2007)	University of Minnesota, Minneapolis	1978
Jill E. Seebergh	The Boeing Company	2024
Rachel A. Segalman	University of California, Santa Barbara	2021
Andreas Seidel-Morgenstern	Max Planck Institute for Dynamics of Complex Technical Systems	2023
John H. Seinfeld	California Institute of Technology	1982
Hratch G. Semerjian	National Institute of Standards and Technology	2000
Johanna M. H. Levelt Sengers (died 2024)	National Institute of Standards and Technology	1992
Jayshree Seth	3M	2026
Eric Stefan Garrido Shaqfeh	Stanford University	2013
Man Mohan Sharma	Mumbai University	2006
Mordecai Shelef (died 2020)	Ford Motor Company	2001
Martin B. Sherwin	W. R. Grace and Company	1998
Reuel Shinnar (died 2011)	The City College of the City University of New York	1985
David Scott Sholl	Rice University	2024
Jeffrey J. Siirola	Purdue University	1994
John H. Sinfelt (died 2011)	Exxon Research & Engineering Company	1975
Shivaji Sircar (died 2020)	Lehigh University	2004
William P. Slichter (died 1990)	AT&T Bell Laboratories	1976
Cedomir M. Sliepcevich (died 2009)	University of Oklahoma	1972
Joe Mauk Smith (died 2009)	University of California, Davis	1975
Kenneth A. Smith	Massachusetts Institute of Technology	1983
Stuart L. Soled	ExxonMobil Technology and Engineering Company	2014
Clifford L. Spiro	Cliff Spiro Consulting Group	2018
Arthur M. Squires (died 2012)	Virginia Polytechnic Institute and State University	1977
Arnold F. Stancell	Mobil Oil Corporation	1997
Kathleen J. Stebe	University of Pennsylvania	2021
George Stephanopoulos	Massachusetts Institute of Technology	1999
Charles V. Sternling (died 2017)	Shell Development Company	1987
Warren E. Stewart (died 2006)	University of Wisconsin-Madison	1992
Howard A Stone	Princeton University	2009
Michael S. Strano	Massachusetts Institute of Technology	2017
Yongkui Sun	Ionova	2016
Morgan Chuan-Yuan Sze (died 2015)	Independent Consultant	1976
Jose E. Tabora-Sierra	Bristol Myers Squibb Company	2024
Zehev Tadmor	Technion-Israel Institute of Technology	1991
Jefferson W. Tester	Cornell University	2021
Doros Nicolas Theodorou	National Technical University of Athens	2015
Michael Paul Thien	Takeda Pharmaceuticals	2026
Larry F. Thompson	IPSS-LP	1989
Levi Theodore Thompson	University of South Florida	2021
Monte C. Throdahl (died 2001)	Monsanto Company	1980
Hye Kyung C. Timken	Chevron Corporation	2024
Klaus D. Timmerhaus (died 2011)	University of Colorado Boulder	1975
Matthew V. Tirrell	The University of Chicago	1997
Jean Wilim Tom	Princeton University	2019
Herbert L. Toor (died 2011)	Carnegie Mellon University	1990
Haldor F. A. Topsøe (died 2013)	Haldor Topsoe A/S	1984
Henrik Topsøe (died 2019)	Haldor Topsoe A/S	2013
Gavin P. Towler	Honeywell Inc.	2015
James A. Trainham III	University of Florida	1997
Michael Tsapatsis	Johns Hopkins University	2015
Rutger A. van Santen	Eindhoven University of Technology	2008
Constantinos G. Vayenas	University of Patras	2017
Venkat Venkatasubramanian	Columbia University	2025
Mark W. Verbrugge	General Motors Research and Development	2009
Bipin V. Vora	Vora International Process Corporation	2018
Israel E. Wachs	Lehigh University	2026
Norman Joseph Wagner III	University of Delaware	2015
Yong Wang	Washington State University	2025
Zhen-Gang Wang	California Institute of Technology	2025
William J. Ward III	GE Corporate Research and Development	1989
Darsh T. Wasan	Illinois Institute of Technology	2004
James Wei	Princeton University	1978
Felix J. Weinberg (died 2012)	Imperial College London	2001
W. Henry Weinberg	No Affiliation	1995
David H. West	Saudi Basic Industries Corporation (SABIC)	2022
Arthur W. Westerberg	Carnegie Mellon University	1987
James W. Westwater (died 2006)	University of Illinois Urbana-Champaign	1974
Ewald Wicke (died 2000)	University of Muenster	1983
Charles R. Wilke (died 2003)	University of California, Berkeley	1975
John J. Wise (died 2021)	Mobil Research & Development Corporation	1986
Karl Dane Wittrup	Massachusetts Institute of Technology	2012
Margaret M. Wu	ExxonMobil	2019
Kechang Xie	Chinese Academy of Engineering	2013
Ganapati D. Yadav	Institute of Chemical Technology (ICT) Mumbai	2022
Sakae Yagi (died 1991)	The University of Tokyo	1981
Yushan Yan	University of Delaware	2022
Ralph T. Yang (died 2026)	University of Michigan	2005
Taiyin Yang	Gilead Sciences, Inc.	2022
Caroline Melkonian Ylitalo	3M	2024
Fumitake Yoshida (died 2007)	Kyoto University	1979
Yuzhuo Steve Zhang	Shenhua Group Corporation Ltd.	2016
Stacey I. Zones	Chevron Energy Technology Company	2014
Charles F. Zukoski	University of Southern California	2007
