= List of founding members of the National Academy of Engineering =

This is a list of the founding members of the United States National Academy of Engineering.

- Hendrik Wade Bode
- Walker Lee Cisler
- Hugh Latimer Dryden
- Elmer William Engstrom
- William Littell Everitt
- Antoine Marc Gaudin
- Michael Lawrence Haider
- George Edward Holbrook
- John Herbert Hollomon, Jr.
- Thomas Christian Kavanagh
- Augustus Braun Kinzel
- James Nobel Landis
- Clarence Hugo Linder
- Clark Blanchard Millikan
- Nathan Mortimore Newmark
- William Hayward Pickering
- Simon Ramo
- Arthur Emmons Raymond
- Thomas Kilgore Sherwood
- Julius Adams Stratton
- Chauncey Guy Suits
- Frederick Emmons Terman
- Charles Allen Thomas
- Eric Arthur Walker
- Ernst Weber
