= Haldor Topsøe =

Haldor Topsøe may refer to:

- Haldor Topsøe (1842–1935), Danish chemist and crystallographer
- Haldor Topsøe (1913–2013), Danish engineer
- Haldor Topsøe (company), Danish catalysis company founded in 1940 by Haldor Topsøe (1913–2013)
