= William F. Banholzer =

American chemical engineer (born 1957)

- Born: January 23, 1957 (age 69)
- Education: Marquette University (B.S. in chemistry, 1979), University of Illinois at Urbana–Champaign (Ph.D. in chemical engineering, 1983)
- Known for: The first production of isotopically pure diamonds and leadership in R&D management.
- Awards: AIChE’s Government and Industry Leaders (AGILE) Award(2014), Earle B. Barnes Award for Leadership in Chemical Research Management (2014), Malcolm E. Pruitt Award (2012), Maurice Holland Award (2011), Election to the US National Academy of Engineering (2002)
- Scientific career
- Fields: American Industrial Chemist
- Workplaces: The Dow Chemical Company
- Thesis: The Interaction of Nitric Oxide and Carbon Monoxide with Platinum (1983)
- Doctoral advisor: R.A. Masel

William F. Banholzer (born January 23, 1957) is an American Professor of Chemical and Biological Engineering at the University of Wisconsin-Madison. Prior to this role, he was formally a chemical engineer and Executive Vice President and Chief Technology Officer at the Dow Chemical Company. He is most known for his leadership of industrial R&D organizations at both Dow Chemical Company and General Electric. He is also known for the discovery of methods related to production of synthetic diamond. In particular, the synthesis methods he developed allowed the production of isotopically pure diamonds.

He also developed high temperature coatings, including those used in stealth technology.

In 2002, Banholzer was elected as a member into the National Academy of Engineering for breakthroughs in stealth materials and contributions to the isotope effect in solid-state physics, and for business leadership.

== Education ==
Banholzer received his bachelor's in chemistry (with Math emphasis) from Marquette University in 1979 and his master's and Ph.D. in chemical engineering from the University of Illinois at Urbana–Champaign. His Ph.D. was granted in 1983. Banholzer's graduate work was with R.A. Masel studying fundamental interactions with implications for catalysis. His thesis study was "The Interaction of Nitric Oxide and Carbon Monoxide with Platinum."

== Advancements to chemistry ==
While a major contributor to the development of Radar-absorbent material for stealth technology, Banholzer is known primarily for the discovery, characterization, and commercial application of the Low Pressure method to create synthetic diamond. His work enabled the characterization of diamonds with exceptionally high purity and isotope composition. Banholzer was interviewed on the CBS News show 60 Minutes concerning the unique properties of these materials and over contentions surrounding inventorship. Banholzer has 16 issued US patents, and 87 scientific publications,

== Awards and achievements ==
Elected to the US National Academy of Engineering (2002), Banholzer has also received American Institute of Chemical Engineers (AIChE) Government and Industry Leaders (AGILE) Award, the American Chemical Society Earle B. Barnes Award for Leadership in Chemical Research Management (2014), the Council for Chemical Research Malcolm E. Pruitt Award (2012) and the Industrial Research Institute Maurice Holland Award (2011).

== Career ==
=== General Electric ===
- 1983-1988 - Started as a staff engineer at General Electric Corporate Research and Development.
- 1989-1992 - After 5 years as a staff engineer, Bill was promoted to Manager at GE Corporate Research and Development center. In this role he oversaw the CVD Projects Program as well as Advanced Inorganic Materials Laboratory. He was named to GE's executive band in 1992
- 1992-1997 - Bill transferred to the GE's Superabrasives division where he held a series of roles, including Engineering Manager-MBS Product Line for GE Plastic, Manager, R&D and Engineering for GE Plastics, and finally, Six Sigma Quality Champion - certified MBB - Manager R&D and Engineering for GE Plastics, Superabrasives Division. In this latter role, Bill was named to GE's Senior Executive Band
- 1997-1999 - After 5 years a Superabrasives, Bill transferred to GE's Lighting Division as Vice President Engineering, Quality and EHS, GE Lighting (one of the youngest to be named a corporate officer in GE's history)
- 1999-2005 - Vice President, Global Technology, GE Advanced Materials

=== Dow Chemical Company ===
- July 2005 - Joined Dow Chemical as Corporate Vice President and Chief Technology Officer During his Dow tenure he rose to the rank of Executive Vice President (effective February 2008). His responsibilities included leading Dow's Venture Capital, New Business Development, and Licensing activities. In addition, he served as a member of the Board of Directors for the Dow Corning Corporation, the Dow AgroScience's Members Committee and the Dow Foundation Board of Directors. He sponsored for development of the Dow Safety Academy.
- July 2013 - Announced retirement from Dow Chemical effective January 1, 2014.

=== University of Wisconsin ===
- January 2014 - joined University of Wisconsin-Madison, as Research Professor of Chemical and Biological Engineering, later promoted to a Professor of Practice, an Honorary Fellow of the Chemistry Department, and Sr. Scientist of the Wisconsin Energy Institute.
