= Frederiksberg Gymnasium =

Coordinates: 55°40′50″N 12°31′52″E

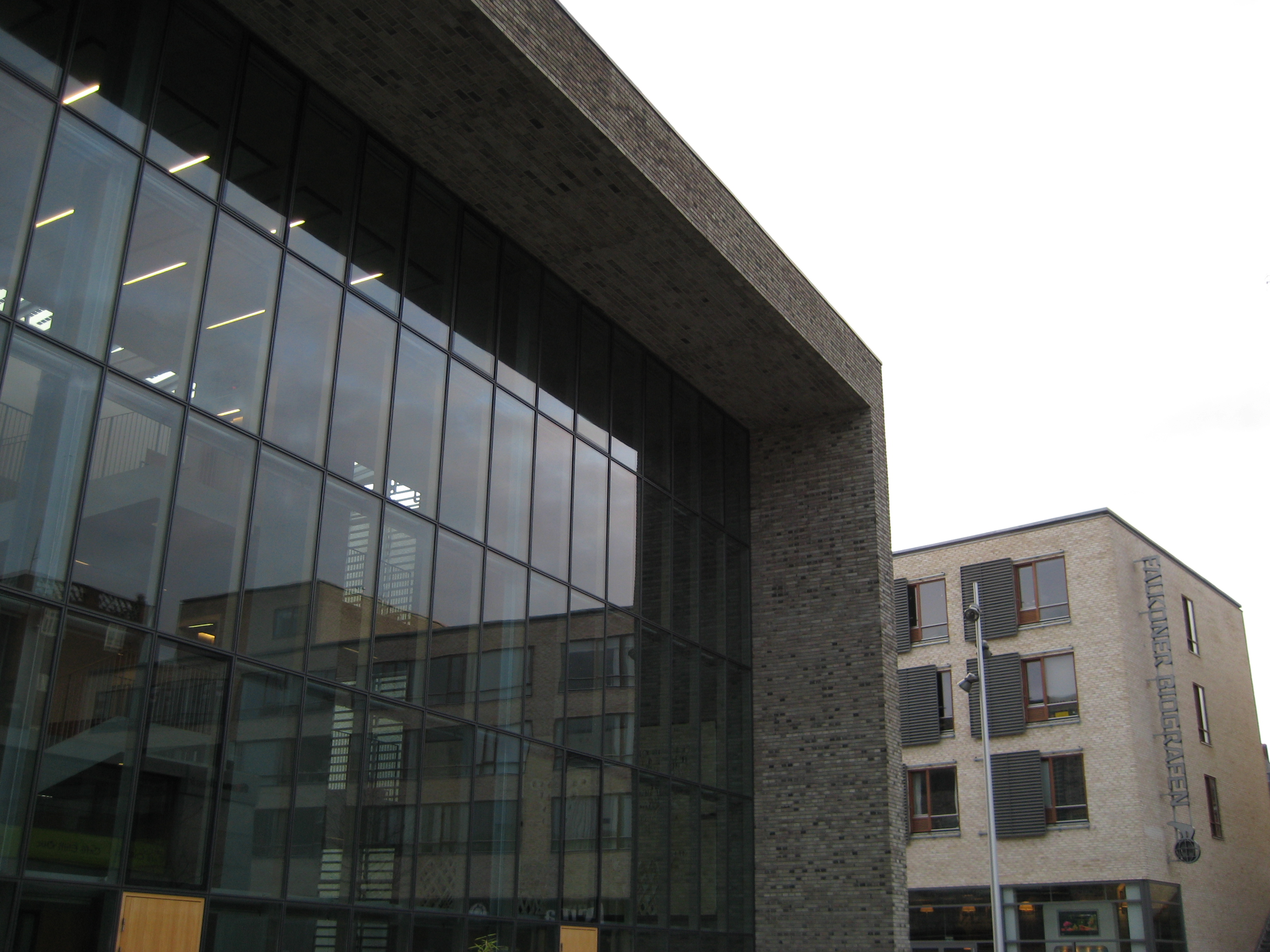
- Copenhagen, Denmark

Information
- Type: public gymnasium
- Founded: 1879
- Director: Maja Bødtcher-Hansen
- Staff: 80
- Enrollment: 650
- Website: https://www.frberg-gym.dk/

Frederiksberg Gymnasium is an upper secondary school (Danish gymnasium) in the Frederiksberg district of Copenhagen, Denmark. Its current building, located just off Falkoner Allé, was inaugurated in 2004 to a design by Henning Larsen Architects. The school has 650 students.

== History ==
Originally a private boys school, the school was founded in 1879 as Villakvarterets Forberedelses- og Realskole. Already the next year changed its name to Frederiksberg Latin- og Realskole and then again in 1907 to Frederiksberg Gymnasium. Frederiksberg Municipality took over the school in 1917 and in 1946 it was opened to female students.

The school moved to Niels Ebbesens Vej and in 2004 it moved into its current building at Falkoner Plads.

== Building ==
The school is located at an urban space which was created as part of the city's plan for the area around Frederiksberg Metro Station. Fifty metres wide and three storeys tall, the glazed front opens to the school's assembly hall from where wide staircases give access to the basement and two upper floor. The two top floors offer a flexible teaching environment with a mixture of open and more closed rooms and visual contact across corridors and interior garden spaces. There are terraces facing the interior courtyard. The basement contains gyms and flex rooms.

== Prominent alumni ==
- 1895: Holger Scheuermann, surgeon
- 1900: Kristian Middelboe, footballer
- 1905: Nils Middelboe, footballer
- 1907: Carl Theodor Dreyer, filmmaker
- 1907: Axel Salto, ceramist
- 1910: Frode Lund Hvalkof, officer and World War II resistance fighter
- 1916: Henry Skjær, opera singer
- 1927: Palle Lauring, writer and historian
- 1931: Haldor Topsøe, civil engineer and founder of Haldor Topsøe A/S
- 1932: Sejr Volmer-Sørensen, actor
- 1941: Erik Koch Michelsen, World War II resistance fighter
- 1947: Bent Melchior, Chief Rabbi
- 1948: Bent Rold Andersen, politician
- 1949: Uffe Harder, writer
- 1950: Erling Oxdam, politician
- 1955: Christian U. Jensen, mathematician
- 1961: Per Stig Møller, politician
- 1964: Mogens Lykketoft, politician
- 1968: Roald Als, caricaturist
- 1970: Søren Rislund, comedian
- 1970: Jan Monrad, comedian
- 1976: Peter Høeg, writer
- 1986: Mads Lebech, mayor
- 2006: Freja Beha Erichsen, model
