= Annual Review of Chemical and Biomolecular Engineering =

- Discipline: Chemical engineering, molecular biology
- Language: English
- Edited by: Michael F. Doherty; Rachel A. Segalman

Publication details
- History: 2010–present, 16 years old
- Publisher: Annual Reviews (US)
- Frequency: Annually
- Open access: Subscribe to Open
- Impact factor: 13.1 (2025)

Standard abbreviations
- ISO 4: Annu. Rev. Chem. Biomol. Eng.

Indexing
- CODEN: ARCBCY
- ISSN: 1947-5438 (print); 1947-5446 (web)
- LCCN: 2009202328
- OCLC no.: 313256617

Links
- Journal homepage

Annual Review of Chemical and Biomolecular Engineering is an annual peer-reviewed scientific journal published by Annual Reviews (AR), covering chemical and biomolecular engineering. The co-editors are Michael F. Doherty and Rachel A. Segalman. As of 2026, Journal Citation Reports, gives the journal an impact factor of 13.1.

== History ==
The Annual Review of Chemical and Biomolecular Engineering was first published in 2010 by Annual Reviews (AR), a nonprofit organization whose stated mission is to synthesize knowledge "for the progress of science and the benefit of society." Its founding editor was John Prausnitz. In 2018, Prausnitz was succeeded by Michael F. Doherty and Rachel A. Segalman as co-editors. Though it was initially published in print, as of 2021 it is only published electronically. As of 2023, it is being published as open access, under the Subscribe to Open model.

== Scope and indexing ==
The Annual Review of Chemical and Biomolecular Engineering defines its scope as covering significant developments relevant to chemical engineering. It includes disciplines such as applied chemistry and biology, physics, and engineering with a focus on the development of chemical products and processes. As of 2026, Journal Citation Reports lists the journal's impact factor as 13.1, ranking it fifth of 77 journal titles in the category "Chemistry, Applied" and eleventh of 183 titles in "Engineering, Chemical". It is abstracted and indexed in Scopus, Science Citation Index Expanded, CAB Abstracts, EMBASE, and MEDLINE, among others.

== Editorial processes ==
The Annual Review of Chemical and Biomolecular Engineering is helmed by the editor or the co-editors. The editor is assisted by the editorial committee, which includes associate editors, regular members, and occasionally guest editors. Guest members participate at the invitation of the editor, and serve terms of one year. All other members of the editorial committee are appointed by the AR board of directors and serve five-year terms. The editorial committee determines which topics should be included in each volume and solicits reviews from qualified authors. Unsolicited manuscripts are not accepted. Peer review of accepted manuscripts is undertaken by the editorial committee.

=== Current editorial board ===
As of 2022, the editorial committee consists of the two co-editors and the following members:

- Ravi S. Kane
- Linda J. Broadbelt
- Kookheon Char
- Wilfred Chen
- Lydia Contreras
- Christopher W. Jones
- Sanat K. Kumar
- Joseph B. Powell
- Irina Smirnova
- Levi T. Thompson

== See also ==
- List of engineering journals and magazines
