= Meyer Feldberg =

- Born: March 17, 1942 (age 84); Johannesburg, South Africa
- Education: University of Witwatersrand; Columbia Business School; University of Cape Town
- Occupation: Educator
- Known for: Dean of Columbia Business School; President of Illinois Institute of Technology

Meyer Feldberg (born 17 March 1942) is a former swimmer and was the dean of Columbia Business School from 1989 to 2004. He also served as the president of the Illinois Institute of Technology from 1987 to 1989.

== Biography ==
Feldberg was born in Johannesburg, South Africa. From the age of 15, he was a world class swimmer holding the South African record for the butterfly in 1958, 1959 and 1961. He represented South Africa at the 1958 British Empire and Commonwealth Games in Cardiff, Wales, reaching the final of the 110 yards butterfly event.

He obtained a Bachelor of Arts in political science from the University of Witwatersrand in 1962, a Master of Business Administration from Columbia University in 1965, and a Ph.D. in Management Strategy from the University of Cape Town in 1968.

In 1972, Feldberg was appointed the Dean of University of Cape Town's Graduate School of Business. In 1979, he became an associate dean at Northwestern University's business school. Shortly thereafter, Feldberg was appointed dean of Tulane University's school of business. In 1987, he became president of the Illinois Institute of Technology. In 1989, he was appointed Dean of Columbia Business School, stepping down from that position in 2004. He served on the boards of several major corporations -- Macy's, Primedia (now Rent Group), Revlon, Sappi, Select Medical, and UBS. In 2007 the Feldberg Fellowship was created in his honor.

Academic offices
Preceded by Thomas Lyle Martin, Jr.	President of the Illinois Institute of Technology; 1987–1989	Succeeded by Henry R. Linden
