= Rachel A. Segalman =

American chemical engineer

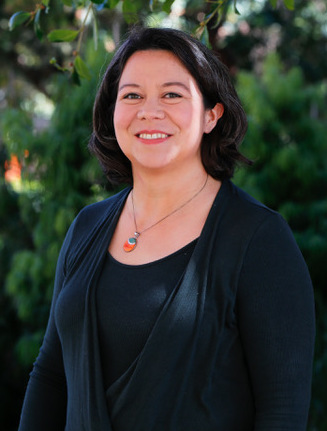
- Born: 1975 (age 50–51); Madison, Wisconsin

Academic background
- Education: University of Texas at Austin; University of California, Santa Barbara
- Thesis: Topographic control of block copolymer order (2002)
- Doctoral advisor: Edward J. Kramer

Academic work
- Institutions: University of California, Santa Barbara
- Website: www.segalman.mrl.ucsb.edu/rachel

Rachel A. Segalman is the Vice Chancellor for Research at University of California, Santa Barbara (UCSB). She is also the Edward Noble Kramer Distinguished Professor with appointments in the departments of Chemical Engineering, Materials, and Chemistry and BioChemistry. Her laboratory works on semiconducting block polymers, polymeric ionic liquids, and hybrid thermoelectric materials. She is the associate director of the Center for Materials for Water Energy System and co-editor of the Annual Review of Chemical and Biomolecular Engineering.

== Early life and education ==
Segalman was born in 1975 in Madison, Wisconsin. Her family moved to Albuquerque, New Mexico, where as a high schooler she did research at Sandia National Laboratories. She is a third generation female chemical scientist.

Segalman studied chemical engineering at University of Texas at Austin (UT). She graduated with a bachelor's degree in chemical engineering in 1998. She moved UCSB for her graduate studies, where she received her Ph.D. in 2002. At UCSB she worked under the supervision of Edward J. Kramer. Her research thesis was on controlling long range order in block copolymer thin films. After completing her Ph.D., Segalman was a Chateaubriand postdoctoral fellow at the Ecole Européenne de Chimie, Polymères et Matériaux working under Georges Hadziioannou.

== Research and career ==
In 2004 Segalman was appointed as the Charles Wilke Assistant Professor of Chemical Engineering at University of California, Berkeley, and a Faculty Research scientist at Lawrence Berkeley National Laboratory (LBL) Materials Science Division. In 2013 she was appointed as the acting director of LBL Materials Science Division.

Segalman was recruited to UCSB in 2014 as the Kramer Professor of Materials in the Departments of Chemical Engineering and Materials. The same year she was also appointed as the chair of the Department of Chemical Engineering and Warren and Katherine Schlinger Professor of Chemical Engineering. She is the associate director of the Center for Materials for Water Energy System, a joint center between UCSB, LBL, and UT funded by the Department of Energy. She is co-editor of the Annual Review of Chemical and Biomolecular Engineering and serves on the Board of Directors of Annual Reviews.

Segalman's research focuses on understanding and controlling the self-assembly, structure, and properties of functional polymers. Her laboratory studies polymeric materials for applications such as thermoelectrics, photovoltaics, and anti-fouling coating for ships.

== Awards and honors ==
- 2022 Andreas Acrivos Award for Professional Progress in Chemical Engineering, American Institute of Chemical Engineers (AIChE Foundation)
- 2021 Elected member of the National Academy of Engineering
- 2019 Elected member of the American Academy of Arts and Sciences
- 2018 Elected Board of Directors, Materials Research Society
- 2016 Elected Fellow of the American Physical Society
- 2015 Journal of Polymer Science Innovation Award
- 2012 John H. Dillon Medal of the American Physical Society
- 2009 Alfred P. Sloan Fellow
- 2008 Presidential Early Career Award for Scientists and Engineers (PECASE)
- 2007 TR35: Technology Review's Top Innovators Under 35
- 2006 3M Untenured Faulty Award
- 2005 NSF CAREER Award
