= Arnold Stancell =

African American chemical engineer

Arnold Stancell is an African American chemical engineer and scholar known for his contributions to petrochemical research.

== Early life and education ==
Arnold Stancell was born on November 16, 1936 in Harlem, New York. His parents were Francis Stancell and Maria Lucas. His father was a musician and his mother was a seamstress who raised him as a single parent. Stancell went to Stuyvesant High School and attended City College of New York. In 1958, he earned a B.S. in chemical engineering with the honor of magna cum laude. He became a fellow at the Massachusetts Institute of Technology (MIT) and in 1962 became MIT’s first African American Ph.D. graduate in chemical engineering.

== Career ==
In 1962, Stancell secured a position as a researcher at Mobil Oil Company where he worked until 1970. His focus was new plastic and chemical products. His research resulted in receiving eleven patents. Stancell continued his research when he began teaching at MIT and founded a program to study plasma reactions at surfaces. In 1971, Stancell had the opportunity to accept a tenured professorship, but chose to go back to Mobil Oil Company. In 1976, as vice president of Mobil Plastics, he was instrumental in marketing a plastic film alternative to cellophane. Other positions that Stancell held in his career were vice president of the London-based Mobil Europe Marketing and Refining in 1982 and vice president of oil and natural gas Exploration and Production in 1989. After his retirement from Mobil Oil Company in 1993, he began teaching chemical engineering at Georgia Institute of Technology (Georgia Tech) in 1994 and received the title of Turner Professor of Chemical and Biomolecular Engineering in 2001. He retired from Georgia Tech in 2004.

Stancell received several acknowledgements which include the Career Achievement Award of City College of New York, the Professional Achievement Award of the National Organization for the Professional Advancement of Black Chemists and Chemical Engineers, the American Institute of Chemical Engineers National Award for Chemical Engineering Practice. He was recognized as Black Engineer of the Year in 1992, and selected as a member of the National Academy of Engineering in 1997. He became a board member of the National Academy of Engineering in 2009. He received an appointment to the Governing Board of the National Research Council in 2010. Stancell collaborated with the US Department of Interior after the 2010 BP oil spill and was appointed to the National Science Board by President Barack Obama in 2011.
