= Jeffrey Reimer =

Jeffrey Allen Reimer
- Born: Van Nuys, California
- Occupations: Chemist, academic, author and researcher
- Awards: Camille and Henry Dreyfus Teacher-Scholar Award; Award for Chemical Engineering Excellence in Academic Teaching, American Institute of Chemical Engineers (AIChE); Fellow, American Association for the Advancement of Science; Fellow, American Physical Society; Fellow, International Society of Magnetic Resonance; Alexander von Humboldt Research Award

Academic background
- Education: B.S., Chemistry; Ph.D., Chemistry
- Alma mater: University of California, Santa Barbara; California Institute of Technology

Academic work
- Institutions: University of California at Berkeley

Jeffrey Allen Reimer is an American chemist, academic, author and researcher. He is the C. Judson King Endowed Professor, a Warren and Katharine Schlinger Distinguished Professor and the chair of the chemical and biomolecular engineering department at University of California, Berkeley.

Reimer has authored over 300 publications, has been cited over 30,000 times, and has a Google Scholar H-index of 80. His research is primarily focused to generate new knowledge to deliver environmental protection, sustainability, and fundamental insights via materials chemistry, physics, and engineering. He is a recipient of the Humboldt Prize. He is the author of two books entitled, Chemical Engineering Design and Analysis: An Introduction, and Introduction to Carbon Capture and Sequestration.

Reimer is a fellow of American Association for the Advancement of Science, American Physical Society, and International Society of Magnetic Resonance, and a member of American Chemical Society and American Institute of Chemical Engineers,

== Early life and education ==
Reimer was born in Van Nuys, California. After graduating from Taft High School in 1972, he took a summer job at Universal Studies Tours, where he was a custodian, then returning to Universal Studios Amphitheater for the summer of 1973. He then received his bachelor's degree in chemistry from the University of California, Santa Barbara in 1976, and a doctorate in chemistry from California Institute of Technology in 1981.

== Career ==
Following his doctorate, Reimer served as postdoctoral fellow at IBM T.J. Watson Research Laboratories, before joining University of California at Berkeley as assistant and associate professor in 1982. He was then promoted to professor at University of California at Berkeley in 1994. Since 1984, he has also served as faculty scientist at Ernest O. Lawrence Berkeley National Laboratory, and in 2006, he held a brief appointment at RWTH Aachen University as Mercator Professor of the Deutsche Forschungsgemeinschaft.

Reimer was appointed on the executive board of Council for Chemical Research in 2012, and became a trustee of Franklin University Switzerland in 2014.

== Research ==
Reimer has worked extensively to generate new knowledge to deliver environmental protection, sustainability, and fundamental insights via materials chemistry, physics, and engineering. He established a research laboratory that focuses on a broader application of NMR and EPR spectroscopy to materials physics and chemistry.

=== Electronic Materials and Spintronics ===
Reimer and his group pioneered the use of magnetic resonance in the study of defects in thin film amorphous semiconducting thin films. He studied the distribution of hydrogen in hydrogenated amorphous silicon using multiple nuclear-magnetic-resonance techniques. He also characterized hydrogenated defects in silicon thin films and observed the light-induced changes in the local bonding environments of dopant impurities. He published a paper in 1987 and explored the usage of light in terms of controlling nuclear spins in semiconductors, and the role of these methods in context of exploiting the near-perfectly polarized electrons generated by optical processes in the host material to effectively deliver high polarization to atomic nuclei in materials such as GaAs and diamond. His work with defects in diamond began with phenomenology and has evolved, with collaborators Alex Pines and Carlos Meriles, to discovery of Landau-Zener effects associated with NV- defects in diamond, leading to extraordinary nuclear hyperpolarization.

=== Gas Separations and Metal-Organic Frameworks ===
Reimer developed materials and membranes that enable energy-efficient separation of gas mixtures, and are required in the clean use of fossil fuels and in reducing emissions from industry. His research also focused on the separations that decrease CO_{2} emissions from power plants and decrease energy consumption in gas separations used by industry and agriculture." In his paper published in 2013, he demonstrated the synthesis of metal-organic framework, self-assembled polymers, and other nanostructured materials, and also discussed their characterization at the atomic level of structure and sorbate dynamics. Furthermore, he studied the state-of-the-art of CO_{2} capture, transport, utilization and storage from a multi-scale perspective, moving from the global to molecular scales.

=== NMR Techniques and Instrumentation ===
In 2002, Reimer developed magnetic resonance (MR) sensors for pulp and paper processing applications under American Forest Products Association and DOE's Office of Industrial Technology. He also constructed a pilot-scale chip prototype instrument and sent it to sensor manufacturers for commercial development. Furthermore, he developed a high throughput NMR relaxometer that yields nanoporous materials surface area with a robotic device, and later on extended the sensor concepts in his collaboration with Alex Pines towards "outside the magnet" and "outside the coil" detection.

== Awards and honors ==
- 1985 - NSF Presidential Young Investigator Award
- 1987- AT&T Foundation Award
- 1987 - Camille and Henry Dreyfus Teacher-Scholar Award
- 1997 - Award for Chemical Engineering Excellence in Academic Teaching, American Institute of Chemical Engineers (AIChE)
- 1998 - The Donald Sterling Noyce Prize for Excellence in Undergraduate Teaching, UC Berkeley
- 2000 & 2015 - Chemical Engineering Departmental Teaching Award, UC Berkeley
- 2002 - R. W. Vaughan Lecturer, Rocky Mountain Conference on Applied Spectroscopy
- 2002 - Distinguished Teaching Award, U.C. Berkeley
- 2008 - Otto M. Smith Lectureship, Oklahoma State University
- 2006 –2011, 2013 - Warren & Katharine Schlinger Distinguished Professor, UC Berkeley
- 2009 - Fellow, American Association for the Advancement of Science
- 2010 - Fellow, American Physical Society
- 2011- Chair, Gordon Conference on Magnetic Resonance
- 2012 - C. Judson King Endowed Chair in Chemical and Biomolecular Engineering
- 2012 - EAS Award for Outstanding Achievement in Magnetic Resonance
- 2013 - Fellow, International Society of Magnetic Resonance
- 2015-16 - Alexander von Humboldt Research Award, RWTH Aachen, Germany
- 2022 - 69th Annual G.N. Lewis Lectureship and Awardee
- 2022 - The Berkeley Citation Award
- 2023 - UC Berkeley College of Chemistry 2023 Commencement Speech
- 2023 - AIChE's Warren K. Lewis Award for ChE education

== Bibliography ==
=== Books ===
- Chemical Engineering Design and Analysis: An Introduction (1998) ISBN 9781107494084
- Introduction To Carbon Capture And Sequestration (2014) ISBN 9781783263288

=== Selected articles ===
- Larsen, S. C., Aylor, A., Bell, A. T., & Reimer, J. A. (1994). Electron paramagnetic resonance studies of copper ion-exchanged ZSM-5. The Journal of Physical Chemistry, 98(44), 11533–11540.
- Lobree, L. J., Hwang, I. C., Reimer, J. A., & Bell, A. T. (1999). Investigations of the State of Fe in H–ZSM-5. Journal of Catalysis, 186(2), 242–253.
- Kong, X., Deng, H., Yan, F., Kim, J., Swisher, J. A., Smit, B., ... & Reimer, J. A. (2013). Mapping of functional groups in metal-organic frameworks. Science, 341(6148), 882–885.
- McDonald, T. M., Mason, J. A., Kong, X., Bloch, E. D., Gygi, D., Dani, A., ... & Long, J. R. (2015). Cooperative insertion of CO 2 in diamine-appended metal-organic frameworks. Nature, 519(7543), 303–308.
- Bui, M., Adjiman, C. S., Bardow, A., Anthony, E. J., Boston, A., Brown, S., ... & Mac Dowell, N. (2018). Carbon capture and storage (CCS): the way forward. Energy & Environmental Science, 11(5), 1062–1176.
