= Lewis Collens =

American university president

Lewis Morton Collens

President of Illinois Institute of Technology
- In office 1 June 1990 – 1 August 2007
- Preceded by: Henry R. Linden
- Succeeded by: John L. Anderson

Personal details
- Born: c. 1938
- Spouse: Marjorie
- Children: Steven, son.

Lewis Morton Collens served as president of the Illinois Institute of Technology from June 1, 1990, to August 1, 2007. Prior to that, he served as dean of the Chicago-Kent College of Law from 1974 until 1990. During his tenure as Law School dean, he was credited with elevating Chicago-Kent from "not a highly regarded law school" to the point where it was named "foremost 'up and coming law school' by US News & World Report" at the time of his departure.

In addition to his position as IIT's president, Collens serves as a director of Dean Foods Company, AMSTED Industries, Alion Science and Technology Corp. and The Colson Group, Inc. Collens has also served in various leadership roles for The Partnership for New Communities, Leadership Greater Chicago, The Economic Club of Chicago, Association of Independent Technological Universities, National Association of Independent Colleges and Universities, The Latin School of Chicago, and the Mayors Council of Technology Advisors.

Collens graduated from the University of Chicago Law School in 1966.

He and his wife Marjorie, former Evanston alderman and community volunteer, were married in 1962. They had one son, Steven, CEO of healthcare technology incubator Matter. Marjorie died December 10, 2015.

Academic offices
Preceded by Henry R. Linden	President of the Illinois Institute of Technology; 1990–2007	Succeeded by John L. Anderson
