= Council for Chemical Research =

- Formation: 1979
- Headquarters: Washington, DC
- Location: United States
- Chair: Eric K. Lin
- President: Eric K. Lin
- Key people: Jill Russell (Membership Director)
- Website: www.ccrhq.org

Council for Chemical Research is an organization based in Washington, DC, whose membership represents the U.S. chemical research enterprise. CCR was formed in 1979 to promote cooperation in basic research and encourage high-quality education in the chemical sciences and chemical engineering. CCR's membership currently comprises more than 120 companies, universities, and government laboratories with a combined R&D budget of more than $7 billion.

In 2016, the CCR was reorganized under the American Institute of Chemical Engineers.(AIChE)

== Origins ==
The Council for Chemical Research was created in 1979 when Malcolm Pruitt, then VP for research at The Dow Chemical Company, convened the first meeting of research executives from the nation's major chemical companies and research universities. The goal was to improve trust and collaboration between the public and private sector research communities. The association was incorporated in 1980 as the "Chemical Research Council, Inc." The members of the Founding Board were M.E. Pruitt (Dow Chemical), E.C. Galloway (Stauffer Chemical), S.A. Heininger (Monsanto), J.L. Kice (Texas Tech University), C.J. King (UC Berkeley), A.L. Kwiram (Washington), J.R. Lovett (Air Products and Chemicals), J.F. Mathis (Exxon), W.M. Risen Jr. (Brown University), K.A. Smith (MIT) and L.J. Thomas (Eastman Kodak).

CCR is a 501(c)(3) non-profit organization.

CCR has four membership categories: Industrial, Academic, Government Labs, and Affiliates.

== Mission and activities ==
CCR's mission is "Advancing Chemical Innovation Through Collaboration and Advocacy."

CCR serves as a catalyst and partner for initiatives in the field of chemical research, such as the Center for Process Analytical Chemistry and Chemical Industry Vision 2020.

CCR produces and sponsors studies such as Measuring Up: Research and Development Counts for the Chemical Industry and Measure for Measure: Chemical R&D Powers the U.S. Innovation Engine.

CCR holds an annual meeting, an annual New Industrial Chemistry and Engineering Conference (NIChE), and workshops on topics such as Intellectual Property Issues.

CCR works with the US President, US Congress and federal agencies and research labs on public policy issues within its area of expertise, and writes position statements annually on the budget for federal agencies which fund research in the chemical sciences.

=== Awards ===
CCR's Malcolm Pruitt Award recognizes, "...outstanding contributions to the progress of chemistry and chemical engineering by promotion of mutually beneficial interactions among universities, the chemical industry, and government."

CCR's Collaboration Success Award recognizes, "...a collaborative team that has made outstanding contributions to the progress of chemistry-related science and/or engineering."

CCR's Diversity Award recognizes, "...an individual who has directly impacted organizational ability to advance and promote diversity..."

=== Action networks ===
Much of CCR's work is accomplished by volunteer representatives who participate in Action Networks. Action Networks are knowledge-action communities of CCR members and colleagues, led by a three-person team of government, industry, and university volunteer leaders. Each Action Network develops and executes the activities which advance their goal.

There are 3 Action Networks:

CCR Action Network to Advance Research Investment
CCR Action Network to Advocate Research Collaboration
CCR Action Network to Enrich Graduate Education

== CCR Chairs ==
- 2016 Kelly Sullivan
- 2015 Jeffrey Reimer
- 2014 Eric Lin
- 2013 Marc Donohue
- 2012 Wayne Ranbom
- 2011 Terry Ring
- 2010 Seth Snyder
- 2009 Gregory Girolami
- 2008 John McDermott
- 2007 Joan Brennecke
- 2006 Randolph Guschl
- 2005 Robert Armstrong
- 2004 Alan P. Sylwester
- 2003 Esin Gulari
- 2002 Richard M. Gross
- 2001 Alexis T. Bell
- 2000 David R. Rea
- 1999 Jean H. Futrell
- 1998 Gary E. McGraw
- 1997 Ronald W. Rousseau
- 1996 Thomas A. Manuel
- 1995 Harry A. Morrison
- 1994 L. Louis Hegedus
- 1993 Thomas F. Edgar
- 1992 Roy D. Gerard
- 1991 J. Ivan Legg
- 1990 Herbert S. Eleuterio
- 1989 C. Judson King
- 1988 E. Charles Galloway
- 1987 Paul G. Gassman
- 1986 Klaus L. Mai
- 1985 Kenneith B. Bischoff
- 1984 W. James Porter
- 1983 Alvin L. Kwiram
- 1982 Malcolm E. Pruitt
- 1981 Malcolm E. Pruitt
