= İlhan Aksay =

American materials scientist

İlhan Arif Aksay (born 1944) is an American materials scientist. He is the Pomeroy and Betty Perry Smith Professor in Engineering and Emeritus Professor of Chemical and Biological Engineering within the School of Engineering and Applied Science at Princeton University, Princeton, New Jersey, United States

In 2010, Aksay was elected into the National Academy of Engineering for advances in ceramic processing methods, biologically inspired materials processing, and field-induced layering of colloidal crystals.

== Education and academic career ==
Aksay earned his B.Sc. (1967) in Ceramic Engineering at the University of Washington, Seattle, and his M.Sc. (1969) and Ph.D. (1973) in Materials Science and Engineering at the University of California, Berkeley under the supervision of Joseph Adam Pask. Prior to joining Princeton in 1992, his teaching and research affiliations included appointments at the University of Washington, Seattle (1983–92); University of California, Los Angeles (1981–83); the Middle East Technical University, Ankara, Turkey (1975–81); and Xerox Corporation, Webster Research Center, Webster, New York (1973–75).

=== Research ===
His research activities include the processing science of materials with emphasis on bio-inspired methods of self-assembly, thermodynamics and phase equilibria, diffusion and structural studies in ionic systems. His most recent work on functionalized graphene produced through thermal reduction of graphene oxide demonstrated many advantages in technologies ranging from nanocomposites to electrochemical devices for chemical sensing, energy harvesting, and energy storage.

== Awards and achievements ==
Aksay is a member of the U.S. National Academy of Engineering, NAE (2010), the Science Academy, Turkey (2012), and the U.S. National Academy of Inventors, NAI (2014). He is also a Fellow of the American Association for the Advancement of Science (AAAS), the American Ceramic Society, and an honorary member of the Materials Research Society - Japan. He received the Richard M. Fulrath (1987) and the Edward C. Henry (2000) Awards of the American Ceramic Society, the Charles M. A. Stine Award of the American Institute of Chemical Engineers (1997), and the Turkish National Medal of Science (Tübitak) (2001). In recognition of his research and efforts in promoting technology transfer, he was named the Puget Sound (Washington State) Engineering Council's 1988 Academic Engineer of the Year.
