= Michael F. Doherty =

British chemical engineer

- Born: 1951 (age 73–74)
- Citizenship: British
- Education: Imperial College London; Trinity College, Cambridge
- Partner: Margaret H. Ricks
- Children: 2
- Scientific career
- Institutions: University of Minnesota; University of Massachusetts Amherst; University of California, Santa Barbara

Michael Francis Doherty (born September 11, 1951) is a British chemical engineer. He is the Duncan & Suzanne Mellichamp Chair in Process Systems Engineering at the University of California, Santa Barbara.

In 2016, he was elected a member of the National Academy of Engineering for the design of methods for complex distillation and crystallization processes.

== Early life and education ==
Michael Francis Doherty was born in 1951 and grew up in Manchester, England. He attended Imperial College London for a bachelor's degree in chemical engineering in 1973. He then attended Trinity College, Cambridge for his PhD, also in chemical engineering, graduating in 1977.

== Career ==
Michael F. Doherty worked as a postdoctoral instructor for a year at the University of Minnesota after finishing his PhD in August 1976. In 1977 he began working at University of Massachusetts Amherst. In 1984, he took a sabbatical to accompany his wife as she completed her postdoctoral appointment at University of California, Berkeley. He was head of his department at UMass from 1989 to 1997. In 2000 he joined the faculty at University of California, Santa Barbara (UCSB). He was chair of his department at UCSB from 2008 to 2013 and is now the Duncan & Suzanne Mellichamp Chair in Process Systems Engineering.

Doherty researches systems engineering with a focus on crystal engineering. He is co-editor of the Annual Review of Chemical and Biomolecular Engineering.

== Awards and honors ==
In 2008 he was named one of the "One Hundred Chemical Engineers of the Modern Era" by the American Institute of Chemical Engineers. Doherty received the E. V. Murphree Award in Industrial and Engineering Chemistry from the American Chemical Society in 2012. He was elected to the National Academy of Engineering in 2016.

== Personal life ==
He met his future wife, Margaret H. Ricks, during the early 1970s and lived with her in Greenwich Village between graduating from Imperial College London and starting his PhD program. An American, she came to England in 1974; they married soon after her arrival so that she could get a work permit as the wife of a British citizen. They have two children, Sarah and Max.
