= George Edward Holbrook =

George Edward Holbrook (March 4, 1909 – February 26, 1987) was a noted American chemical engineer and a founding member of the National Academy of Engineering.

== Biography ==
Holbrook was born in St. Louis, Missouri, and studied chemical engineering at the University of Michigan where he received his BS (1931), MS (1932), and Ph.D. (1933). He then joined Du Pont, by 1939 was head of new products research at Jackson Laboratory, and in 1943 its assistant director. In 1949 Holbrook was appointed general superintendent of product development at Chambers Works, then the world's largest chemical plant. He subsequently moved to Du Pont headquarters, first as manager of process development for the Organic Chemicals business, and later as assistant director of the Development Department.

After a brief leave for government service - as deputy director and then director of the Chemical, Rubber, and Forest Products Bureau of the National Production Authority - Holbrook resumed his prior Du Pont work but also chaired Du Pont's Corporate Committee for Educational Fellowships and Grants. In 1955 he was named assistant general manager of the Organic Chemicals Department, and in 1957 general manager of the Elastomer Chemicals Department. In 1958 he was further promoted to vice president, director, and member of the executive committee.

Holbrook served on boards and committees for a number of universities, including the Carnegie Institute of Technology, University of Delaware, University of Michigan, University of Pennsylvania, University of Rochester, and Newark College. He was a member of the American Chemical Society, American Physical Society, Society of Chemical Industry, New York Academy of Sciences, Franklin Institute, American Association for the Advancement of Science, the Chemical Society (London), and honorary member of the Institute of Chemical Engineers (London), and served as president of the American Institute of Chemical Engineers in 1958.
