= Venkat Venkatasubramanian =

Indian American chemical engineer

Venkat Venkatasubramanian is the Samuel Ruben-Peter G. Viele Professor of Engineering in the Department of Chemical Engineering at Columbia University. He is also an affiliated professor in the departments of Computer Science and Industrial Engineering and Operations Research at Columbia University.

== Academic career ==
After completing his postdoctoral research with Geoffrey Hinton in the Department of Computer Science at Carnegie Mellon University in 1983–1984, Venkatasubramanian joined the faculty at Purdue University. Over his two-decade tenure at Purdue, he became the Reilly Professor of Chemical Engineering in 2011. He later joined Columbia University, where he directs the Complex Resilient Intelligent Systems Laboratory. He is also the founding co-director of the Center for the Management of Systemic Risk (CMSR), an interdisciplinary initiative involving faculty from multiple departments at Columbia.

In 2019, Venkatasubramanian was awarded the Ngee Ann Kongsi Distinguished Visiting Professorship at the National University of Singapore.

== Research and teaching ==
Venkatasubramanian specializes in complex dynamical systems, focusing on the mathematical modeling of structure, function, and behavior in various domains. His research interests span artificial intelligence (AI), systems engineering, theoretical physics, and economics, with a particular emphasis on understanding complexity and emergent behavior.

== Bibliography ==
Selected bibliography

- Advanced Knowledge Representation
- Venkatasubramanian, Venkataraman (2019). How much inequality is fair? Mathematical principles of a moral, optimal, and stable capitalist society (Paperback ed.). New York: Columbia University Press. ISBN 978-0-231-18072-6.
- Computer Aided Molecular Design: Theory and Practice. Elsevier Science, ISBN 978-0-444-54543-5

== Awards and recognition ==
- 2004–2005 Teaching for Tomorrow Fellowship Award at Purdue University.
- The Computing in Chemical Engineering Award from the American Institute of Chemical Engineers (AIChE) in 2009.
- Fellow recognition by American Institute of Chemical Engineers in 2011.
- The Research Excellence Award from Purdue University's College of Engineering in 2011.
- The inaugural Distinguished Alumni Award from Alagappa College of Technology in 2019.
- The William H. Walker Award from AIChE in 2024 for his contributions to hybrid AI modeling frameworks.
- Member, National Academy of Engineering, 2025.
