= Henry R. Linden =

American chemist and university president (1922–2009)

Henry R. Linden (February 21, 1922 – September 13, 2009) was an American chemist with a focus on energy research, president of the Institute of Gas Technology, founding president of the Gas Research Institute, and president of the Illinois Institute of Technology. Linden was elected to the National Academy of Engineering "for contributions to methods of fuel conversion and energy utilization". He was also a fellow of the American Association for the Advancement of Science, and a fellow of the American Institute of Chemical Engineers. The Chicago Sun-Times called Linden "world-renowned authority in energy research". The Illinois Institute of Technology called him "an icon at Illinois Institute of Technology (IIT) and global authority in energy research".

Academic offices
Preceded by Meyer Feldberg	President of the Illinois Institute of Technology; 1989–1990	Succeeded by Lewis Collens
