= Flemming Topsøe =

Danish mathematician

Flemming Topsøe (born 25 August 1938) is a Danish mathematician, and is emeritus in the mathematics department of the University of Copenhagen. He is the author of several mathematical science works, among them works about analysis, probability theory and information theory. He was born in Aarhus, son of the engineer Haldor Topsøe (1913–2013) and great-grandson of the crystallographer and chemist Haldor Topsøe (1842–1935). He is the older brother of the engineer Henrik Topsøe (born 1944).

Topsøe completed his magister degree in mathematics at Aarhus University in 1962. After spending a year at the University of Cambridge in 1965–1966, he finished his PhD in 1971 at the University of Copenhagen. His thesis was titled Topology and Measure, and was later published by Springer. He was leader of the Danish Mathematical Society 1978–1982 and dynamic leader of Euromath 1983–1998, a great project about expansion of Internet-based services to mathematics societies in Europe and Russia. He received a Hlavka memorial medal in 1992 and a B. Bolzano honorary medal in 2006 of the Czechoslovak Academy of Sciences for his mathematical contributions.

== Books ==
- Topsøe, Flemming (1990). Spontaneous phenomena: a mathematical analysis. Translated by Stillwell, John. Oxford: Elsevier Science. ISBN 978-0-323-16038-4. OCLC 843202655.
- Topsøe, Flemming (1973). Informationsteori (in Danish). Gyldendal. ISBN 978-87-00-96231-6. OCLC 466446962.
- Topsøe, Flemming (1970). Topology and measure. Berlin New York: Springer-Verlag. ISBN 978-3-540-36284-5. OCLC 295009759.
