= Augustus Braun Kinzel =

American metallurgist (1900–1987)

Augustus Braun Kinzel (July 26, 1900 – October 23, 1987) was a noted American metallurgist and first president of the National Academy of Engineering.

== Biography ==
Kinzel was born in New York City. He received his A.B. in mathematics from Columbia University (1919), B.S. in engineering from the Massachusetts Institute of Technology (1921), and D. Met. Ing. and Sc.D. from the University of Nancy, France (1922, 1933). His employment started in 1919 at the General Electric Laboratories in Pittsfield, Massachusetts. He joined Union Carbide Research Laboratories in 1926 as a research metallurgist, where he subsequently served as chief metallurgist starting in 1931, vice-president (1945), and president (1948). He subsequently served as director of research for the Union Carbide Corporation (starting 1954), and vice-president of research (1955). In later years he was president and chief executive officer the Salk Institute for Biological Studies.

During World War II he held key advisory posts for ordnance, and led the metals branch of the Technical Industrial Intelligence Committee in Europe. After the war, he served on the Defense Science Board and the Naval Research Advisory Committee, and as consultant to the Los Alamos, Oak Ridge, Argonne, and Brookhaven National Laboratories, and the Knolls Atomic Power Laboratory.

Kinzel was active in professional organizations, notably as the president of the American Institute of Mining, Metallurgical, and Petroleum Engineers (1958) and chairman of the Division of Engineering and Industrial Research of the National Research Council (1960). He was a founding member of the National Academy of Engineering, and a member of the National Academy of Sciences, the American Philosophical Society, and the MIT Corporation. He was a trustee of the California Institute of Technology, the Jet Propulsion Laboratory, and a member of the board of System Development Corporation, Beckman Instrument Company, etc. He was also the recipient of many distinguished service awards such as the illustrious IRI Medal from the Industrial Research Institute.
