= Lydia Contreras =

American chemical engineer

- Born: Santo Domingo, Dominican republic
- Education: Cornell University; Princeton University
- Awards: Elected to American Institute of microbiology, 2023; American Chemical Society (ACS); Biotechnology Division Young Investigator Award, 2020; Elected to The American Institute for Medical and Biological Engineering, 2019; Mellichamp Emerging Leader Lecture, 2018; Cornell Chemical Engineering Distinguished Alumni Award, 2018; Biotechnology and Bioengineering Daniel I.C. Wang Award, 2016; Society of Hispanic Professional Engineering (SHPE) Young Investigator Award, 2015; Health and Environmental Institute (HEI) Walter E. Rosenblith New Investigator, 2015; Norman Hackerman Advanced Research Program (NHARP) Early Career Program, 2014; NSF CAREER Award, 2013; Air Force Office of Scientific Research (AFOSR) Young Investigator, 2013; Warfield Center Faculty Teaching Award, 2013; Defense Threat Reduction Agency (DTRA) Young Investigator, 2011; Keystone Symposia Fellow on Molecular and Cellular Biology, 2011
- Scientific career
- Workplaces: University of Texas at Austin

Lydia Contreras is a full professor at the University of Texas at Austin. She is an American chemical engineer most notable for her work on biomolecular engineering, genetics, and drug discovery.

== Education ==
Contreras earned her B.S.E. in Chemical Engineering in 2003 from Princeton University and her Ph.D. in Chemical and Biomolecular Engineering in 2008 from Cornell University.

== Academic career ==
Contreras is known for her experimental and computational work on understanding molecular features that lead to the interaction of RNAs and proteins. Her work has led to the development of new methods and understanding of, for instance, the capacity of RNA nucleotides to establish intermolecular RNA interactions via high-throughput characterization of RNA interfaces.

Following the completion of her PhD, she served as an NIH Postdoctoral Fellow in the Division of Genetics and Bioinformatics, Wadsworth Center at the New York State Department of Health from 2008 to 2010. She then served as a visiting Postdoctoral Fellow in the Department of Biochemistry at the Max F. Perutz Laboratories in Vienna before she began serving as an assistant professor at the University of Texas at Austin. In 2017, she was promoted to Associate Professor in the department of chemical engineering.
