= Haldor Topsøe (1842–1935) =

Danish chemist

Haldor Frederik Axel Topsøe (29 April 1842 in Skælskør, Slagelse Municipality, Denmark – 31 December 1935 in Frederiksberg, Denmark) was a Danish chemist and crystallographer. He is grandfather of the engineer Haldor Topsøe (1913–2013) who has got his name from his grandfather, and great-grandfather of the mathematician Flemming Topsøe (born 25 August 1938) and the engineer Henrik Topsøe (born 10 August 1944).

Topsøe took Magisterkonferens in chemistry in 1866 and doctorate for a chemical-crystallographical work of selenium-sour salts. He worked as assistant at the Natural History Museum 1863–1867 and at the chemistry laboratory of University of Copenhagen 1867–1873. In 1872, he received a gold medal of Royal Danish Academy of Sciences and Letters, of which he was member from 1877, for a great crystallographical-optical work together with the physicist Christian Christiansen (1843–1917). He worked as chemistry teacher at the Royal Danish Military Academy 1876–1902 where he founded a new laboratory where he continued his science works. In 1884 he participated in the oceanographic expedition to west Greenland on the gunboat HDMS Fylla. He was member of the Norwegian Academy of Science and Letters from 1892.

Topsøe became commander of the Order of the Dannebrog in 1880.
