= John L. Anderson =

American academic

John Anderson
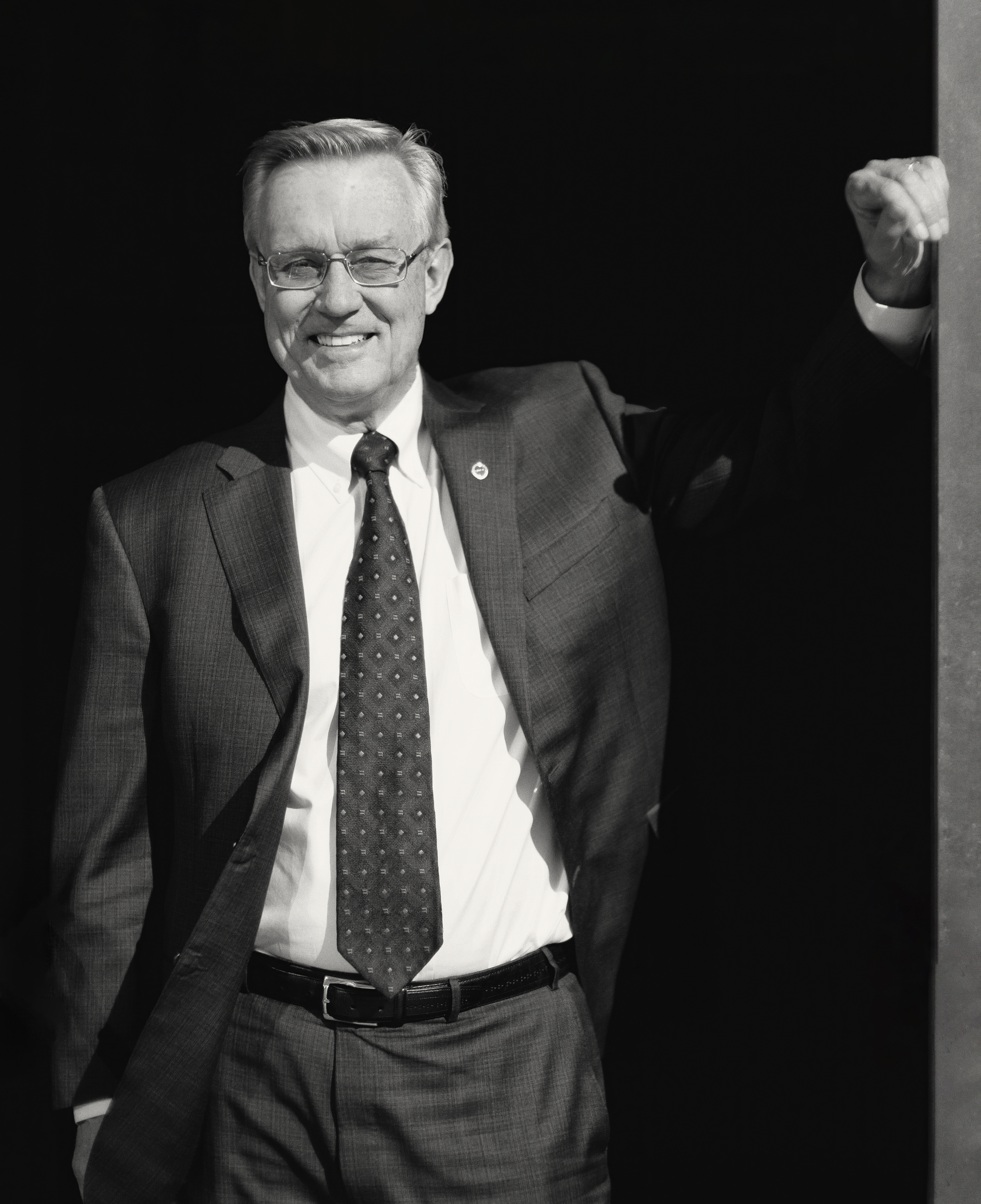

Personal details
- Born: John Leonard Anderson; 1945 (age 79–80)
- Education: University of Delaware (BS); University of Illinois, Urbana-Champaign (MS, PhD)

John Leonard Anderson (born 1945) is the former president of the National Academy of Engineering. He was a professor of chemical engineering, who served as the eighth president of Illinois Institute of Technology. Prior to his appointment at IIT, Anderson held positions in academia at various institutions, serving both as the provost of Case Western Reserve University and the dean of the College of Engineering at Carnegie Mellon University.

== Biography ==
Anderson was born and grew up in Wilmington, Delaware. He attended the University of Delaware where he received a B.S. in chemical engineering in 1967. He then went on to obtain an M.S. in chemical engineering, and completed a Ph.D. in 1971, also in chemical engineering, from the University of Illinois at Urbana-Champaign.

Anderson was part of Cornell University's faculty for five years, where he served as an assistant professor of chemical engineering. On 1 September 1976, Anderson left Cornell to begin a 28-year career at Carnegie Mellon. Starting out as an associate professor, he soon became director of the Biomedical Engineering Program. He continued to weave through the ranks at Carnegie Mellon before being conferred as a university professor on 1 July 1994, the highest rank for a professor offered at that institution. Two years later, he was appointed dean of the college of engineering. He was in that position for eight years before leaving the university on 1 April 2004 to become provost, university vice president, and professor of chemical engineering at Case Western Reserve.

He was elected to the National Academy of Engineering in 1992 for contributions to the understanding of colloidal hydrodynamics and membrane transport phenomena. He was also elected as a Fellow of the American Academy of Arts and Sciences in 2005.

Anderson served at Case Western Reserve from 2004 until 2007. He and the university president Edward M. Hundert lost no-confidence vote March 2, 2006, by the College of Arts and Sciences faculty, by 131–44 against Hundert and 97–68 against Anderson. He joined IIT on August 1, 2007, as president and professor of chemical engineering. He stepped down as president eight years later, and he was elected president of the National Academy of Engineering in 2019 for a six-year term.

== Awards and accomplishments ==
Anderson was appointed to National Science Board in 2014 and received the National Engineering Award from the American Association of Engineering Societies in 2012.

He was elected Fellow of the American Association for the Advancement of Science and awarded the Acrivos Professional Progress Award from the American Institute of Chemical Engineers in 1989.

Anderson was a Fellow of the John Simon Guggenheim Memorial Foundation from 1982 to 1983.

He has received honorary doctorates from the University of Delaware, Illinois Institute of Technology, Rensselaer Polytechnic Institute, and Case Western Reserve University.

Academic offices
| Preceded by Lewis Collens | President of the Illinois Institute of Technology; 2007–2015 | Succeeded by Alan Cramb |
| Preceded by ??? | Provost and Vice President of Case Western Reserve University; 2004–2007 | Succeeded by W. A. "Bud" Baeslack III |
| Preceded by ??? | Dean of the Carnegie Institute of Technology; 1996–2004 | Succeeded by Pradeep Khosla |
