= Peter T. Cummings =

Australian-American chemical engineer

- Born: Australia
- Education: University of Melbourne; University of Newcastle
- Engineering career
- Discipline: Chemical engineering
- Institutions: Vanderbilt University

Peter T. Cummings is an Australian-American chemical engineer, currently the John R. Hall Professor of Chemical Engineering and associate dean for research for the school of engineering at Vanderbilt University. He formerly held positions at the University of Virginia and the University of Tennessee, Knoxville.

Between 1994 and 2013, Cummings was associated with the Oak Ridge National Laboratory (ORNL). He was one of the four researchers who wrote the proposal to establish ORNL's Center for Nanophase Materials Sciences Division (CNMS). From 2007 to 2013, he served as the principal scientist for the CNMS.

His research interests include statistical mechanics, computational materials engineering, and theoretical nanoscience using molecular modeling techniques such as molecular dynamics and Monte Carlo simulations.
