= C. Judson King =

American chemical engineer and educator

- Born: September 27, 1934 (age 92); Fort Monmouth, New Jersey
- Occupations: Chemical engineer, researcher, administrator and educator.
- Awards: Clark Kerr Award (2018)

Academic background
- Education: B.E., Chemical Engineering; S.M., Chemical Engineering; Sc.D., Chemical Engineering
- Alma mater: Yale University; Massachusetts Institute of Technology
- Doctoral advisor: J. Edward Vivian

Academic work
- Institutions: University of California
- Notable works: Separation Processes; The University of California: Creating, Nurturing, and Maintaining Academic Quality in a Public University Setting

C. Judson King is an American chemical engineer, researcher, administrator and educator. He is professor emeritus at University of California, Berkeley, and UC universitywide provost and senior vice president of academic affairs, emeritus, at University of California. He is the former director of Center for Studies in Higher Education and the former dean of College of Chemistry at UC Berkeley.

King's research has been focused in two areas: chemical engineering and higher education. In the area of chemical engineering, he has conducted considerable research on spray drying, freeze drying, and removal and recovery of organic pollutants from wastewater streams. In the area of higher education he has written about university structure and governance, innovation in universities, and engineering education. He has written three books and over 250 scientific articles. He holds 13 patents.

King has received many awards for his contribution to the field of chemical engineering. He was elected to the National Academy of Engineering in 1981 for distinguished contributions to freeze-drying technology, systematic studies of chemical-process synthesis, and chemical engineering education. He became a fellow of the American Institute of Chemical Engineers in 1983, and a fellow of the American Association for the Advancement of Science in 1993. In 2009, the American Institute of Chemical Engineers named him one of the 100 Chemical Engineers of the Modern Era.

== Early life and education ==
King was born in 1934 in an army family. Since childhood, King enjoyed hiking and camping. He graduated from Episcopal High School in Alexandria, Virginia. He received a B.E. in chemical engineering from Yale University in 1956. He then entered Massachusetts Institute of Technology, where he received S.M. in chemical engineering in 1958 and Sc.D. in chemical engineering in 1960, under the supervision of J. Edward Vivian.

== Career ==
King joined Massachusetts Institute of Technology in 1959 as an assistant professor of chemical engineering to become director of the School of Chemical Engineering Practice station at the Exxon (then Esso) Bayway refinery in New Jersey.

In 1963, King joined University of California, Berkeley as assistant professor of chemical engineering, becoming associate professor in 1966 and full professor in 1969. From 1967 to 1972, he served as the vice chairman of Department of Chemical Engineering. He then served as the chairman of the department from 1972 to 1981. In 1981, King was appointed as the dean of College of Chemistry and later in 1987 as the provost of the Professional Schools and Colleges, a position in which he served until 1994. At the time of his appointment, King was the first chemical engineer to become dean of the College of Chemistry at Berkeley.

King was appointed the vice provost for research for the entire nine-campus University of California in 1994. In 1995 he became provost and senior vice president for academic affairs, again university-wide. During his time as UC provost, King helped launch the new, tenth UC campus at Merced, the California Digital Library, and eScholarship, the University of California's open access, electronic repository for publications by UC authors. He returned to UC Berkeley in 2004 as the director of Center for Studies in Higher Education, serving in this position for a full decade until 2014.

King was also faculty senior scientist at the Lawrence Berkeley National Laboratory and was program leader for chemical processes in the Energy and Environment Division from 1978 to 1981. He was one of the founders of the Council for Chemical Research in 1981. In 1990, King co-founded the Separations Division of AIChE and served as its first chair.

== Research and work ==
=== Freeze drying ===
King's interest in hiking and camping reinforced his interests in freeze-dried foods to minimize the weight of his back-pack. He has done considerable research on dehydration of foods and beverages, and in particular those phenomena that influence the quality of the product. He started working with freeze drying, which removes water by direct vaporization from the frozen state. Although he started by measuring and explaining drying rates in terms of fundamental transport phenomena, he soon turned to learning how highly volatile substances such as taste and aroma components could best be retained despite their being much more volatile than the water which was itself being vaporized during evaporative drying. In 1971, King published a book, Freeze Drying of Foods.

King also gave a fundamental understanding of the phenomenon of product collapse during freeze drying and how to avoid it. That research was also valuable to the pharmaceutical industry which also often uses freeze drying. He also worked with freeze concentration for beverages, such as fruit juices, wherein water is frozen as suspended ice crystals which are then filtered out. These lines of research were financed by the U. S. Dept. of Agriculture. Subsequent research supported by the U. S. Army dealt with limited freeze drying that would leave enough water to provide sufficient pliability of the product for compression to smaller size for military uses.

=== Spray drying ===
King later turned to spray drying of beverages and other liquids, for which the loss of volatile flavor and aroma substances occurs largely in the spray-nozzle zone, where the droplets to be dried are formed. King and his colleagues examined factors influencing the loss of volatile flavors and aroma and also the factors affecting the development of particle morphology (size, shape, porosity, and thus the bulk density) of the dried product. They interpreted the factors that cause spray-dried particles to be sticky. In later research, King and his colleagues created a device to enable simultaneous measurement of particle morphology and loss of volatile components as the drying of single drops to particles took place. This research was supported by the National Science Foundation. He prepared review articles on retention of volatile flavor and aroma components during spray drying.

In later research, King and his colleagues created a device to enable simultaneous measurement of particle morphology and loss of volatile components as the drying of single drops to particles took place.

=== Removal and recovery of polar organics from aqueous streams ===
Some of King's research has dealt with the removal and recovery of polar organic substances from aqueous streams in two contexts. Research on removal of pollutants by solvent extraction was supported by the U. S. Environmental Protection Agency. He later turned to the use of solvent extraction and adsorption, with and without chemical complexation, for recovery of carboxylic acids, glycols and alcohols from aqueous process streams, such as occur in the manufacture of these chemicals from biomass by fermentation. Much of this work also dealt with novel methods of regeneration of the extractants or adsorbents. The research was sponsored by the U. S. Department of Energy through the Lawrence Berkeley National Laboratory.

=== Other work ===
In the initial years of his research, King focused on fundamental mechanisms of mass transfer between gases and liquids. This applied to separation processes such as absorption and distillation. Some of his other work dealt with systematic methods for synthesizing processes from component steps, such as sequencing multiple distillation columns and cascade refrigeration systems.

King stopped chemical engineering research in 1999, part-way through his service as Provost and Sr. Vice President for the University of California, university-wide. When he returned in 2004 to be director of Berkeley's Center for Studies in Higher Education, he wrote a number of papers relating to university structure, function, and governance and then the book on the University of California.

== Books ==
=== Separation Processes ===
King wrote the book Separation Processes in 1971. In the book, King presented that each of the separation processes (distillation, extraction, absorption, etc.) is a special case of a unified technology that can be described by a general set of quantitative principles. Before that, the standard separation operations were considered to be separate topics within the category of unit operations, with separate methodologies.

The book was revised for a second edition in 1980. After the book went out of print, King secured the copyright back from McGraw-Hill and put it on eScholarship, where it is available open-access.

=== The University of California ===
In 2018, King published the book, The University of California: Creating, Nurturing, and Maintaining Academic Quality in a Public University Setting. The book examines in depth the factors that have contributed to the academic success of University of California. He has made the book freely available through eScholarship.

== Personal life ==
King married Jeanne in 1957. They have three children: Mary Elizabeth, Cary and Catherine.

== Awards ==
- 1973 - 25th Annual Institute Lecturer, American Institute of Chemical Engineers
- 1975 - Food, Pharmaceutical and Bioengineering Division Award, American Institute of Chemical Engineers
- 1976 - William H. Walker Award, American Institute of Chemical Engineers
- 1978 - George Westinghouse Award, American Society for Engineering Education
- 1981 - Member, National Academy of Engineering
- 1983 - Fellow, American Institute of Chemical Engineers
- 1988 - Ninth Centennial Lecturer in Chemical Engineering, University of Bologna
- 1990 - Award for Excellence in Drying Research, International Drying Symposium
- 1990 - Mac Pruitt Award, Council for Chemical Research
- 1990 - Warren K. Lewis Award, American Institute of Chemical Engineers
- 1992 - Clarence G. Gerhold Award, Separations Division of AIChE
- 1993 - Fellow, American Association for the Advancement of Science
- 1993 - Centennial Medallion, American Society for Engineering Education
- 1997 - Award in Separations Science and Technology, American Chemical Society
- 1998 - Outstanding Alumnus, Yale Science and Engineering Association, Yale University
- 1998 - The Electrochemical Society Lecture, The Electrochemical Society
- 2009 - 100 Chemical Engineers of the Modern Era, Amer. Institute of Chemical Engineers
- 2018 - Clark Kerr Award, Academic Senate, University of California, Berkeley

== Publications ==
=== Books ===
- Separation Processes (1971); 2nd edition (1980)
- Freeze Drying of Foods (1971)
- The University of California: Creating, Nurturing, and Maintaining Academic Quality in a Public University Setting (2018)

=== Selected papers ===
- O. C. Sandall, C. J. King & C. R. Wilke, "The Relationship between Transport Properties and Rates of Freeze Drying of Poultry Meat", AIChE Jour., 13, 428-438 (1967).
- S. K. Chandrasekaran & C. J. King, "Multicomponent Diffusion and Vapor-Liquid Equilibria of Dilute Organic Components in Aqueous Sugar Solution", AIChE Jour., 18, 513-520 (1972).
- R. J. Bellows & C. J. King, "Freeze-drying of Aqueous Solutions: Maximum Allowable Operating Temperature", Cryobiology, 9, 559-561 (1972).
- T. G. Kieckbusch & C. J. King, "Volatiles Loss during Atomization in Spray Drying", AIChE Jour., 21, 718-725 (1980).
- G. E. Downton, J. L. Flores-Luna & C. J. King, "Mechanism of Stickiness in Hygroscopic, Amorphous Powders", Ind. Eng. Chem. Fundamentals, 21, 447-451 (1982).
- A. S. Kertes & C. J. King, "Extraction Chemistry of Fermentation Product Carboxylic Acids", Biotechnol. & Bioengg., 28, 269-282 (1986).
- C. J. King, "Separation Processes Based on Reversible Chemical Complexation", Ch. 15 in R. W. Rousseau, ed., Handbook of Separation Process Technology, pp. 760–774, Wiley, 1987.
- T. M. El-Sayed, D. A. Wallack & C. J. King, "Changes in Particle Morphology during Drying of Drops", Parts I & II, Ind. Engg. Chem. Research, 29, 2346-2354 (1990).
- C. J. King, "Amine-based System for Carboxylic Acid Recovery: Tertiary Amines and the proper choice of diluent allow extraction and recovery from water", CHEMTECH, 285-291 (May, 1992).
- L. A. Tung & C. J. King, "Sorption and Extraction of Lactic and Succinic Acids at pH>pKa1", Parts I & II, Ind. Engg. Chem. Res., 34, 3217-3229 (1994).
