= Andreas Seidel-Morgenstern =

German chemical engineer

Andreas Seidel-Morgenstern (born August 9, 1956 in Mittweida, East Germany) is a German Process Engineer. He is a Director of the Max Planck Institute for Dynamics of Complex Technical Systems in Magdeburg and Chair of Chemical Engineering at Otto-von-Guericke University Magdeburg.

== Education & professional career ==
Seidel-Morgenstern graduated from Technische Hochschule Leuna-Merseburg and received a Ph.D. from the Institute of Physical Chemistry of the Academy of Sciences in Berlin in 1987. After working as a postdoctoral fellow at the University of Tennessee in Knoxville he defended a Habilitation at Technische Universität Berlin in 1994. Subsequently he worked for Schering AG in Berlin, before becoming in 1995 Professor of Chemical Process Engineering at the Otto von Guericke University in Magdeburg. In 2002 he was appointed as a Director at the Max Planck Institute for Dynamics of Complex Technical Systems, where he is head of the “Physical and Chemical Foundations of Process Engineering” group.

== Major research interests ==
Seidel-Morgenstern's research interests include heterogeneous catalysis, adsorption and preparative chromatography, crystallization and the development of new reactor concepts. The results of his work are published in more than 400 research papers. Specifically, the following topics are being investigated in his department:

- New Reactor Concepts
- Chromatographic Reactors
- Membrane Reactors
- Heterogeneous catalysis
- Adsorption and Preparative chromatography
- Crystallization
- Separation of Enantiomers

== Awards & honors (selection) ==
Jahr	Position
since 2023	International Member of the National Academy of Engineering of the United States of America
2021	“Affordable Green Chemistry Award” of the American Chemical Society (ACS), together with Profs. K. Gilmore (University of Connecticut, USA) and P. Seeberger (Max-Planck-Institut für Kolloid- und Grenzflächenforschung, Potsdam-Golm)
2016	“Emil Kirschbaum-Medaille” (ProcessNet)
2019 - 2022	President of the International Adsorption Society (IAS)
2016 - 2019	Vice-President of the International Adsorption Society (IAS)
2015	Humanity in Science Award, granted by Phenomenex and The Analytical Scientist
2013	Member of Editorial Board of "Adsorption" (Springer US)
2012	Member of the German National Academy of Science and Engineering "Acatech"
2012	Honorary Doctorate „Doctor technices h.c.“ at the University of Southern Denmark (SDU, Odense, Denmark)
2010	Member of the Berlin-Brandenburg Academy of Sciences and Humanities
2008 - 2014	Member of "Commission for the Collaborative Research Centers" (German Science Foundation, DFG)
2008	Honorary Doctorate „Science in Technology” at the Lappeenranta University of Technology (LUT, Lappeenranta, Finland)
2007	Member of Editorial Board of the "Chemical Engineering Journal" (Elsevier, Amsterdam)
2006	Member of Working Party "Chemical Reaction Engineering" (European Federation of Chemical Engineering, EFCE)
2005	Member of Board of Trustees of the Journals "Chemical Engineering & Technology" and "Chemie Ingenieurtechnik" (Wiley-VCH, Weinheim)
2003 - 2008	Elected member of Board of Reviewers of the German Science Foundation for the fields of "Chemical and Thermal Process Engineering"
2002	Director at Max Planck Institute for Dynamics of Complex Technical Systems, Department of “Physical and Chemical Foundation of Process Engineering”, Magdeburg
2002	Otto von Guericke Research Award of Otto von Guericke University Magdeburg
2001 - 2021	Member of International Editorial Board of "Journal of Chromatography A" (Elsevier, Amsterdam)
2001 - 2015	Member of Board of Trustees of Ernest Solvay Foundation, Hanover
1999	Max Buchner Award of Dechema e.V.
1999	Member of Otto von Guericke Society, Magdeburg
1998	Member of Board of “Technical Reactions” (DECHEMA e.V., Frankfurt/M.)
1998 - 2001	External Scientific Member of the Max Planck Society at the Max Planck Institute for Dynamics of Complex Technical Systems, Magdeburg
1992 - 1994	Grant of German Science Foundation (DFG) to support Habilitation
1991 - 1992	Grant of the Scientific Council of NATO to support a Post-Doc stay in the USA

== Publications (selection) ==
Journal and Book Contributions, Patents
