= Clarence Hugo Linder =

American electrical engineer

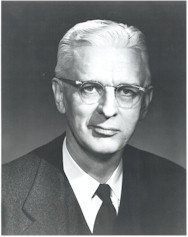
Clarence Hugo Linder

Clarence Hugo Linder (January 18, 1903 – May 3, 1994) was a noted American electrical engineer and a founding member of the National Academy of Engineering. He started at General Electric in 1924 and worked on a broad spectrum of its product line over his career, from turbines to consumer appliances, and eventually retired as its vice president in 1963.

== Biography ==
Linder was born in Ogema, Wisconsin, received his education through master's degree at the University of Texas, and in 1924 started his long career at General Electric. He held a number of positions in GE's Schenectady Works, including superintendent of the Searchlight Department at the start of World War II, and culminating as assistant manager in 1940s. In 1951 he was named manager of the Major Appliance Division, and in 1953 Vice President of Engineering. He became group executive for the Electric Utilities Group in 1960, and retired in 1963.

Linder was active in numerous professional groups. He was a fellow and president of the American Institute of Electrical Engineers and the Institute of Electrical and Electronics Engineers, fellow of the American Society of Mechanical Engineers, member of the American Society for Engineering Education and National Society of Professional Engineers, and active at the Massachusetts Institute of Technology, Harvard University, Vermont Academy, and Union College. He was awarded the IEEE Haraden Pratt Award in 1976.
