= Haldor Topsøe (1913–2013) =

Danish engineer

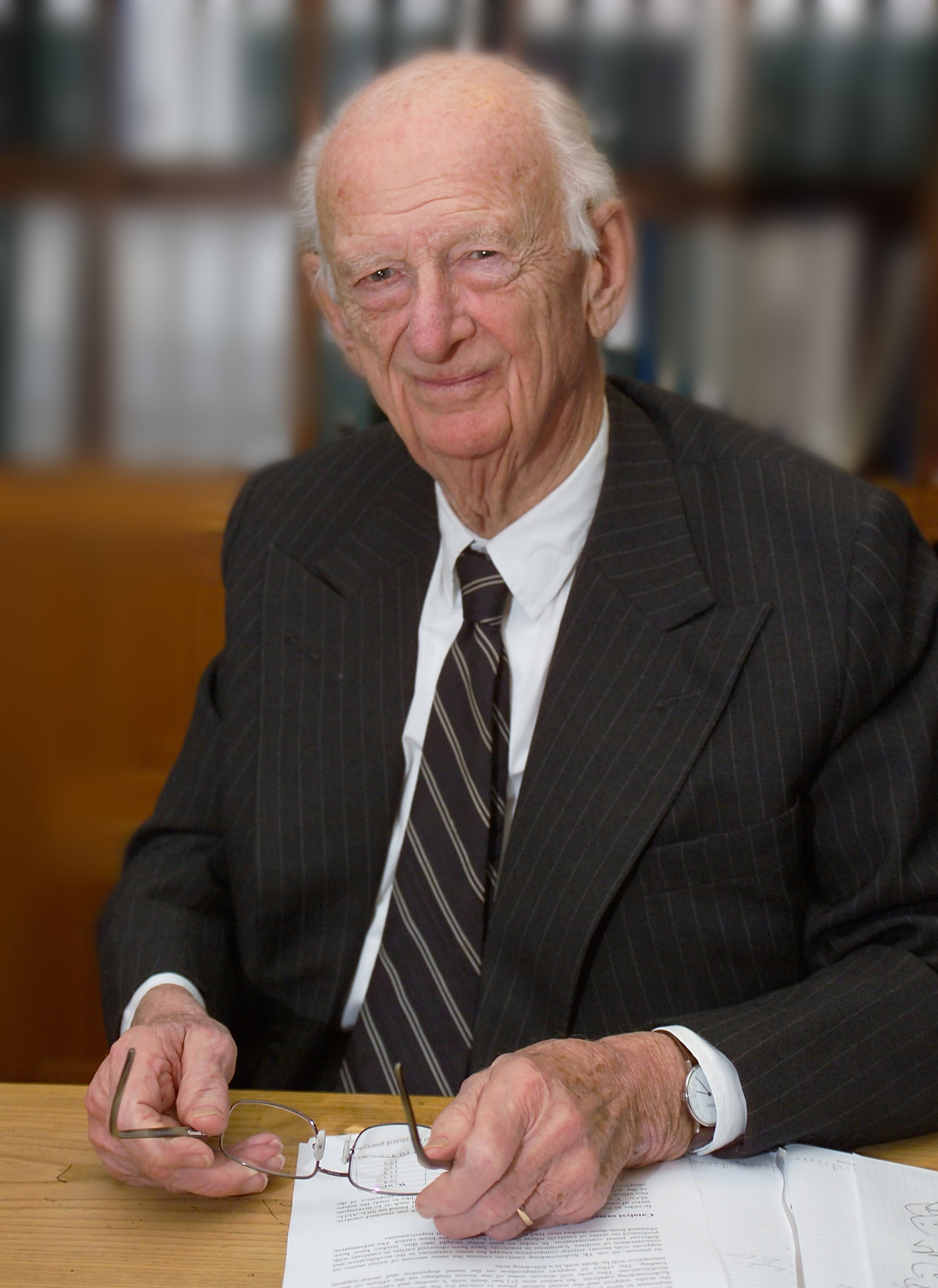
- Born: 24 May 1913; Copenhagen, Denmark
- Died: 20 May 2013 (aged 99); Denmark
- Occupation: Engineer
- Spouse: Inger Topsøe
- Children: 4

Haldor Frederik Axel Topsøe (24 May 1913 – 20 May 2013) was a Danish engineer and founder and chairman of the catalysis company Haldor Topsøe. He was grandson of the chemist and crystallographer Haldor Topsøe (1842–1935), after whom he is named.

== Biography ==
Topsøe was born on 24 May 1913 in Copenhagen, Denmark, as son of captain Flemming Topsøe (1885–1954) and Hedvig Sofie Topsøe (1888–1961). After graduating from Frederiksberg Gymnasium in 1931, he started studying physics under Niels Bohr and chemistry at the Technical University of Denmark. He became a master of Science in Engineering in chemistry in 1936. He started his career with working at AarhusKarlshamn 1936–1939 before founding his own catalysis company Haldor Topsøe in 1940 with which he established himself as engineer in Kongens Lyngby. The company got a production structure in Frederikssund in 1958 and later in Houston, United States.

During the 1950s, Topsøe experimented with petition of silicon to semiconductors in the cellar in his home and in 1959, he founded the process Topsil.

Topsøe owned the company Haldor Topsøe until 1972 when the Italian company Snamprogetti took over 50% of its shares. In 2007, he bought it back and it is since then owned to 100% by the Topsøe family. Besides his own process, Topsøe has also worked as among Chairman of the Scandinavian Airlines and Danish Air Lines and been member of the board of directors of among Kampsax, Incentive A/S, De forenede Bryggerier, Haand i Haand and Philips.

Topsøe became an honorary doctor in 1968 at Aarhus University, in 1969 at the Technical University of Denmark and in 1986 at Chalmers University of Technology in Gothenburg, Sweden. In 1985, he received the Royal Danish Academy of Sciences and Letters' gold medal and in 1991 a Hoover Medal. Topsøe was also member of several organizations, among them the Royal Swedish Academy of Engineering Sciences and since 1951 Akademiet for de Tekniske Videnskaber.

Topsøe owned the historic house Frydenlund from 1960.

== Death ==
In early May 2013, Topsøe broke his hip following a fall and had to cancel his planned centenarian celebration. He died on 20 May, just four days before his 100th birthday.

== Family ==
Topsøe was married to Inger Topsøe, born Veng Kunst 18 April 1913, from 1936 until her death on 20 August 2008 and they have four children, among them the mathematician Flemming Topsøe (born 25 August 1938) and the engineer Henrik Topsøe (born 1944) who became Chairman of Haldor Topsøe after his father's death in 2013; Henrik died of cancer on 9 August 2019, the day before his 75th birthday.
