= Topsoe =

Danish company

- Formerly: Haldor Topsoe A/S
- Type: A/S
- Industry: Electrolysis, Chemicals petrochemicals fuels and oils natural gas
- Founder: Haldor Topsøe, Founder
- Headquarters: Kgs. Lyngby, Denmark
- Key people: Haldor Topsøe, Founder; Jeppe Christiansen, Chairman of the Board; Roeland Baan, CEO
- Revenue: ▲DKK 6,225 million (2021)
- Number of employees: 2,300
- Website: www.topsoe.com

Topsoe (previously Haldor Topsøe) is a Danish company founded in 1940 by Haldor Topsøe. The company has approximately 2,300 employees, of which 1,700 work in Denmark.

The company specializes in technologies aimed at reducing carbon emissions, supplying technology, catalysts, and services for the global energy transition. That includes proprietary Solid oxide electrolyzer cell (SOEC) high-temperature electrolysis technology, the production of heterogeneous catalysts and the design of process plants based on catalytic processes. Focus areas include hard-to-abate sectors such as heavy industry (steel and iron, chemicals, cement), long-haul transportation (aviation, shipping, trucking) and clean fuels (bio-diesel and ultra-low-sulfur diesel (ULSD). Topsoe is actively involved in the field of heterogeneous catalysis, contributing significantly to the global production of ammonia for fertilizer

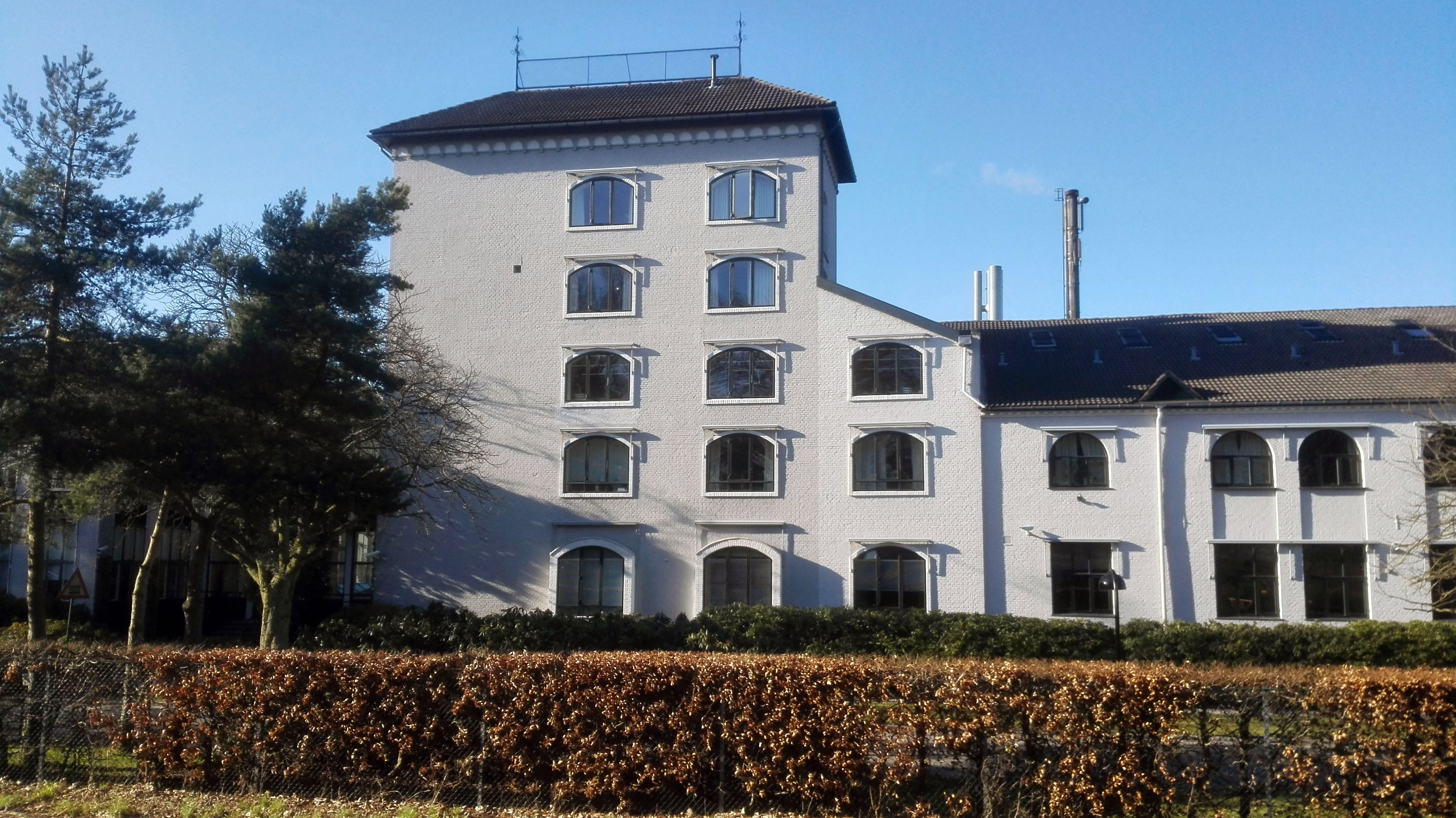
Haldor Topsoe headquarters in Lyngby, Denmark.

The headquarters and main research labs are located in Lyngby, a northern suburb of Copenhagen, Denmark, manufacturing of catalysts is carried out in Frederikssund, Denmark and Bayport Industrial District in the United States. The company has offices in Argentina, Australia, Bahrain, Brazil, Canada, China, India, Indonesia, Iran, Malaysia, Mexico, Saudi Arabia and the United States. Topsoe's catalysts and technologies are used for converting renewable feedstocks such as renewable electricity and waste or hydrocarbon feedstocks such as natural gas into ammonia, hydrogen, diesel and methanol.

The company collaborates with the Technical University of Denmark and with its research often appearing in scientific journals.

The founder, Dr. Haldor Topsøe, died on 20 May 2013 after a short illness, at age 99. He was the chairman of the company from its founding until his death. Jeppe Christiansen is now chairman of the board. Bjerne S. Clausen was president and CEO until June 2020. On June 2, 2020, Roeland Baan took over as president and CEO.

== History ==
Topsoe was founded in 1940 by Dr. Haldor Topsøe. During World War II, the company got permission to use the labs at the Polytechnic Educational Establishment, and in 1943 they moved to facilities in Hellerup, north of Copenhagen. The move meant that the company could expand its field of work because of the access to additional equipment.

During the war, Topsoe worked as a consultancy company for several Swedish companies. The contact to Sweden was primarily arranged by the so-called Wallenberg group.

In 1944 Topsoe produced the first small batch of sulfuric acid catalysts. Another company success came in 1948, when the development of the first nickel catalyst was finalized. That same year, Topsoe began cooperating with Vargöns AB in Vargön, Sweden with the aim of producing a catalyst for ammonia synthesis.

Shortly after the war had come to an end, Topsoe became engaged in various activities in Mexico that were connected to Topsoe's financial contacts in the US, including the World Bank. This led to the company's involvement in the planning of Mexico's technical development as well as in the American agronomist Norman Borlaug's experiment with wheat in the Sonora region of Northern Mexico.

In the years following 1950, Topsoe renewed its contacts with the research environment of the Soviet Union and maintained close contact for several years with both the scientific environment and organizations involved with engineering within the field of catalysis. In 1955, Topsoe established the French subsidiary Haldor Topsøe S.A. and opened an office in Paris. Throughout the years, Topsoe was involved in many industrial activities, some privately and some publicly governed, and built several industrial plants. One of the bigger projects in which Topsoe was involved, was the construction of a heavy water plant in Northern France.

In 1958, Topsoe bought the estate Linderupgaard, situated outside Frederikssund, and the estate has been used for production of catalysts ever since.

Topsoe opened a department in New York in 1961, called Haldor Topsoe Inc., and four years later the company bought a lot in Houston, Texas, that is now being used for one of Topsoe's production plants. In 1971, the office was moved from New York to Houston.

Topsoe has delivered process design and technologies for several big ammonia plants around the world. In 1972, the ownership of Topsoe changed from being a privately owned company to being a public limited company, owned 50/50 by Haldor Topsøe and the Italian company Snamproggeti.

In 1973, Topsoe headquarters moved to Søborg from Vedbæk, where it had been situated since 1964. Just a year later, in 1974, Topsoe moved the headquarters to its present location in Kongens Lyngby, just outside Copenhagen, Denmark.

In the beginning of the 1980s, Topsoe opened two offices in Asia: Delhi and Beijing. In the beginning of the 1990s to the mid-1990s, Topsøe opened offices in Moscow and Jaroslavl in Russia, as well as a department in Los Angeles in the US.

In 2007, Haldor Topsøe bought back all shares from the Italian contracting company Saipem (which had bought Snamprogetti) for DKK 2.6 billion. That same year, Haldor Topsoe's subsidiary, Topsoe Fuel Cell, initiated the construction of Denmark's first fuel cell production plant that produces high temperature solid oxide fuel cells (also known as SOFC) for environmentally friendly, green electricity and heat for trucks, houses, hospitals and supermarkets.

In June 2017, Umicore announced "that it has reached an agreement to acquire the heavy duty diesel and stationary catalyst businesses of Haldor Topsoe for an enterprise value of DKK 900 million (approx. EUR 120 million) plus an earn-out"; this acquisition should be earnings accretive from 2018.

In March 2019, Topsoe sold 30% of their stake to Singaporean investment firm Temasek for an undisclosed price.

In 2022, Haldor Topsoe underwent a rebranding to Topsoe. In September 2022, Topsoe won the world’s largest ever hydrogen electrolyses order to provide 5GW of its solid-oxide electrolyses.

== Criticism ==
In 2022, Topsoes investment in a factory producing Sustainable Aviation Fuel from palm oil in Manaus, Brazil, was criticized in Danish media. Experts argue that palm oil is one of the most environmentally damaging biofuels, contributing to deforestation and climate change. The planned facility, set to produce half a million tons of fuel annually by 2025, raises concerns about biodiversity loss and carbon emissions from deforestation. Despite Topsoe's claims that the project will adhere to sustainability certifications, critics say the reliance on palm oil undermines genuine climate action and risks worsening environmental degradation in the Amazon.

The NGO Corporate Observatory Europe notes Topsoe's involvement in lobby work at EU-level for inflated green hydrogen targets and expanded public funding into green hydrogen infrastructure, which risks diverting focus from more immediate and effective climate solutions.
