= Froment-Meurice =

Froment-Meurice is a surname. Notable people with the surname include:

- François-Désiré Froment-Meurice (1802–1855), French goldsmith
- Henri Froment-Meurice (1923–2018), French diplomat
- Marc Froment-Meurice (1953–2019), French philosopher

== See also ==
- Froment
- Meurice (disambiguation)
