= Tanmay Lele =

American chemical engineer

Academic background
- Education: B. Eng, chemical engineer, Institute of Chemical Technology; PhD, chemical engineer, 2002, Purdue University College of Engineering
- Thesis: An experimental and theoretical investigation into nonlinear phenomena during carbon monoxide oxidation on platinum(100) (2002)
- Doctoral advisor: Doraiswami Ramkrishna
- Website: lelelab.org

Tanmay Prakash Lele is an Indian-American chemical engineer. He is a Unocal Professor of Biomedical Engineering and Chemical Engineering at Texas A&M University. Lele’s areas of interest include cell mechanics, cell and tissue engineering, and quantitative cell biology.

== Early life and education ==
While growing up in Bombay, Lele learned to play the tabla. He earned his Bachelor of Engineering in chemical engineer at the Institute of Chemical Technology and his PhD in chemical engineer at Purdue University. Following his doctorate, Lele conducted postdoctoral research in vascular biology at Harvard Medical School and Boston Children's Hospital.

== Career ==
Lele became an assistant professor in the University of Florida's (UFL) Department of Chemical Engineering in 2006. In this role, he received a 2010 National Science Foundation CAREER Award. During his tenure at UFL, Lele focused on mechanobiology and cell nucleus. His research demonstrated that proteins of the linker of nucleoskeleton and cytoskeleton transmit mechanical stresses to the nucleus and are often disrupted in diseases such as cancer.

Lele was named a University of Florida Research Foundation Professor for a four year term from 2019 to 2022. However, he left UFL in 2020 for Texas A&M University and was named a Unocal Professor in the Department of Biomedical Engineering and Chemical Engineering. Lele was elected a Fellow of the Biomedical Engineering Society in 2022 and the American Institute for Medical and Biological Engineering in 2024.
