= Doraiswami Ramkrishna =

American chemical engineer

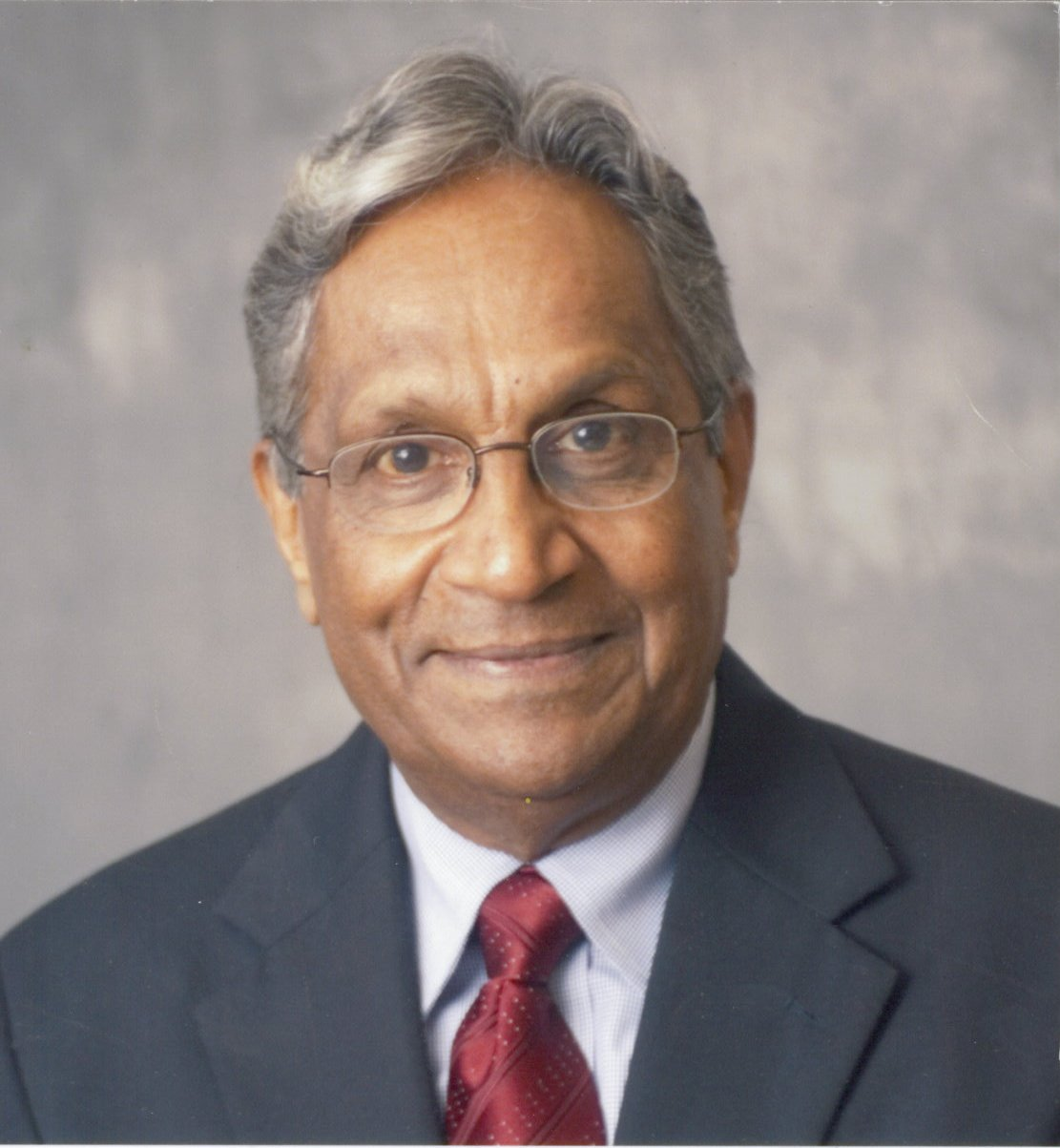
- Education: Institute of Chemical Technology; University of Mumbai; University of Minnesota
- Known for: Population Balance Modeling, Cybernetic Modeling and Linear Operators
- Awards: Member of National Academy of Engineering (2009)
- Scientific career
- Fields: Mathematical Modeling, Chemical reaction engineering, Transport phenomena
- Workplaces: Purdue University
- Doctoral advisor: Arnold Fredrickson and H. M. Tsuchiya
- Doctoral students: Over 35 students
- Website: Official Website

Doraiswami Ramkrishna is the Harry Creighton Peffer Distinguished Professor of Chemical Engineering at Purdue University since 1994.

== Education and early career ==
Ramkrishna earned his B. (Chem) Eng. degree from the University Department of Chemical Technology of University of Mumbai in 1960, and his PhD in chemical engineering from the University of Minnesota in 1965 with doctoral advisor Arnold Fredrickson. Following his PhD, he was an assistant professor for two years at Minnesota before returning to the Indian Institute of Technology Kanpur where he served on the faculty for nearly seven years. He returned to the United States in 1974 as a visiting associate professor in 1974, thereafter as a visiting professor at Minnesota in 1975 before joining Purdue University as a professor of chemical engineering in 1976.

== Research ==
Ramkrishna's research interests lie in the application of mathematics to chemical and biochemical reaction engineering. He has published nearly 280 papers and three books, one entitled Linear Operator Methods in Chemical Engineering (Prentice-Hall) coauthored with Neal Amundson, another on Population Balances. Theory and Applications to Particulate Systems in Engineering and Science (Academic Press), and the third, Cybernetic Modeling for Bioreaction Engineering, Cambridge University Press. He has directed approximately 45 doctoral students and numerous post-doctoral associates, and placed several students in academia.

== Awards and professorships ==
Ramkrishna has held a number of Distinguished Visiting Professorships in various universities such as Indian Institute of Science, Bangalore (1982: University Grants Commission Visiting professor), Bombay University (1983: G. P. Kane Visiting professor, 1994: Dow-Sharma Distinguished Fellow, 2010: M.M. Sharma Distinguished Professor), University of Minnesota (1988: George T. Piercy Distinguished Professor), University of Notre Dame (1994: Melchor Visiting professor).

In 2009, Ramkrishna was elected a member of the National Academy of Engineering. His election citation stated:

“For creation of new model concepts and solutions that improved the engineering of biological and particulate processes.,”

— U.S. National Academy of Engineering

Ramkrishna won the AIChE Alpha Chi Sigma Award in 1987, the Bombay University Distinguished Alumnus (UDCT Diamond) Award in 1994, was elected Fellow of the American Institute of Medical and Biological Engineering in 1996, the AIChE Wilhelm Award in 1998, the Senior Humboldt Prize in 2001, the AIChE Thomas Baron Award in 2004, and the AiChE William H. Walker Award in 2021, awarded Honorary Doctor of Science degree from the University of Minnesota in 2004, and the Purdue Research Excellence Award in 2005.
