= Arvind Varma =

American chemical engineer (1947–2019)

Distinguished Professor Arvind Varma
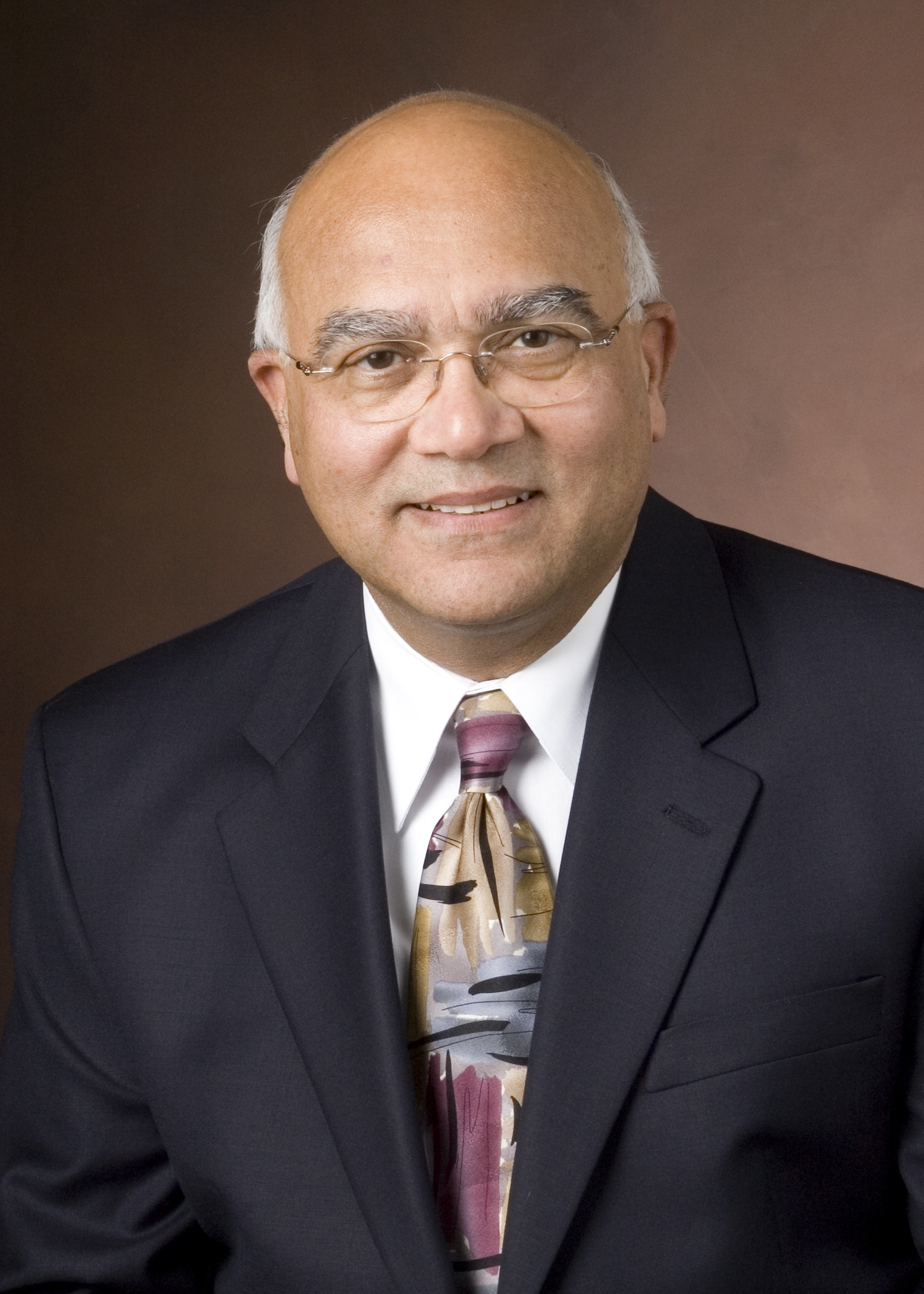
- Born: 13 October 1947; Firozabad, India
- Died: 14 July 2019 (aged 71)
- Education: University of Minnesota
- Known for: Reactor Theory, Combustion Synthesis, Novel Methods for Hydrogen Generation
- Scientific career
- Fields: Chemical Engineering, catalysis, chemical reaction engineering, combustion synthesis
- Workplaces: Purdue University
- Doctoral advisor: Neal Amundson

External videos
- https://www.youtube.com/watch?v=2rghTwRUg8o “2016 Bement Lecture - Dr. Arvind Varma”] “Remarks by Professor Arvind Varma”

Arvind Varma (13 October 1947 – 14 July 2019) was the R. Games Slayter Distinguished Professor, School of Chemical Engineering at Purdue University. His research interests are in chemical and catalytic reaction engineering, and new energy sources.

== Education and work ==
Varma served as the R. Games Slayter Distinguished Professor and Head, School of Chemical Engineering at Purdue University from January 2004 until June 2016 - he was named Jay and Cynthia Ihlenfeld Head in 2012. Prior to joining Purdue, he was the Arthur J. Schmitt Professor of Chemical Engineering and director of the Center for Molecularly Engineered Materials at the University of Notre Dame. A native of India, he received all his degrees in Chemical Engineering: B.S. from UICET, Panjab University (1966), M.S. from the University of New Brunswick (1968) and Ph.D. degree from the University of Minnesota (1972). He remained at Minnesota for one year as an assistant professor, and was a senior research engineer with Union Carbide Corporation for two years before joining the Notre Dame faculty in 1975. He achieved the rank of full professor in 1980, received the Schmitt Chair position in 1988, and was named founding director of the Center for Molecularly Engineered Materials in the year 2000.

Varma's research interests were in chemical and catalytic reaction engineering, and new energy sources. He published more than 275 archival journal research papers in these areas, and co-authored three books (Mathematical Methods in Chemical Engineering, Oxford University Press, 1997; Parametric Sensitivity in Chemical Systems, Cambridge University Press, 1999; Catalyst Design: Optimal Distribution of Catalyst in Pellets, Reactors and Membranes, Cambridge University Press, 2001) and co-edited two books. As a mentor, Varma has directed 41 completed Ph.D. dissertations, and the research of 26 post-doctoral research associates. He organized and chaired numerous technical sessions at professional society meetings, and served as Chair of ISCRE-18 held in June 2004. He also served on many national-level committees, including service as founding director of the AIChE Catalysis and Reaction Engineering Division (1996–98) and member of the AIChE Awards Committee (1994–99). He was a member of AIChE's international committee, chair of the awards committee, I&EC Division-ACS, and also chair of the Engineering Research Council Awards Committee, ASEE. He was the founding editor of the Cambridge Series in Chemical Engineering, a series of textbooks and monographs published by the Cambridge University Press.

Varma served as department chair at Notre Dame during 1982–1988. He held Visiting Professorships at a number of institutions, including Caltech (Chevron Visiting professor), Princeton, University of Wisconsin, University of Minnesota (Piercy Distinguished Visiting professor), Univ of Cagliari, Italy (Visiting Chair Professor), IIT-Kanpur and Institute of Chemical Technology-Mumbai (Kane Visiting professor; Golden Jubilee Fellow; Tilak Visiting Fellow).

== Fellowships, honors and recognitions ==
- Indo-American Fellowship, Fulbright Scholar Award, 1988–89
- College of Engineering Teacher of the Year Award, Univ. of Notre Dame, 1991
- Special Presidential Award, Univ. of Notre Dame, 1992
- R.H. Wilhelm Award, AIChE, 1993
- Series Editor, Cambridge Series in Chemical Engineering, 1996–present
- Burns Graduate School Award, Univ. of Notre Dame, 1997
- Ernest W. Thiele Award, AIChE (Chicago section), 1998
- Chemical Engineering Lectureship Award, ASEE, 2000
- Research Achievement Award (Inaugural), Univ. of Notre Dame, 2001
- Honorary Fellow (Inaugural batch), Indian Institute of Chem. Engineers, 2001
- Technologies of the Year (one of five), Industry Week, 2005
- Honoree, 60th Birthday sessions - I & II, AIChE Annual Meeting, 2007
- Distinguished ChE Alumnus (Inaugural batch of 3), Panjab University, 2008
- Distinguished University Alumnus, Panjab University, 2008
- Fellow, AIChE, 2008
- Honoree, Festschrift issue, [Industrial & Engineering Chemistry Research|I&EC Research] (Volume 47, No. 23), 2008
- Elected Foreign Member, Academy of Engineering, Mexico, 2010
- Fellow, American Association for the Advancement of Science, 2011
- Fellow, Industrial & Engineering Chemistry Division, American Chemical Society, 2011
- Leadership Award, college of engineering, Purdue University, 2011
- Warren K. Lewis Award, AIChE, 2013

== Illness and death ==
Varma was first diagnosed with pancreatic cancer in November 2015. He died on 14 July 2019. He was 71 years old.

== Books ==
- Mathematical Methods in Chemical Engineering, A. Varma and M. Morbidelli, 690 + xvi pages, Oxford University Press, New York, 1997.
- Parametric Sensitivity in Chemical Systems, A. Varma, M. Morbidelli and H. Wu, 342 + xvi pages, Cambridge University Press, Cambridge, U.K., 1999; paperback 2005.
- Catalyst Design: Optimal Distribution of Catalyst in Pellets, Reactors and Membranes, M. Morbidelli, A. Gavriilidis and A. Varma, Cambridge University Press, Cambridge, U.K., 2001; paperback 2005.
- The Mathematical Understanding of Chemical Engineering Systems: Selected Papers of N. R. Amundson, R. Aris and A. Varma (Editors), Pergamon Press, 829 pages, 1980.
- Chemical Reaction and Reactor Engineering, J. J. Carberry and A. Varma (Editors), Marcel Dekker, 1069 pages, 1987.
