= Gregory Stephanopoulos =

American chemical engineer

Willard Henry Dow Professor Gregory Stephanopoulos
- Born: 1950 (age 75–76)
- Education: University of Minnesota; University of Florida; National Technical University of Athens
- Known for: Biotechnology, Bioinformatics, Metabolic engineering
- Awards: National Academy of Engineering (2003); Fellow AAAS (2005); ENI Prize (2011)
- Scientific career
- Fields: Chemical Engineer
- Workplaces: MIT; Caltech
- Thesis: Mathematical Modelling of the Dynamics of Interacting Microbial Populations: Extinction Probabilities in a Stochastic Competition and Predation. (1978)
- Doctoral advisor: Arnold Fredrickson; Rutherford Aris

External videos
- “Making Greece a Technology Hub by 2021: Opening remarks by MIT professor Gregory Stephanopoulos”
- “Henry A. McGee Lecture 2016: Gregory Stephanopoulos, Ph.D.“

Greg N. Stephanopoulos (born c. 1950) is an American chemical engineer and the Willard Henry Dow Professor in the department of chemical engineering at the Massachusetts Institute of Technology. He has worked at MIT, Caltech, and the University of Minnesota in the areas of biotechnology, bioinformatics, and metabolic engineering especially in the areas of bioprocessing for biochemical and biofuel production. Stephanopoulos is the author of over 400 scientific publications with more than 35,000 citations (h index = 97) as of April 2018. In addition, Greg has supervised more than 70 graduate students and 50 post-docs whose research has led to more than 50 patents. He was elected a fellow of the American Association for the Advancement of Science (2005), a member of the National Academy of Engineering (2003), and received the ENI Prize on Renewable Energy 2011.

== Early life and education ==
He completed his Ph.D. in chemical engineering at the University of Minnesota in 1975, with advisors Arnold Fredrickson and Rutherford Aris on the topic of modeling of population dynamics. His thesis was published in 1978 with the title, "Mathematical Modelling of the Dynamics of Interacting Microbial Populations. Extinction Probabilities in a Stochastic Competition and Predation".

== Career ==
Stephanopoulos began his career as an assistant professor of chemical engineering at the California Institute of Technology in 1978. He was promoted to associate professor in 1978. In 1985, he was hired by the Massachusetts Institute of Technology as professor of chemical engineering. During his time at MIT, he has held the following positions: associate director, Biotechnology Center (1990-1997), professor of the MIT-Harvard Division of Health Science and Technology - HST (2000–Present), Bayer Professor of Chemical Engineering and Biotechnology (2000 - 2005), and the W. H. Dow Professor of Chemical Engineering and Biotechnology (2006–Present). From 2006 to 2007, he was a visiting professor at the Institute for Chemical and Bioengineering in Zürich, Switzerland.

As noted in the citation for his ENI Prize, Stephanopoulos's research has addressed the advancement of multiple aspects bioengineering:

He is mostly renowned for his studies on the global transcription machinery engineering technology, concerning the reprogramming of the gene transcription of particular bacteria, in order to modify their microbial cells, increasing their efficiency in transformation of raw material in hydrocarbons. Until now, the best result concerns the increase in tolerance of microbial cultivations to the toxicity of several products, and the consequent, relevant increase of productiveness in biofuels.

— ENI Award Citation, 2011

== Works ==
=== Books ===
- H. W. Blanch, E. T. Papoutsakis and Gregory Stephanopoulos, (eds.) Foundations of Biochemical Engineering, Kinetics and Thermodynamics of Biological System. ACS Symposium Series, 207 (1983).
- M. N. Karim and G. Stephanopoulos (eds.). Modelling and Control of Biotechnical Processes. IFAC Symposia Series No. 10, Proceedings of the 5th Int. Conf. of Computer App. in Ferm. Tech., Keystone, CO, 29 March - 2 April 1992, Pergamon Press (1992).
- G. Stephanopoulos (ed.), Bioprocessing, Vol. 3 of Biotechnology, H. J. Rehm, G. Reed, A. Puhler, P. Stadler (series eds.), VCH, Weinheim (1993).
- G. Stephanopoulos, Jens Nielsen, and A. Aristidou. Metabolic Engineering. Principles and Methodologies. Academic Press (1998).
- G. Stephanopoulos (ed.) Proceedings of the 1st Conference on Metabolic Engineering. Special Issue, Biotechnology & Bioengineering, Issues 2 & 3, (1998).
- Isidore Rigoutsos and G. Stephanopoulos (eds.), Systems Biology. Volume 1 and 2, Oxford University Press, (2006)

=== Journal articles ===
Stephanopoulos has authored more than 400 journal articles on the topics of biotechnology, bioinformatics, and metabolic engineering. These include:

- Gregory Stephanopoulos, R. Aris, A. G. Fredrickson. "A stochastic analysis of the growth of competing microbial populations in a continuous biochemical reactor", Mathematical Biosciences 45, 99-135, (1979).
- Gregory Stephanopoulos, R. Aris, A. G. Fredrickson. "The growth of competing microbial populations in a CSTR with periodically varying inputs", AIChE Journal 25, 863-872, (1979).
- G. Stephanopoulos, A. G. Fredrickson. ""Coexistence of Photosynthetic Microorganisms with Growth Rates Depending on the Spectral Quality of Light", Bulletin of Mathematical Biology 41, 525-542, (1979).
- G. Stephanopoulos, A. G. Fredrickson. "The Effect of Spatial Inhomogeneities on the Coexistence of Competing Microbial Populations", Biotechnology and Bioengineering 21, 1491-1498, (1979).
- Rahul Singhvi, Amit Kumar, Gabriel P. Lopez, Gregory N. Stephanopoulos, D. I. Wang, George M. Whitesides, Donald E. Ingber "Engineering cell shape and function", Science, 264(5159), 696-698, (1994).
- Hal Alper, Curt Fischer, Elke Nevoigt, Gregory Stephanopoulos. "Tuning genetic control through promoter engineering", Proceedings of the National Academy of Sciences, 102(36), 12678, (2005).
- Parayil Kumaran Ajikumar, Wen-Hai Xiao, Keith E. J. Tyo, Yong Wang, Fritz Simeon, Effendi Leonard, Oliver Mucha, Too Heng Phon, Blaine Pfeifer, Gregory Stephanopoulos. "Isoprenoid pathway optimization for Taxol precursor overproduction in Escherichia coli", Science, 330(6000), 70-74, (2010).
- Christian M Metallo, Paulo A. Gameiro, Eric L. Bell, Katherine R. Mattaini, Juanjuan Yang, Karsten Hiller, Christopher M Jewell, Zachary R Johnson, Darrell J. Irvine, Leonard Guarente, Joanne K. Kelleher, Matthew G. Vander Heiden, Othon Iliopoulos, Gregory Stephanopoulos. "Reductive glutamine metabolism by IDH1 mediates lipogenesis under hypoxia", Nature, 481(7381), 380, (2012).

== Honors ==
In 2003, Stephanopoulos was elected a member of the American National Academy of Engineering (NAE). His NAE election citation noted:

For pioneering contributions in defining and advancing metabolic engineering and for leadership in incorporating biology into chemical engineering research and education.

— Election Citation, National Academy of Engineering, 2003

Other awards and honors include:

- AIChE R.H. Wilhelm Award in Chemical Reaction Engineering (2001)
- Elected to the National Academy of Engineering (2002)
- Elected Fellow of AAAS (2005)
- AIChE Founders Award (2007)
- Amgen Biochemical Engineering Award (2009)
- ENI Prize in Renewable and Non-Conventional Energy (2011)
- Elected Fellow, American Academy of Microbiology (2013)
- Elected President of the American Institute of Chemical Engineers (2015)
