= Klavs F. Jensen =

Danish-American chemical engineer (born 1952)

Professor Klavs F. Jensen
- Born: 1952 (age 73–74); Denmark
- Education: University of Wisconsin; Technical University of Denmark
- Known for: Flow chemistry Microfluidics; Chemical Reaction Engineering
- Awards: National Academy of Engineering (2002); National Academy of Sciences (2017)
- Scientific career
- Fields: Chemical engineering
- Workplaces: University of Minnesota; Massachusetts Institute of Technology
- Doctoral advisors: W. Harmon Ray

External videos
- "Klavs Jensen on Accelerating Development and Intensification of Chemical Processes" "Klavs Jensen – 3eme Reunion Plenary Lecture"

Klavs Flemming Jensen (born August 5, 1952) is a chemical engineer who is currently the Warren K. Lewis Professor at the Massachusetts Institute of Technology (MIT).

Jensen was elected a member of the National Academy of Engineering in 2002 for fundamental contributions to multi-scale chemical reaction engineering with important applications in microelectronic materials processing and microreactor technology.

From 2007 to July 2015 he was the Head of the Department of Chemical Engineering at MIT.

== Education and career ==
Jensen received his chemical engineering education from the Technical University of Denmark (M.Sc., 1976) and University of Wisconsin–Madison (PhD, 1980). Jensen's PhD advisor was W. Harmon Ray. In 1980, Jensen became assistant professor of chemical engineering and materials science at the University of Minnesota, before being promoted to associate professor in 1984 and full professor in 1988. In 1989, he moved to the Massachusetts Institute of Technology.

At the Massachusetts Institute of Technology, Professor Jensen has been the Joeseph R. Mares Career Development Chair in Chemical Engineering (1989–1994), the Lammot du Pont Professor of Chemical Engineering (1996–2007), and the Warren K. Lewis Professor of Chemical Engineering (2007– present). Klavs served as Head of the MIT Department of Chemical Engineering from 2007 to 2015. In 2015, Professor Jensen became the founding Chair of the scientific journal Reaction Chemistry and Engineering by the Royal Society of Chemistry focused on bridging the gap between chemistry and chemical engineering.

== Research ==
Jensen's research revolves around reaction and separation techniques for on-demand multistep synthesis, methods for automated synthesis, and microsystems biological discovery and manipulation. He is considered one of the pioneers of flow chemistry.

Jensen, Armon Sharei and Robert S. Langer were the founders of SQZ Biotech. The trio, together with Andrea Adamo, developed the cell squeezing method in 2012. It enables delivery of molecules into cells by a gentle squeezing of the cell membrane. It is a high throughput vector-free microfluidic platform for intracellular delivery. It eliminates the possibility of toxicity or off-target effects as it does not rely on exogenous materials or electrical fields.

Jensen, along with Timothy F. Jamison, Allan Myerson and coworkers, designed a refrigerator-sized mini factory to make clinic-ready drug formulations. The mini factory can make thousands of doses of a drug in about two hours. The factory can allow sudden public health needs to be more easily addressed. It can also be useful in developing countries and for making medicines with a short shelf life. Chemical & Engineering News named the mini factory in their list of notable chemistry research advances from 2016.

=== Cell Squeeze ===
Cell Squeeze is the commercial name for a method for deforming a cell as it passes through a small opening, disrupting the cell membrane and allowing material to be inserted into the cell. It is an alternative method to electroporation or cell-penetrating peptides and operates similarly to a french cell press that temporarily disrupts cells, rather than completely bursting them.

==== Method ====
The cell-disrupting change in pressure is achieved by passing cells through a narrow opening in a microfluidic device. The device is made up of channels etched into a wafer through which cells initially flow freely. As they move through the device, the channel width gradually narrows. The cell's flexible membrane allows it to change shape and become thinner and longer, allowing it to squeeze through. As the cell becomes more and more narrow, it shrinks in width by about 30 to 80 percent its original size and the forced rapid change in cell shape temporarily creates holes in the membrane, without damaging or killing the cell.

While the cell membrane is disrupted, target molecules that pass by can enter the cell through the holes in the membrane. As the cell returns to its normal shape, the holes in the membrane close. Virtually any type of molecule can be delivered into any type of cell. The throughput is approximately one million per second. Mechanical disruption methods can cause fewer gene expression changes than electrical or chemical methods. This can be preferable in studies that require the gene expression to be controlled at all times.

==== Applications ====
Like other cell permeablisation techniques, it enables intracellular delivery materials, such as proteins, siRNA, or carbon nanotubes. The technique has been used for over 20 cell types, including embryonic stem cells and naïve immune cells. Initial applications focused on immune cells, for example delivering:

- Anti-HIV siRNAs for blocking HIV infection in CD4+ T cells.
- Whole protein antigen and enabling MHC class I processing/presentation in polyclonal B cells, facilitating B cell-based vaccine approaches.

==== Commercialization ====
The process was originally developed in 2013 by Armon Sharei and Andrea Adamo, in the lab of Langer and Jensen at Massachusetts Institute of Technology. In 2014 Sharei founded SQZBiotech to demonstrate the technology. That year, SQZBiotech won the $100,000 grand prize in the annual startup competition sponsored by Boston-based accelerator MassChallenge.

Boeing and the Center for the Advancement of Science in Space (CASIS) awarded the company the CASIS-Boeing Prize for Technology in Space to support the use of Cell Squeeze on the International Space Station (ISS).

== Honours ==
=== Memberships and fellowships ===
Jensen was the recipient of a Guggenheim Fellowship in 1987. Jensen became an Elected Fellow of the Royal Society of Chemistry in 2004 and American Association for the Advancement of Science in 2007. He also became a member of the National Academy of Engineering in 2002 and the American Academy of Arts and Sciences in 2008. In May 2017, he was elected to the National Academy of Sciences in recognition of his "distinguished and continuing achievements in original research."

=== Awards ===
In 2008, Jensen was included as one of the "100 Chemical Engineers of the Modern Era" by the American Institute of Chemical Engineers' (AIChE) Centennial Celebration Committee. In March 2012, he was the first recipient of the IUPAC-ThalesNano Prize in Flow Chemistry. Jensen was named in Foreign Policy magazine's 2016 list of the leading global thinkers along with Timothy F. Jamison and Allan Myerson. In 2016, he received the AIChE Founders Award for Outstanding Contributions to the Field of Chemical Engineering. Jensen has also received the National Science Foundation Presidential Young Investigator Award.

== Selected works ==
Klavs Jensen has authored numerous journal articles describing significant advances in flow chemistry, microfluidics, chemical vapor deposition, and chemical engineering which includes but is not limited to:

- Bashir O Dabbousi, Javier Rodriguez-Viejo, Frederic V Mikulec, Jason R Heine, Hedi Mattoussi, Raymond Ober, Klavs F Jensen, Moungi G Bawendi "(CdSe) ZnS core− shell quantum dots: synthesis and characterization of a size series of highly luminescent nanocrystallites", Journal of Physical Chemistry B 46(101), 9463–9475 (1997).
- Jamil El-Ali, Peter K Sorger, Klavs F Jensen "Cells on Chips", Nature 442(7101), 403 (2006).
- Klavs F Jensen "Microreaction engineering - is small better?", Chemical Engineering Science 56(2), 293–303 (2001).
- Jinwook Lee, Vikram C Sundar, Jason R Heine, Moungi G Bawendi, Klavs F Jensen "Full color emission from II–VI semiconductor quantum dot–polymer composites", Advanced Materials 12(15), 1102–1105 (2000).
- Axel Gunther, Klavs F Jensen "Multiphase microfluidics: from flow characteristics to chemical and materials synthesis", Lab on a Chip 6(12), 1487–1503 (2006).
- Harry Moffat, Klavs F Jensen "Complex flow phenomena in MOCVD reactors: I. Horizontal reactors", Journal of Crystal Growth 77(1–3), 108–119 (1986).
- Lisi Xie, Qing Zhao, Klavs F. Jensen, Heather J. Kulik "Direct Observation of Early-Stage Quantum Dot Growth Mechanisms with High-Temperature Ab Initio Molecular Dynamics", The Journal of Physical Chemistry C 120(4), 2472–2483 (2016).

== See also ==
- Transfection
