= Arnold Fredrickson =

American chemical engineer (1932–2017)

A.G. Fredrickson
- Born: April 11, 1932; Faribault, Minnesota U.S.
- Died: November 27, 2017 (aged 85); Minneapolis, Minnesota, U.S.
- Education: University of Minnesota; University of Wisconsin
- Known for: Transport phenomena; Population dynamics; Bioprocessing
- Awards: Fellow, AIMBE (1993); Fellow AAAS (1997)
- Scientific career
- Fields: Chemical engineer, materials science
- Workplaces: University of Minnesota
- Thesis: Flow of non-Newtonian fluids in annuli (1959)
- Doctoral advisor: Robert Byron Bird
- Doctoral students: Doraiswami Ramkrishna; Gregory Stephanopoulos

Arnold Gerhard Fredrickson (April 11, 1932 – November 27, 2017) was an American chemical engineer and professor in the department of chemical engineering and materials science (CEMS) at the University of Minnesota. He was known for his work in transport phenomena, bioengineering and population dynamics. Fredrickson was the author of over 100 scientific publications and advisor to over 50 graduate students. He was recognized for his contributions to chemical engineering with election as fellow to the American Association for the Advancement of Science (1997) and fellow and founding member of the American Institute of Medical and Biological Engineers (1993).

== Early life and education ==
Arnold was born and grew up in Faribault, Minnesota, located about 50 miles south of Minneapolis. In 1954, he completed his B.S with distinction in chemical engineering from the University of Minnesota, followed by a master's degree in chemical engineering from Minnesota in 1956. He then completed in 1959 a Ph.D. in chemical engineering at the University of Wisconsin, Madison, with Professor Robert Byron Bird in the field of fluid mechanics. His thesis was published in 1959 with the title, "Flow of Non-Newtonian Fluids in Annuli". During his time in graduate school, Arnold published two papers and a book chapter.

- A.G. Fredrickson, R.B. Bird "Non-Newtonian Flow in Annuli", Industrial and Engineering Chemistry, 50, 347–352, (1958).
- A.G. Fredrickson, R.B. Bird, William Wilcox "Correspondence: Friction Factors for Axial Non-Newtonian Annular Flow", Industrial and Engineering Chemistry, 50, 1599–1600, (1958).
- A.G. Fredrickson, R.B. Bird "Transport Phenomena in Multicomponent Systems", Sec. 6, 56 pp. in "Handbook of Fluid Dynamics," ed. by V.L. Streeter (New York: McGraw-Hill, 1961).

== Research and education at Minnesota ==
Following a year as a process engineer at ADM in Minneapolis, MN, in 1957, Arnold became an assistant professor of Chemical Engineering and Materials Science (1958-1963) at the University of Minnesota. He was promoted to associate professor in 1963 and full professor in 1966). At Minnesota he focused his research on the modeling of the dynamics and kinetics of the growth processes of microbes and cells. These models find applications in the impact of environmental pollution, particularly with regard to the bioprocesses occurring in the soil, lakes, and rivers. His research in particular addressed the modeling of the complexity of populations of organisms which could account for characteristics including cell size and protein content. He further expanded on modeling and numerical methods of population dynamics by connecting advanced numerical models with experimental population dynamics made available with advances in experimental flow cytometry. During his tenure as professor at the University of Minnesota, Professor Fredrickson advised over 50 graduate students including Professor Gregory Stephanopoulos at MIT.

== Awards, honors, and legacy ==
Arnold's research and contributions to education and service have been highlighted with awards, many of which identify his focus for scholarship in directions that merged biology and chemical engineering with mathematics and modeling. In 1993, Arnold was elected a fellow of the American Institute for Medical and Biological Engineering. His AIMBE Fellows election citation noted:

For development of the conceptual framework necessary for the quantitative description of the growth of cells and populations in bioprocesses.

— Election Citation, AIMBE College of Fellows Class, 1933

Other awards and honors include:

- American Chemical Society, Division of Industrial and EngineeringChemistry, Best Paper Award, 1967.
- University of Minnesota Institute of Technology Distinguished Teacher Award, 1971.
- O. A. Hougen visiting professor of chemical engineering, University of Wisconsin, 1986.
- Food, Pharmaceutical and Bioengineering Division of the AIChE, Annual Award, 1988.
- Elected Fellow of the American Association for the Advancement of Science, 1997.
- Visiting professor, International Center for Cooperative Research in Biotechnology, Osaka University, Osaka, Japan, 1998.

== Publications ==
Fredrickson has authored numerous journal articles describing aspects of transport phenomena, biotechnology, and population dynamics. They include:

- H. Ted Davis, Stuart A. Rice, Lothar Meyer "Growth Processes in a Cascade of Bioreactors: Mathematical Models", Bioengineering, Food and Natural Products, 45(1), 164, (2004).
- N.V. Mantzaris, P. Daoutidis, F. Srienc, A.G. Fredrickson "Growth Processes in a Cascade of Bioreactors: Comparison of Modeling Approaches", Bioengineering, Food and Natural Products, 45, 177, (1999).
- J. Liou F. Srienc, A.G. Fredrickson "Solutions of population balance models based on a successive generations approach", Chemical Engineering Science, 52(9), 1529–1540, (1997).
- P.J. Sweeney, F. Srienc, A.G. Fredrickson "Measurement of Unequal DNA Partitioning in Tetrahymena Pyriformis using Slit-Scanning Flow Cytometry", Biotechnology Progress, 10(1), 19–25, (1994).
- C. Hatzis, P.J. Sweeney, F. Srienc, A.G. Fredrickson "Determination of Cellular Rate Distributions in Microbial Cell Populations: Feeding Rates in Ciliated Protozoa ", Biotechnology & Bioengineering, 42(3), 284–294, (1993).
- A.G. Fredrickson "Growth processes in bioreactors with external sources of biomass: Application of structured, continuum models", AIChE Journal, 38(6), 835–846, (1992).
- D.P. Lavin, A.G. Fredrickson, F. Srienc "Flow Cytometric Measurement of Rates of Particle Uptake from Dilute Suspensions by a Ciliated Protozoan", Cytometry, 11, 875–882, (1990).
- D.P. Lavin, A.G. Fredrickson, F. Srienc "Segregated, structured, distributed models and their role in microbial ecology: A case study based on work done on the filter-feeding ciliateTetrahymena pyriformis.", Microb. Ecol., 1, 139–159, (1991).
- C. Hatzis, P.J. Sweeney, F. Srienc, A.G. Fredrickson "A discrete, stochastic model for microbial filter feeding: a model for feeding of ciliated protists on spatially uniform, nondepletable suspensions.", Math. Biosci., 102(2), 127–181, (1990).
- S. Pavlou, A.G. Fredrickson "Growth of microbial populations in nonminimal media: some considerations for modeling..", Biotechnology & bioengineering., 34(7), 971–989, (1989).
