= Cell-penetrating peptide =

Peptides that facilitate cellular intake

Cell-penetrating peptides (CPPs) are short peptides that facilitate cellular intake and uptake of molecules ranging from nanosize particles to small chemical compounds to large fragments of DNA. The "cargo" is associated with the peptides either through chemical linkage via covalent bonds or through non-covalent interactions.

CPPs deliver the cargo into cells, commonly through endocytosis, for use in research and medicine. Current use is limited by a lack of cell specificity in CPP-mediated cargo delivery and insufficient understanding of the modes of their uptake. Other delivery mechanisms that have been developed include CellSqueeze and electroporation.

CPPs typically have an amino acid composition that either contains a high relative abundance of positively charged amino acids such as lysine or arginine or has sequences that contain an alternating pattern of polar, charged amino acids and non-polar, hydrophobic amino acids. These two types of structures are referred to as polycationic or amphipathic, respectively. A third class of CPPs are the hydrophobic peptides, containing only apolar residues with low net charge or hydrophobic amino acid groups that are crucial for cellular uptake.

Transactivating transcriptional activator (TAT), from human immunodeficiency virus 1 (HIV-1), was the first CPP discovered. In 1988, two laboratories independently found that TAT could be efficiently taken up from the surrounding media by numerous cell types in culture. Since then, the number of known CPPs has expanded considerably, and small molecule synthetic analogues with more effective protein transduction properties have been generated.

A recent discovery found that Papillomaviridae, such as the human papillomavirus, use CPPs to penetrate the intracellular membrane to trigger retrograde trafficking of the viral unit to the nucleus.

== Mechanisms of membrane translocation ==
Cell-penetrating peptides are of different sizes, amino acid sequences, and charges, but all CPPs have the ability to translocate the plasma membrane and facilitate the delivery of various molecular cargoes to the cytoplasm or an organelle. No real consensus explains the translocation mechanism, but candidates can be classified into three mechanisms: direct penetration in the membrane, endocytosis-mediated entry, and translocation through a transitory structure. CPP transduction is an area of ongoing research.

Cell-penetrating peptides (CPP) are able to transport different types of cargo molecules across plasma membrane; thus, they act as molecular delivery vehicles. They have numerous applications in medicine as drug delivery agents in the treatment of different diseases including cancer and virus inhibitors, as well as contrast agents for cell labeling. Examples of the latter include acting as a carrier for GFP, MRI contrast agents, or quantum dots.

=== Direct penetration ===
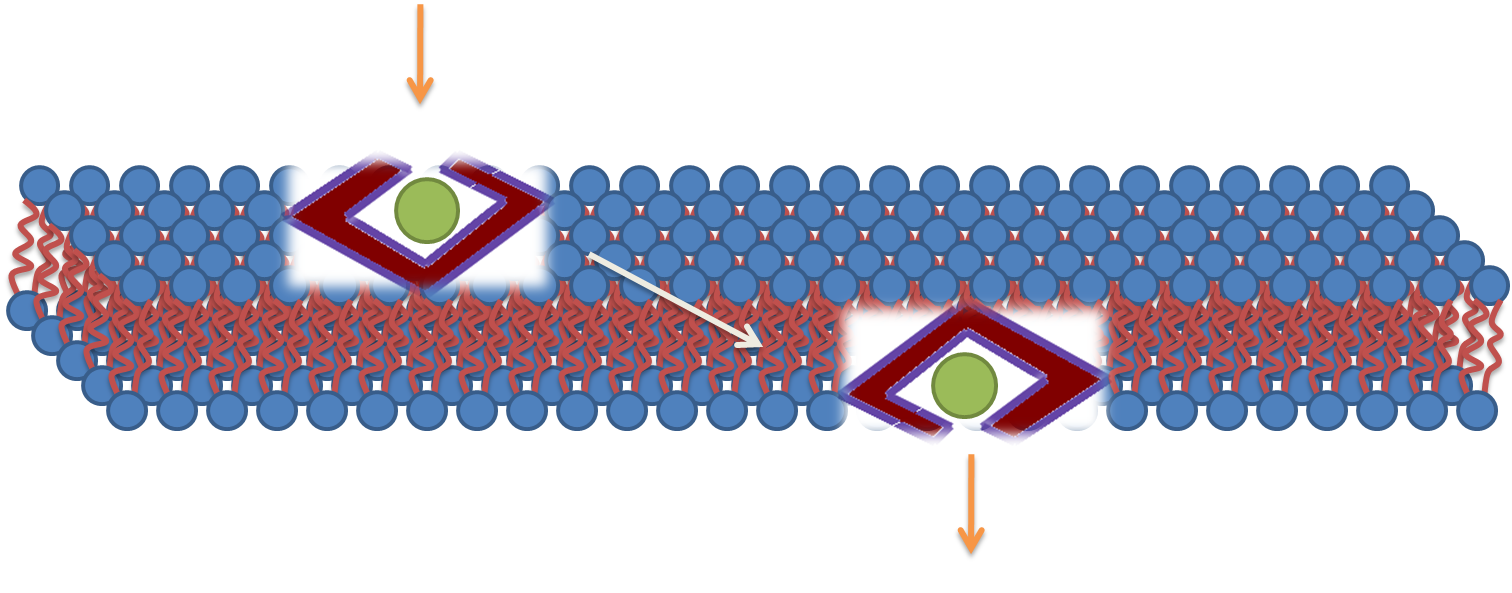
Example of translocation of cargo through direct penetration

The majority of early research suggested that the translocation of polycationic CPPs across biological membranes occurred via an energy-independent cellular process. It was believed that translocation could progress at 4 °C and most likely involved a direct electrostatic interaction with negatively charged phospholipids. Researchers proposed several models in attempts to elucidate the biophysical mechanism of this energy-independent process. Although CPPs promote direct effects on the biophysical properties of pure membrane systems, the identification of fixation artifacts when using fluorescent labeled probe CPPs caused a reevaluation of CPP-import mechanisms. These studies promoted endocytosis as the translocation pathway. An example of direct penetration has been proposed for TAT. The first step in this proposed model is an interaction with the unfolded fusion protein (TAT) and the membrane through electrostatic interactions, which disrupt the membrane enough to allow the fusion protein to cross the membrane. After internalization, the fusion protein refolds due to the chaperone system. This mechanism was not agreed upon, and other mechanisms involving clathrin-dependent endocytosis have been suggested.

Many more detailed methods of CPP uptake have been proposed including transient pore formation. This mechanism involves strong interactions between cell-penetrating peptides and the phosphate groups on both sides of the lipid bilayer, the insertion of positively charged arginine side-chains that nucleate the formation of a transient pore, followed by the translocation of cell-penetrating peptides by diffusing on the pore surface. This mechanism explains how key ingredients, such as the cooperation among the peptides, the large positive charge, and specifically the guanidinium groups, contribute to the uptake. The proposed mechanism also illustrates the importance of membrane fluctuations. Indeed, mechanisms that involve large fluctuations of the membrane structure, such as transient pores and the insertion of charged amino acid side-chains, may be common and perhaps central to the functions of many membrane protein functions.

=== Endocytosis-mediated translocation ===
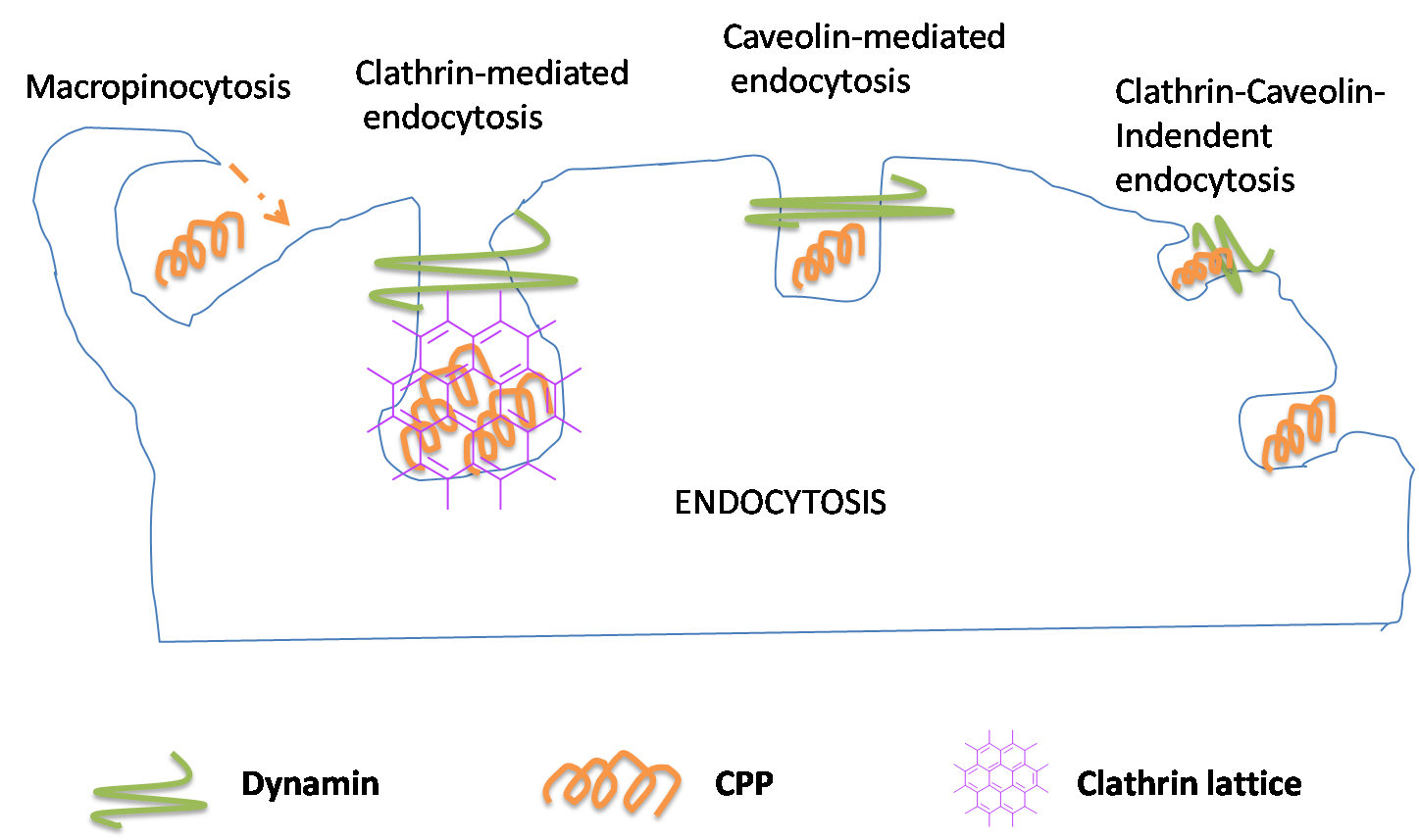
Types Endocytosis Mediated by Cell-Penetrating Peptides

Endocytosis is another mechanism for cellular internalization. Endocytosis is the process of cellular ingestion by which the plasma membrane folds inward to bring substances into the cell. During this process cells absorb material from the outside of the cell by imbibing it with their cell membrane. The classification of cellular localization using fluorescence or by endocytosis inhibitors is the basis of most examination. However, the procedure used during preparation of these samples creates questionable information regarding endocytosis. Moreover, studies show that cellular entry of penetratin by endocytosis is an energy-dependent process. This process is initiated by polyarginines interacting with heparan sulphates that promote endocytosis. Research has shown that TAT is internalized through a form of endocytosis called macropinocytosis.

Studies have illustrated that endocytosis is involved in the internalization of CPPs, but it has been suggested that different mechanisms could transpire at the same time. This is established by the behavior reported for penetratin and transportan wherein both membrane translocation and endocytosis occur concurrently.

=== Translocation through the formation of a transitory structure ===
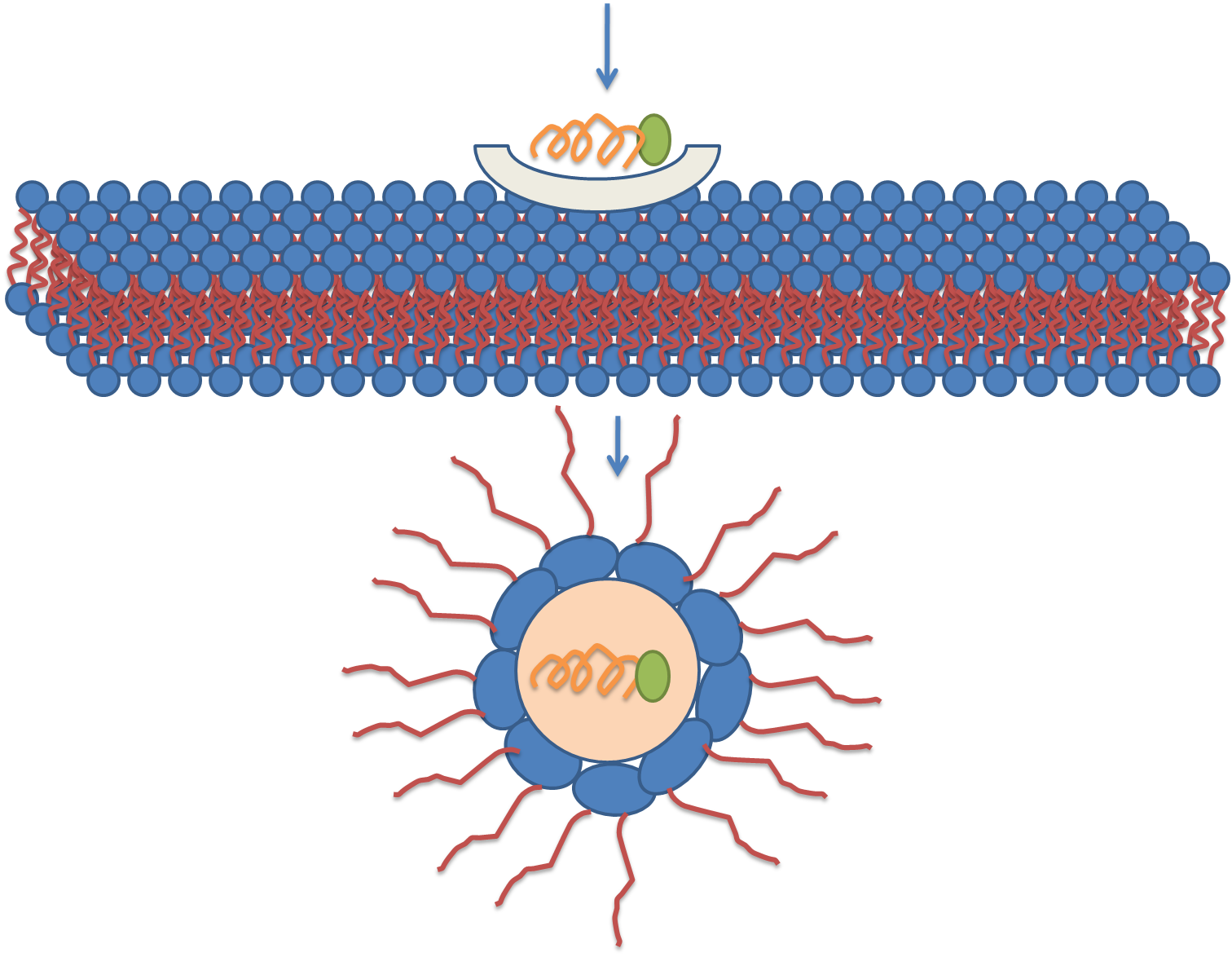
Translocation Mediated by the Formation of Inverted Micelles

The third mechanism responsible for the translocation is based on the formation of the inverted micelles. Inverted micelles are aggregates of colloidal surfactants in which the polar groups are concentrated in the interior and the lipophilic groups extend outward into the solvent. According to this model, a penetratin dimer combines with the negatively charged phospholipids, thus generating the formation of an inverted micelle inside of the lipid bilayer. The structure of the inverted micelles permits the peptide to remain in a hydrophilic environment. Nonetheless, this mechanism is still a matter of discussion, because the distribution of the penetratin between the inner and outer membrane is non-symmetric. This non-symmetric distribution produces an electrical field that has been well established. Increasing the amount of peptide on the outer leaflets causes the electric field to reach a critical value that can generate an electroporation-like event.

The last mechanism implied that internalization occurs by peptides that belong to the family of primary amphipathic peptides, MPG and Pep-1. Two similar models have been proposed based on physicochemical studies, consisting of circular dichroism, Fourier transform infrared, and nuclear magnetic resonance spectroscopy. These models are associated with electrophysiological measurements and investigations that have the ability to mimic model membranes such as monolayer at the air-water interface. The structure giving rise to the pores is the major difference between the proposed MPG and Pep-1 model. In the MPG model, the pore is formed by a b-barrel structure, whereas the Pep-1 is associated with helices. In addition, strong hydrophobic phospholipid-peptide interactions have been discovered in both models. In the two peptide models, the folded parts of the carrier molecule correlate to the hydrophobic domain, although the rest of the molecule remains unstructured.

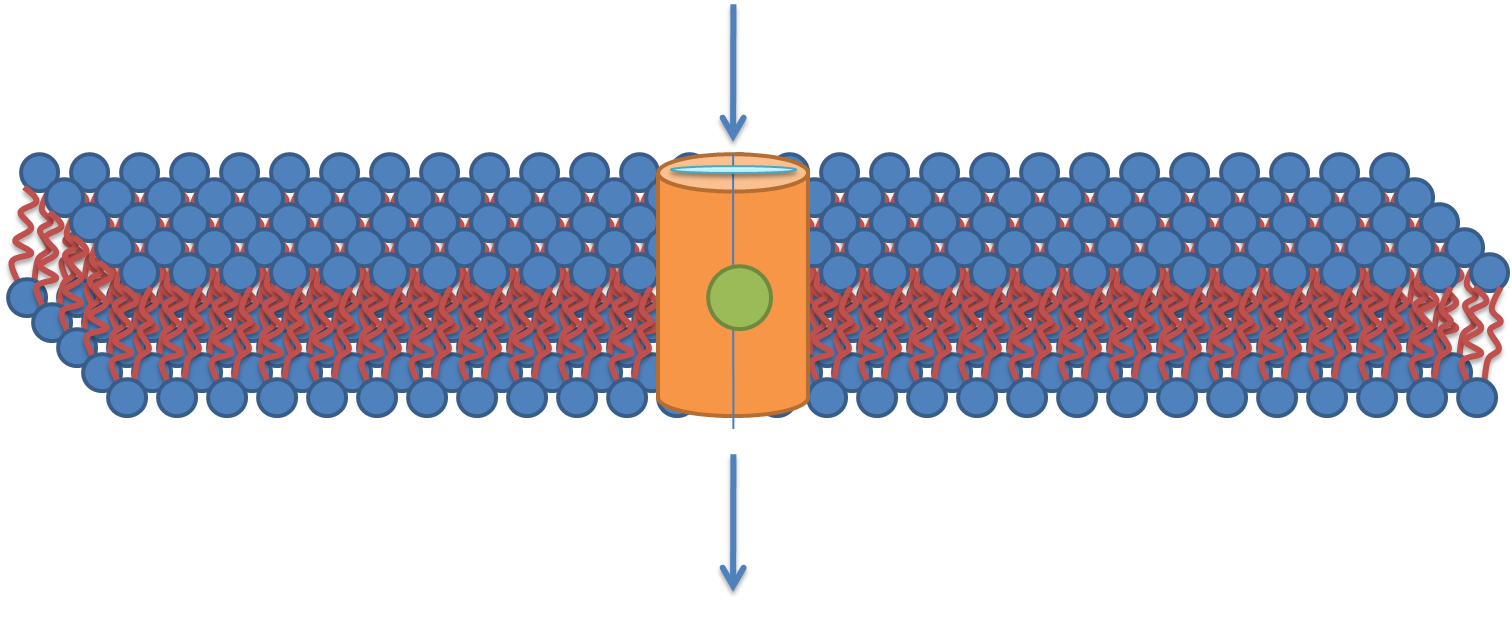
Translocation Mediated by a Transitory Structure

Cell-penetrating peptide facilitated translocation is a topic of great debate. Evidence has been presented that translocation could use several different pathways for uptake. In addition, the mechanism of translocation can be dependent on whether the peptide is free or attached to cargo. The quantitative uptake of free or CPP connected to cargo can differ greatly but studies have not proven whether this change is a result of translocation efficiency or the difference in translocation pathway. It is probable that the results indicate that several CPP mechanisms are in competition and that several pathways contribute to CPP internalization.

== Applications ==
=== Nucleic acid delivery ===
Nucleic acid-based macromolecules such as siRNA, antisense oligonucleotide, decoy DNA, and plasmid are promising biological and pharmacological therapeutics in regulation of gene expression. However, unlike other small-molecular drugs, their development and applications are limited by high molecular weight and negative charges, which results in poor uptake efficiency and low cellular traffic. To overcome these problems, several different delivery systems have been developed, including CPP-nucleic acid conjugate, which is a powerful tool.

==== Formation of CPP-nucleic acid complexes ====
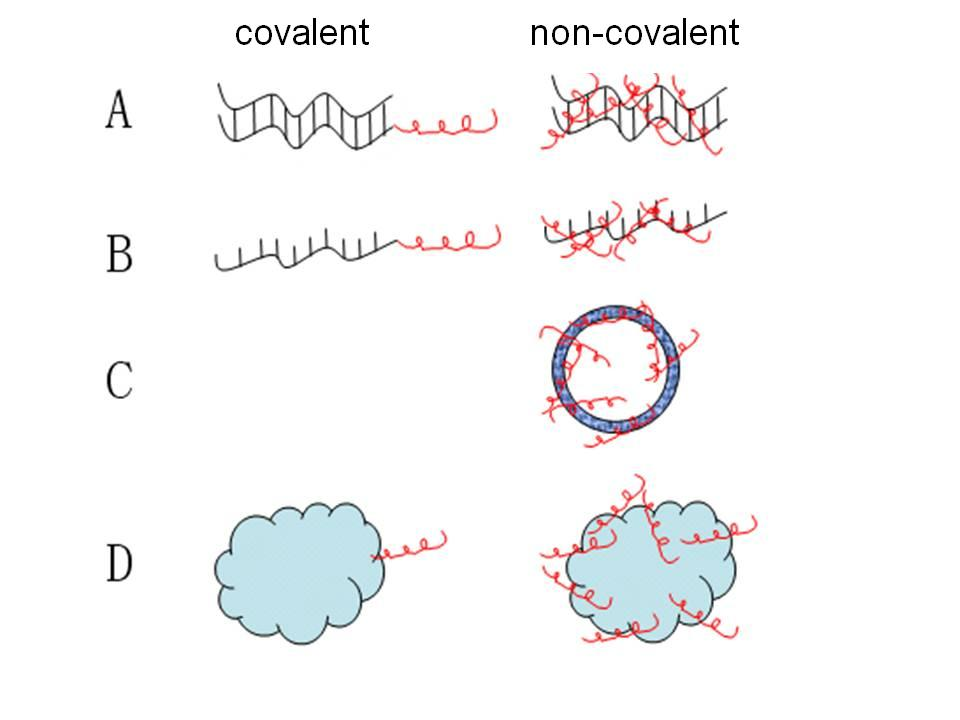
Covalent linkage between CPP and nucleic acid

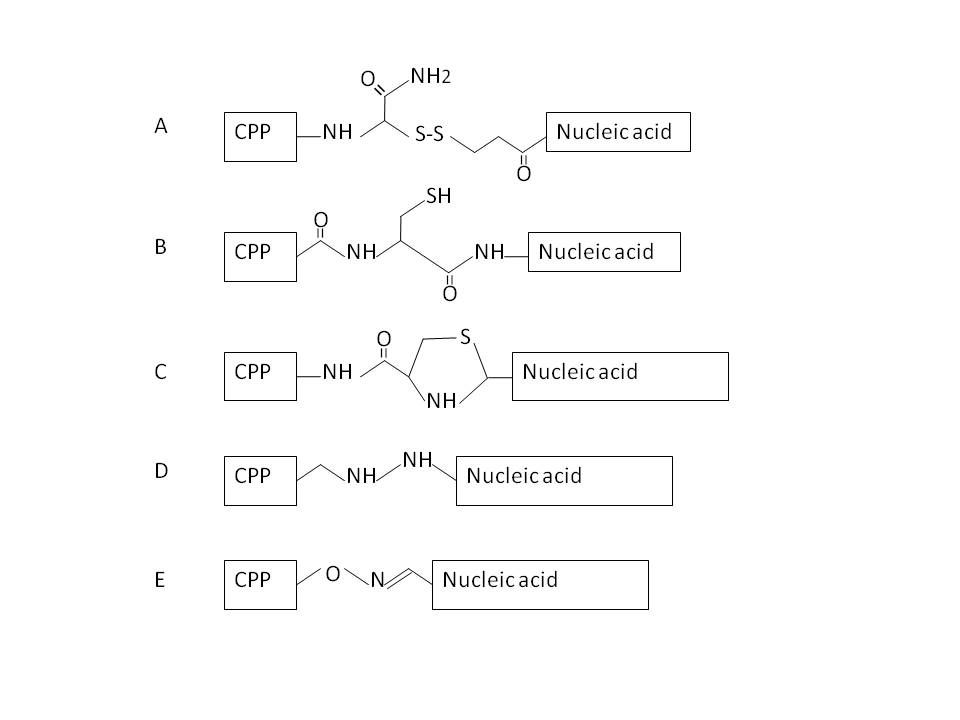
Covalent linkage between CPP and nucleic acid

Most CPP-nucleic acid complexes that have been proposed so far are formed through covalent bonding. A range of CPP-nucleic acid complexes have been synthesized through different chemistries that are either stable or cleavable linkages. And the most widely used method in publication is cleavable disulfide linkages through total stepwise solid-phase synthesis or solution-phase or solid-phase fragment coupling. Some other strategies like stable amide, thiazolidine, oxime and hydrazine linkage have also been developed. However, those covalent linking methods are limited by the concern that the synthetic covalent bond between CPP and nucleic acid may alter the biological activity of the latter. Thus, a new non-covalent strategy requiring no chemical modification with short amphipathic CPPs, like MPG and Pep-1 as carriers has been successfully applied for delivery of cargoes. These non-covalent conjugates are formed through either electrostatic or hydrophobic interactions. With this method, cargoes such as nucleic acids and proteins could be efficiently delivered while maintaining full biological activity.

==== siRNA delivery ====
Short interfering RNA (siRNA) is a powerful new tool that can interfere with and silence the expression of specific disease gene. To improve cellular uptake of siRNA, CPP strategies have been applied to facilitate the delivery of siRNA into cells through either covalent or non-covalent linkages. In one study, siRNA is covalently linked to transportation and penetration by disulfide-linkage at 5'-end of the sense strands of siRNA to target luciferase or eGFP mRNA reporters. In another study, TAT-siRNA conjugate through a stable thiomaleimide linkage at 3'-end of siRNA was delivered into HeLa cells for eGFP gene silencing.

However, non-covalent strategies appear to be better for siRNA delivery with a more significant biological response. In one study, MPG/siRNA complexes formed through stable non-covalent strategy showed successful introduction of siRNA into cultured cells and induced robust regulation of target mRNA. Furthermore, MPG/siRNA complexes have also been applied for delivery of siRNA in vivo into mouse blastocytes for gene regulation. MPG forms stable complexes with siRNA with a low degradation rate and can be easily functionalized for specific targeting, which are major advantages compared with the covalent CPP technology.

==== New substrate design for siRNA delivery ====
siRNA cell delivery represent a valuable tool for treatment of cancer disease, viral infections and genetic disorders. However, classical strategies involve covalent linking of cargo molecules and CPPs, which does not provide efficient protection of siRNA molecules in vivo; thus results reported in literature are not consistent. Recently, non-covalent strategies have been successfully reported. Secondary amphipathic peptides based on aromatic tryptophan and arginine residues linked with lysine as spacer have been reported under the name of CADY. CADY contains a short peptide sequence of 20 amino acids, with the sequence "Ac-GLWRALWRLLRSLWRLLWRA-cysteamide." This peptide is able to self-assemble in a helical shape with hydrophilic and hydrophobic residues on different side of the molecule, it has two different orientations of the surface that represent the lowest energy and it is able to form complexes with siRNA at different molar ratio varying from 1:1 to 80:1. CADY is able to form a shield around siRNA molecule protecting it from biodegradative processes that may occur before cellular penetration occurs. These types of substrates may present important applications in vivo.

==== Antisense oligomer delivery ====
Antisense oligonucleotides (asONs) have been used in basic research and are being developed as possible medical treatments. CPP strategies have been developed to deliver antisense oligomers such as PNA and PMO into cells. Overcoming the repulsion by the cell membrane of negative-charged ONs and the degradation of asONs by enzymes, CPPs increase asONs bioavailability. Two types of neutral ON analogues, peptide nucleic acid (PNA) and phosphorodiamidate morpholino oligomers (PMO or Morpholino) are becoming dominant in this area. PNA has been conjugated with various CPPs either through disulfide linkages or through stable amide bonds. For example, antisense activity within cells that blocked expression of the galanin receptor was observed when a 21-mer PNA was coupled to the penetratin. Results on antiviral activity with PNA targeting HIV-1 have also been reported through disulfide linkage with TAT. CPP-PMO conjugates have also been successfully used to inhibit the replication of several viruses such as SARS and influenza and attachment of CPPs has improved the efficacy of splice-modifying Morpholinos in development for treatment of Duchenne muscular dystrophy

==== Decoy DNA delivery ====
Decoy DNA is an exogenous double-strand DNA (dsDNA), which can mimic a promoter sequence that can inhibit the activity of a specific transcription factor. But dsDNA has the same problem as other therapeutics, poor bioavailability. In one study, CPPs TP and TP10 were coupled to NFкB decoy DNA, which blocked the effect of interleukin-1-induced NFкB activation and IL-6 gene expression. In another study, TP10 coupled Myc decoy DNA decreased proliferative capacity of N2a cells.

==== Plasmid delivery ====
Individual genes can be inserted into specific sites on plasmids, and recombinant plasmids can be introduced into living cells. A method using macro-branched TAT has been proposed for plasmid DNA delivery into various cell lines and showed significant transfection capabilities. Multimers of TAT have been found to increase transfection efficiency of plasmid DNA by 6-8 times more than poly-L-arginine or mutant TAT2-M1, and by 390 times compared with the standard vectors.

=== Protein delivery ===
The development of therapeutic proteins that has presented a valuable method to treat diseases is limited by low efficiency of traditional delivery methods. The evaluation of cytosolic delivery of CPP linked proteins has been found to be prone to artifacts and therefore requires the use of evaluation methods that distinguish true cytosolic delivery from cell surface attached or endosomally entrapped CPP-proteins. Recently, several methods using CPPs as vehicles to deliver biologically active, full-length proteins into living cells and animals have been reported.

Several groups have successfully delivered CPP fused proteins in vitro. TAT was able to deliver different proteins, such as horseradish peroxidase and RNase A across cell membrane into the cytoplasm in different cell lines in vitro. The size range of proteins with effective delivery is from 30kDa to 120-150kDa. In one study, TAT-fused proteins are rapidly internalized by lipid raft−dependent macropinocytosis using a transducible TAT−Cre recombinase reporter assay on live cells. In another study, a TAT-fused protein was delivered into mitochondria of breast cancer cells and decreased the survival of breast cancer cells, which showed capability of TAT-fusion proteins to modulate mitochondrial function and cell survival. Moreover, cR10, a cyclic poly-arginine CPP, enabled the endocytose independent transduction of antigen binding proteins through the cellular membrane with immediate bioavailability. Thereby, the authors of the study were able to deliver fluorescent antigen binding proteins into cells facilitating live-cell immunostaining. However, few in vivo studies have succeeded. In one study, in vivo delivery of TAT- or penetratin-crosslinked Fab fragments yielded varied organ distributions and an overall increase in organ retention, which showed tissue localization.

A non-covalent method that forms CPP/protein complexes has also been developed to address the limitations in covalent methods, such as chemical modification before crosslinking, and denaturation of proteins before delivery. In one study, a short amphipathic peptide carrier, Pep-1, and protein complexes have proven effective for delivery. It was shown that Pep-1 could facilitate rapid cellular uptake of various peptides, proteins, and even full-length antibodies with high efficiency and less toxicity. This approach has greatly simplified the formulation of reagents.

=== Contrast agent transport ===
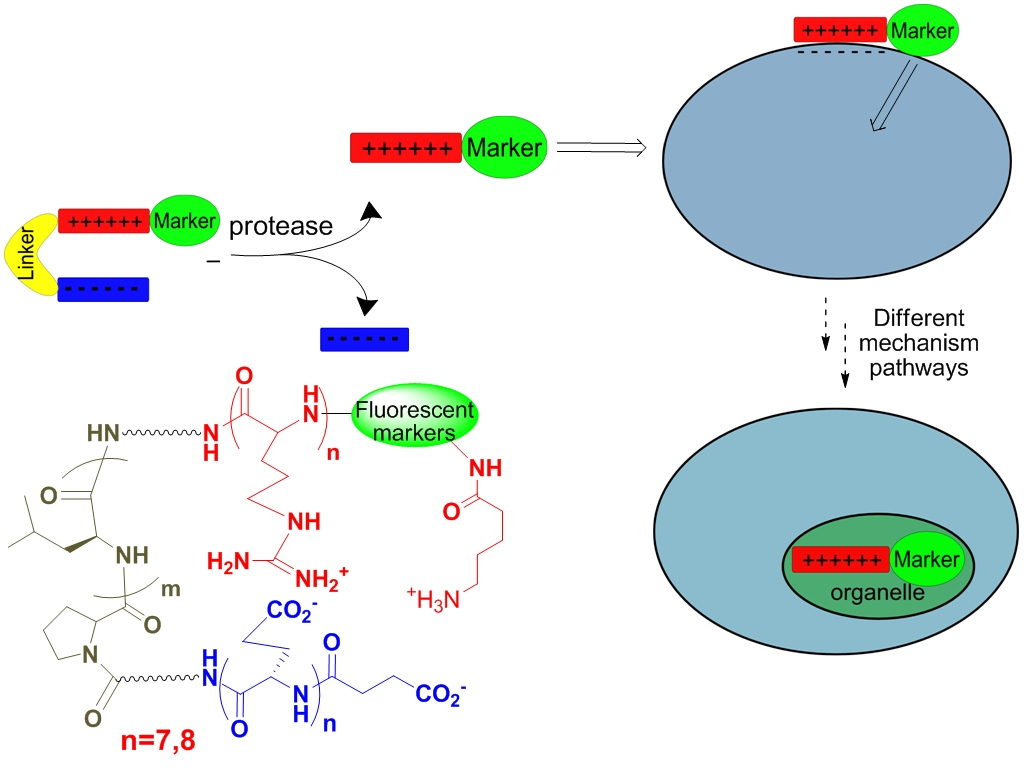
An improved substrate for CPP that minimize the proteolysis effects

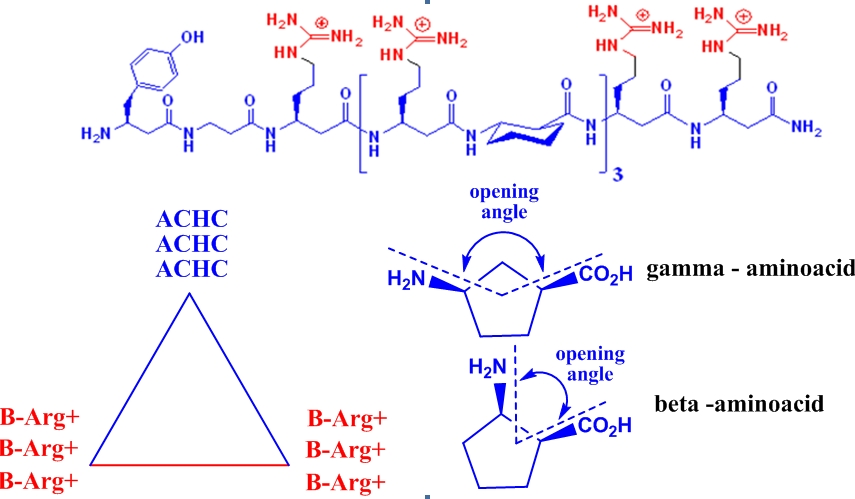
Folding control of CPP using unnatural β, δ cyclic amino acids

CPPs found applications as transporters of contrast agents across plasma membranes. These contrast agents are able to label the tumor cells, making the compounds important tools in cancer diagnosis; they are also used in in vivo and in vitro cellular experiments. The most important classes of CPP are isolated from viruses, such as TAT (transactivated-transcription) derived from HIV-1, penetratin, and transportan. The most widely used CPPs are based on TAT derivatives. TAT is an arginine-rich CPP. Several improvements for this substrate includes the usage of unnatural β or γ amino acids. This strategy offers multiple advantages, such resistance to proteolytic degradation, a natural degradation process by which peptide bonds are hydrolyzed to amino acids. Unnatural acid insertion in the peptide chain has multiple advantages. It facilitates the formation of stable foldamers with distinct secondary structure. β-Peptides are conformationally more stable in aqueous solution than naturally occurring peptides, especially for small chains. The secondary structure is reinforced by the presence of a rigid β-amino acid, which contains cyclohexane or cyclopentane fragments. These fragments generate a more rigid structure and influence the opening angle of the foldamer. These features are important for new peptide design. Helical β-peptides mimic antimicrobial activities of host defense peptides. This feature requires the orientation of cationic –hydrophilic on one side, and hydrophobic residues on the other side of the helix. The attachment of fluorescent group on one head of the molecule confers contrast properties. A new strategy to enhance the cellular up-take capacity of CPP is based on association of polycationic and polyanionic domains that are separated by a linker. Cellular association of polycationic residues (polyarginine) with negatively charged membrane cells is effectively blocked by the presence of polyanionic residue (poly-glutamic acid) and the linker, which confer the proper distance between these two charged residues in order to maximize their interaction. These peptides adopt hairpin structure, confirmed by overhauser effect correlation for proton-proton proximities of the two charged moieties. At this stage only the linker is exposed to protease hydrolysis in vivo applications. The linker hydrolysis occur and the two charged fragments experience more conformational freedom. In the absence of linker, the cationic peptide can interact more efficient with the target cell and cellular uptake occurs before proteolysis. This strategy found applications in labeling tumor cells in vivo. Tumor cells were marked in minutes. Linker degradation can be predicted by the amount of D-aminoacids (the unnatural isomer) incorporated in the peptide chain, this restricts in vivo proteolysis to the central linker.

==== Contrast agents as cargo molecules ====
===== Quantum dots =====
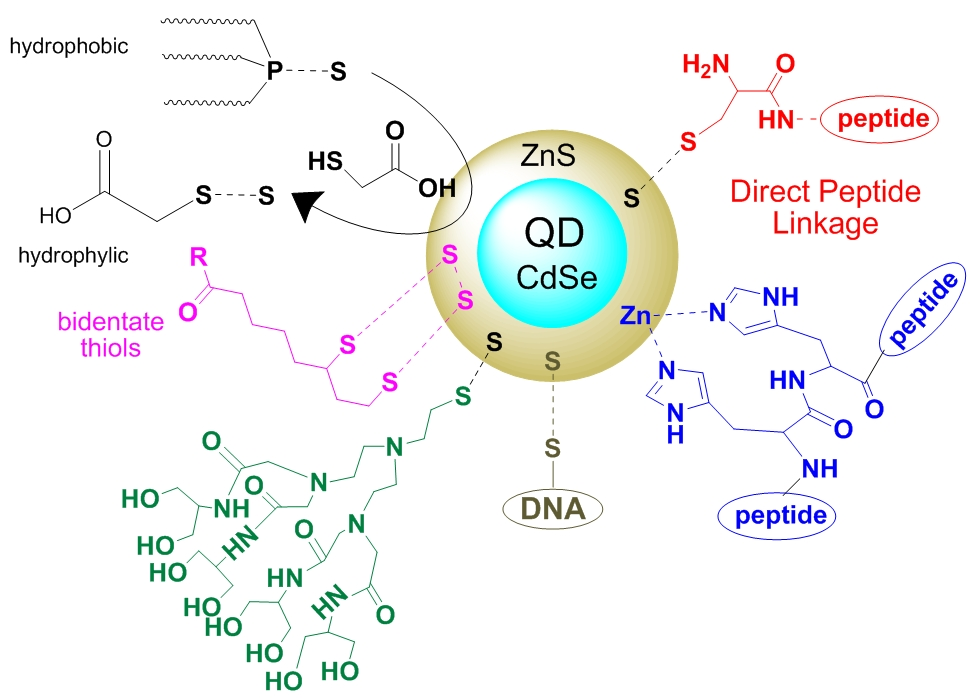
Quantum dots applications as cell labeling

Quantum dots (QD) represent a relative new class of fluorescent probes that have superior optical properties than classical organic dyes based on fluorescent groups. The main advantages of QD include high quantum yields, broad absorption spectra, size-tunable emission spectra, and good resistance to chemical and photochemical degradation. In vivo tests have shown that several positively charged peptides (based on guanidine residues) are able to cross cell membranes and to promote cellular uptake of attached molecules including quantum dots. QD properties can be easily modified by changing the organic substrates linked to them, offering a versatile biological tool as cell markers. Research is in progress to optimize the methodologies for the intracellular delivery of QD and QD bioconjugates, and characterization of long-term in vivo photophysical properties.

Quantum dots are colloidal nanocrystals, based on a cadmium-selenium (CdSe) core covered with a zinc-sulfur (ZnS) layer. This substrate has been used intensively as a cellular marker because CdSe emits in the visible domain and is an excellent contrast agent, while the ZnS layer protects the core from oxidation and also the leeching of CdSe into the surrounding solution. This strategy also improves the photo-luminescence yield. The properties can be tuned by the thickness of the ZnS protective layers. Colloidal QD emission can be modulated from UV-Vis to the infrared by using different types of coating agents, such as ZnS, CdS, ZnSe, CdTe and PbSe. The properties of quantum dots can be also tuned by the synthetic scheme, high temperature solvent/ligand mixtures that influence the nanocrystal properties. High-quality QD contrast agents are obtained at elevated temperatures; however, because they have lower water solubility, their usage as cell markers is limited. Further functionalization with hydrophilic ligands is required.

The advantages of QD are represented by their fast action; they are able to label a target tissue or cell in seconds. In vivo studies show that QD are able to selectively label cancer cells, and they accumulate at tumor sites. Tumor cells labeled with QD can be tracked with multiphoton microscopy as they invade lung tissue. In both studies, spectral imaging and autofluorescent subtraction allowed multicolour in vivo visualization of cells and tissues. A major drawback of QD is their relatively high toxicity. Functionalizations with different substrates that increase bioaffinity and decrease toxicity are in progress. For instance, sulfur from the QD shell is able to form reversible disulfide bonds with a wide class of organic compounds.

==== Magnetic resonance imaging ====
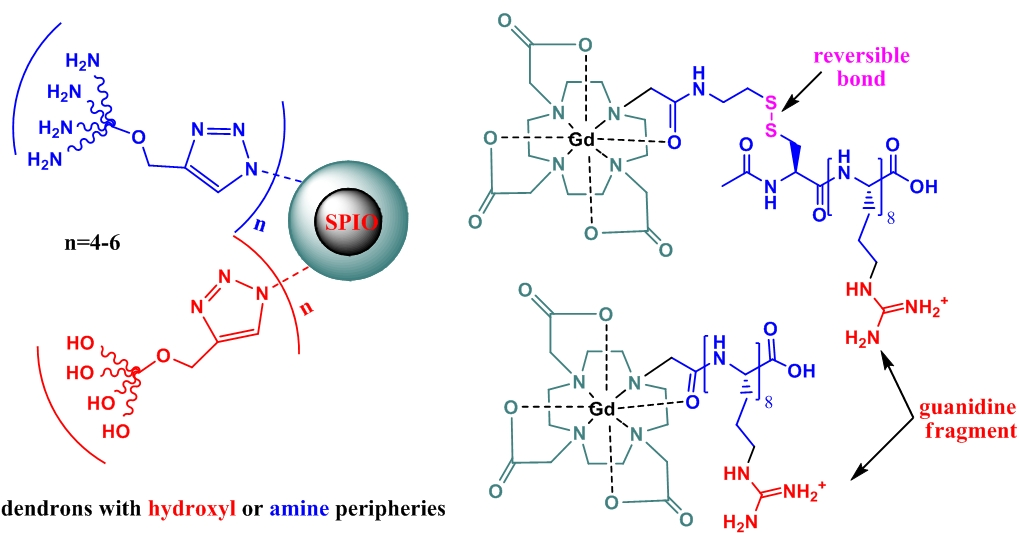
Examples of metal chelates successfully delivered into cells

Magnetic resonance imaging (MRI) is a powerful tool for disease diagnosis such as cancer metastasis and inflammation, using different metal chelates. Metal chelates increase the contrast signal between normal and diseased tissues by catalyzing the relaxation of water protons in their proximities. Typical examples are Gd3+ low-molecular-weight chelates, and superparamagnetic iron oxide (SPIO). In vivo administration of these agents allows the labeling of tumor cells; or cells can be labeled in vitro with contrast agents and then they can be injected and monitored in vivo by using MRI techniques.

SPIO nanoparticles confer high sensitivity in MRI but they have lower affinity for cells; they work at high concentrations. Functionalizations of these compounds using dendrimeric guanidines showed similar activities as TAT-based CPPs but higher toxicity. New substrates based on dendrons with hydroxyl or amine peripheries show low toxicity. Applications of SPIO includes cell labeling in vivo; due to low toxicity, they are clinically approved for use in liver, spleen, and gastrointestinal imaging.

The presence of octamer arginine residues allows cell membrane transduction of various cargo molecules including peptides, DNA, siRNA, and contrast agents. However, the ability of cross membrane is not unidirectional; arginine-based CPPs are able to enter-exit the cell membrane, displaying an overall decreasing concentration of contrast agent and a decrease of magnetic resonance (MR) signal in time. This limits their application in vivo. To solve this problem, contrast agents with disulfide, reversible bond between metal chelate and transduction moiety enhance the cell-associated retention. The disulfide bond is reduced by the target cell environment and the metal chelate remains trapped in the cytoplasm, increasing the retention time of chelate in the target cell.
