= W. Harmon Ray =

American academic

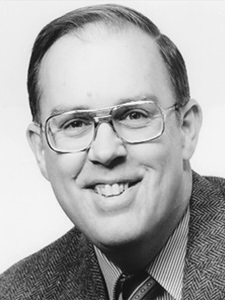
- Harmon in 1973
- Born: April 4, 1940 (age 86); Washington, D.C., U.S.
- Education: Rice University (BS); University of Minnesota (PhD)
- Awards: Amundson Award (2019); Richard E. Bellman Control Heritage Award (2000); Guggenheim Fellowship (1973)
- Scientific career
- Fields: Mathematical modeling, Control theory, Process optimization, Chemical reaction engineering, Polymerization processes
- Workplaces: University of Wisconsin–Madison; University at Buffalo; University of Waterloo
- Doctoral advisor: Rutherford Aris
- Doctoral students: Over 50 students

Willis Harmon Ray (born April 4, 1940) is an American chemical engineer, control theorist, applied mathematician, and a Vilas Research emeritus professor at the University of Wisconsin–Madison notable for being the 2000 winner of the prestigious Richard E. Bellman Control Heritage Award and the 2019 winner of the Neal Amundson Award.

== Education ==
Harmon earned his bachelor's degree in chemical engineering in 1963 from Rice University; and his PhD in chemical engineering in 1966 from the University of Minnesota, under supervision of Professor Rutherford Aris.

== Academic career ==
Harmon served as faculty member at the department of chemical engineering at the University of Waterloo (1966–1970), State University of New York at Buffalo (1970–1976), and the University of Wisconsin–Madison (after 1976). He retired and became an emeritus faculty member at the University of Wisconsin in 2003. During his tenure as a faculty member, Harmon supervised 53 PhD and 30 master's students.

== Research interests ==
- Mathematical modeling
- Control theory
- Process optimization
- Chemical reaction engineering
- Polymerization processes

== Awards ==
- Neal Amundson Award, ISCRE (2019)
- Gerhard Damkohler Medaille, DECHEMA/GVC, Germany (2006)
- DEng (honoris causa), University of Waterloo (2003)
- DSc (honoris causa), University of Minnesota (2001)
- Richard E. Bellman Control Heritage Award, American Automatic Control Council (2000)
- Ray was elected a member of the National Academy of Engineering in 1991 for leadership in research and education in polymer reaction engineering, chemical reaction dynamics, process optimization, and automatic and control in industrial applications of significant importance.
- John R. Ragazzini Award, American Automatic Control Council (1989)
- Professional Progress Award, AIChE (1982)
- Automatica Prize Paper Award, International Federation of Automatic Control (1981)
- Arthur K. Doolittle Award, Organics Coatings and Plastics Division of the American Chemical Society (1981)
- J. Simon Guggenheim Memorial Fellowship (1973–74)

== Selected publications ==
- Lo, Dennis P. and W. H. Ray. "Kinetic Modeling and Prediction of Polymer Properties for Ethylene Polymerization over Nickel-Diimine Catalysts". I&EC Research, 44, 5932–5949 (2005).
- Wells, G. J. and W. H. Ray. "Mixing Effects on Performance and Stability of Low-density Polyethylene Reactors ". AIChE Journal, 51, 3205–3218, (2005).
- Banaszak, Brian, D. P. Lo, T. Widya, W. H. Ray, J. J. de Pablo, A. Novak, and Juraj Kosek, "Ethylene and 1-Hexene Sorption in LLDPE under Typical Gas Phase Reactor Conditions: A priori Simulation and Modeling for Prediction of Experimental Observations", Macromolecules, 37, 9139–9150 (2004).
- Zhang, M. and W. H. Ray. "Modeling of "Living" Free-Radical Polymerization Processes. I. Batch, Semi batch, and Continuous Tank Reactors". Journal of Applied Polymer Science, 86, 1630–1662 (2002).
- Yao, Zhen and W. H. Ray. "Modeling and Analysis of New Processes for Polyester and Nylon Production". AIChE Journal, 47, 401–412 (2001).
- Beers, Kenneth C. and W. H. Ray. "A Linkage Moment Approach to Modeling Condensation Polymerization with Multiple Monomers. I. Linear Polymers". Journal of Applied Polymer Science, 79, 246–265 (2001).
- Villa, Carlos M. and W. H. Ray. "Nonlinear Dynamics Found in Polymerization Processes – A Review". Chemical Engineering Science, 55, 2, 275–290 (1999).
- Mallon, Frederick K. and W. H. Ray. "Modeling of Solid-State Polycondensation. II. Reactor Design Issues". Journal of Applied Polymer Science, 69, 1775–1788(1998).
- Shaffer, W. K. A. and W. H. Ray. "Polymerization of Olefins Through Heterogeneous Catalysis. XVIII. A Kinetic Explanation for Unusual Effects". Journal of Applied Polymer Science, 65, 1053–1080 (1997).
- Debling, J. A., J. J. Zacca and W. H. Ray. "Reactor Residence-Time Distribution Effects on the Multistage Polymerization of Olefins. Part III. Multi-layered Products – Impact Polypropylene". Chemical Engineering Science, 52, 12, 1969–2001 (1997).
- Hyanek, I., J. Zacca, F. Teymour, and W. H. Ray. "Dynamics and Stability of Polymerization Process Flow Sheets". I&EC Research, 34, 11, 3872–3877 (1995).
- Semino, Daniele and W. H. Ray. "Control of Systems Described by Population Balance Equations – II. Emulsion Polymerization with Constrained Control Action". Chemical Engineering Science, 50, 11, 1825–1839 (1995).
- Gay, David H. and W. H. Ray. "Identification and Control of Distributed Parameter Systems by Means of the Singular Value Decomposition". Chemical Engineering Science, 50, 10, 1519–1539 (1995).
- Paquet, D. A., Jr. and W. H. Ray. "Tubular Reactors for Emulsion Polymerization: I. Experimental Investigation". AIChE Journal, 40, 1, 73–87 (1994).
- Scott, G. M. and W. H. Ray. "Experiences with Model-Based Controllers Based on Neural Network Process Models". J. Proc. Cont. 3, 3 179–196 (1993).
- Jacobsen, L. L. and W. H. Ray. "Unified Modeling for Polycondensation Kinetics". J. Macromolecular Science Reviews in Macromolecular Chemistry and Physics, C32 (3 & 4), 407–519 (1992).
- Jerome, N. F. and W. H. Ray. "Model-Predictive Control of Linear Multivariable Systems Having Time Delays and Right-Half-Plane Zeros." Chemical Engineering Science, 47, 4, 763–785 (1992).
- Hutchinson, R. A. and W. H. Ray. "Polymerization of Olefins through Heterogeneous Catalysis. VIII. Monomer Sorption Effects". J. of Applied Polymer Sci., Vol. 41, 51–81 (1990).
- Stevens, C. J. and W. H. Ray. "The Mathematical Modeling of Bulk and Solution Polymerization in a Tubular Reactor". ACS Symposium Series No. 404
- Computer Applications in Applied Polymer Science II: Automation, Modeling, and Simulation, Chapter 28. American Chemical Society (1989).
- Rawlings, J.B. and W.H. Ray. "Emulsion Polymerization Reactor Stability:Simplified Model Analysis." AIChE J., 33, 1663–1677 (1987).
- Hutchinson, R.A. and W.H. Ray. "Polymerization of Olefins Through Heterogeneous Catalysis. VII. Particle Ignition and Extinction Phenomena." J. Appl. Poly. Sci., 34, 657–676 (1987).
- Choi, K.-Y. and W.H. Ray. "The Dynamic Behavior of Fluidized Bed Reactors for Solid Catalysed Gas Phase Olefin Polymerization." Chem. Eng. Sci., 40, 2261 (1985).
- Schork, F.J and W.H. Ray. "On-line Measurement of Surface Tension and Density with Applications to Emulsion Polymerization." J. Appl. Poly. Sci., 28, 407 (1983).
- Jensen, K.F. and W.H. Ray. "The Bifurcation Behavior of Tubular Reactors." Chem. Eng. Sci., 37, 199 (1982).
- Ogunnaike, B.A. and W.H. Ray. "Computer-aided Multivariable Control System Design for Processes with Time Delays." Computers and Chem. Eng., 6, 311 (1982).
- Greiss, F.K. and W.H. Ray. "State Estimation and Feedback Control of Process having Moving Boundaries – An Experimental Study." Proceedings 1979 Joint Automatic Control Conference (June 1979). Also published in Automatica, 16, 157 (1980).
- Lausterer, G.K., W.H. Ray and H.R. Martens. "The Real Time Application of Distributed Parameter State Estimation Theory to a Two Dimensional Heated Ingot." Proceedings 2nd IFAC Symposium on Distributed Parameter Control Systems, Coventry, England (June 1977).
- Also Automatica, 14, 335 (1978).
- Uppal, A., W.H. Ray and A.B. Poore. "The Classification of the Dynamic Behavior of Continuous Stirred Tank Reactors – Influence of Reactor Residence Time." Chemical Engineering Science, 31, 205 (1976).
- Uppal, A., W.H. Ray and A. Poore. "On the Dynamic Behavior of Continuous Stirred Tank Reactors." Chem. Eng. Sci., 29, 967 (1974).
- Ajinkya, M.B., M. Köhne, H.F. Mäder and W.H. Ray. "The Experimental Implementation of a Distributed Parameter Filter." Automatica, 11, 571 (1975).
- Min, K.W. and W.H. Ray. "On the Mathematical Modelling of Emulsion Polymerization Reactors." J. Macro. Sci-Revs. Macro. Chem., C11, 177 (1974).
- Ray, W.H. "On the Mathematical Modelling of Polymerization Reactors." J. Macromol. Sci.-Revs. Macromol. Chem., C8, 1–56 (1972).
- Soliman, M.A. and W.H. Ray. "Optimal Feedback Control for Linear-quadratic Systems Having Time Delay." Int. J. Control, 15, 609–627 (1972).
- Ogunye, A.F. and W.H. Ray. "The Optimization of Cyclic Tubular Reactors with Catalyst Decay." IEC Proc. Des. Dev., 10, 410–416 (1971).
- Ray, W.H. "Periodic Operation of Polymerization Reactors." IEC Proc.Des. Dev., 7, 422–426 (1968).
