= Dan Luss =

American chemical engineer (born 1938)

- Born: May 5, 1938 (age 88); U.S.
- Education: University of Minnesota; Technion Israel Institute of Technology
- Known for: Dynamics of chemical reactors Steady-state multiplicity, Modeling of multi-reaction systems, Complex reacting systems
- Awards: Alan P. Colburn Award (AIChE, 1972); National Academy of Engineering (1984); Wilhelm Award (AIChE, 1986)
- Scientific career
- Fields: Chemical Engineer
- Workplaces: University of Houston
- Doctoral advisor: Neal Amundson

Dan Luss (born May 5, 1938) is an American chemical engineer, who is the Cullen Professor of Chemical Engineering at the University of Houston. He is known for his work in chemical reaction engineering, complex reacting systems, multiple steady-states reactor design, dynamics of chemical reactors, and combustion.

== Career ==
Luss received a Bachelor of Science degree in 1960 and Master of Science in chemical engineering in 1963 from Technion-Israel Institute of Technology in Haifa, Israel. In 1966, he received a Ph.D from the University of Minnesota in chemical engineering, with a thesis on reaction engineering supervised by Professor Neal Amundson. In 1966, he served one year as assistant professor of chemical engineering at the University of Minnesota Department of Chemical Engineering and Materials Science.

In 1967, Luss joined the chemical engineering department at the University of Houston as an assistant professor. Promotion to associate professor (1969-1972) and professor (1972–present) preceded his appointment as Cullen Professor in 1984. He served as chairmen of its department of chemical engineering first from 1975 to 1995 and again from 1999-2000, and as associate director of the Texas Center for Superconductivity at the University of Houston in 1988. He completely or jointly supervised nearly 75 Ph.D. and master's theses, and published well over 200 journal articles.

== Research ==
Luss' research has been primarily in the causes of steady-state multiplicity and dynamics of chemical reactors. This research led to improvements in the safer operation of industrial reactors and to a more reliable development and operation of novel reactor types. He also made contributions to the modeling of multi-reaction systems leading to many follow-up studies.

His group is currently conducting research on several topics. The main emphasis is on problem related to the reduction of environmental emissions from diesel engines. These include enhancement of the efficiency and safety of the regeneration diesel particulate filters, development of novel catalyst architectures which improve the destruction of NOx and organic compounds emitted by diesel engines. We also conduct studies of novel synthesis of solid oxides and the dynamic features of the combustion of solid nano-particles. Specific research projects include:

=== Combustion of soot in diesel particulate filters ===
A major research activity in his Department is the reduction of NOx emissions in the oxidizing exhaust emissions of diesel engines. This reduction may be conducted by use of selective Catalytic reduction catalyst (SCR) which required feed of ammonia precursor or by use of Lean NOx Trap (LNT) which contains expensive precious metals. Another option is the use a reactor with LNT catalyst followed by one with SCR to avoid the need to inject ammonia precursors. Luss and colleagues are conducting both experimental and simulation studies of novel catalyst architecture with goal to enable a reduction of the expensive precious metal without affecting the effectiveness of the NOx destruction.

=== Development of novel catalyst architecture ===
The presence of excessive high local temperatures (hot spots) can severely damage chemical reactors and monolith reactors used to destruct environmental pollutants. There is a technological to detect the amplitude and motion of small hot zones the location of which is not known and which may meander with time. Dan Luss and colleagues have recently developed a novel technique for measuring the spatio-temporal temperature, which measures continuously the temporal temperature profile along a special optical fiber. The technique is currently used to measure the temperature profiles in a monolith reactor and a packed bed reactor in which several reactions are conducted. This novel technique is expected to lead to major advances in the measurements and control of temperature in chemical reactors and provide essential information that could not have been obtained until now.

=== Nanoparticle synthesis and pressure release during their combustion ===
Luss and colleagues have developed a novel method for the synthesis of solid oxides by having a high temperature front propagate through a mixture of carbon and some minerals. The method (which has a 2 mm spatial resolution and temperature resolution of 0.5 C) enables a more economic synthesis than do other methods. Moreover, it can be used directly to produce nano-particles. Luss and co-workers currently conduct studies on the impact of the operating conditions and reactants mixture composition on the product properties and the magnitude of the amplitude and duration of the pressure pulse generated by the released gaseous products and its dependence on the nano particles size.

== Honors ==
Luss was awarded the Alan P. Colburn Award by the American Institute of Chemical Engineers in 1972 and elected to the National Academy of Engineering (NAE) in 1984. He was awarded the Wilhelm Award by the American Institute of Chemical Engineers in 1986 and became an AIChE Fellow in 1990. In 2005, he was awarded the Founders Award by the American Institute of Chemical Engineers (AIChE). In 2010, he was awarded the Near R. Amundson Award for Excellence in Chemical Reaction Engineering, which was awarded at the 2010 ISCRE symposium in Philadelphia, PA. In addition, he has served as editor for numerous publications including Reviews in Chemical Engineering, Industrial Engineering Chemical Research, Catalysis Reviews – Science and Engineering, and AIChE Journal.

== Key publications ==
Dan Luss has authored numerous journal articles describing significant advances in chemical reaction engineering which includes but is not limited to:

- Dan Luss, Neal R. Amundson, "Uniqueness of the steady state solutions for chemical reactor occurring in a catalyst particle or in a tubular reaction with axial diffusion", Chemical Engineering Science 22(3), 253-266, (1967).
- William E. Corbett Jr., Dan Luss, "The influence of non-uniform catalytic activity on the performance of a single spherical pellet", Chemical Engineering Science 29(6), 1473-1483, (1974).
- Constantine A. Pikios, Dan Luss, "Isothermal concentration oscillations on catalytic surfaces", Chemical Engineering Science 32(2), 191-194 (1977).
- Vemuri Balakotaiah, Dan Luss, "Global analysis of the multiplicity features of multi-reaction lumped-parameter systems", Chemical Engineering Science 39(5), 865-881 (1984).
- Karen S Martirosyan, and Dan Luss,"Carbon combustion synthesis of complex oxides: Process demonstration and features", AIChE journal, 51,10, 2801–2810, (2005).
- Karen S Martirosyan, K Chen, and Dan Luss, Behavior features of soot combustion in diesel particulate filter, Chemical Engineering Science 65 (1), 42-46, (2010).
- Samuel L. Lane and Dan Luss, "Rotating temperature pulse during hydrogen oxidation on a nickel ring", Physical Review Letters 70, 830 (1993).
- Ritchie, J T; Richardson, J T; Luss, Dan, "Ceramic membrane reactor for synthesis gas production", AIChE Journal 47(9), 2092 (2001).
- Yang Zheng, Yi Liu, Michael P. Harold, Dan Luss, "LNT–SCR dual-layer catalysts optimized for lean NOx reduction by H2 and CO", Applied Catalysis B: Environmental 148, 311-321 (2014).
- Hoang Nguyen, Michael P. Harold, Dan Luss, "Spatiotemporal behavior of Pt/Rh/CeO2/BaO catalyst during lean–rich cycling", Chemical Engineering Journal 262, 464-477 (2015).
