= Froment =

Froment is a French surname. Notable people with the surname include:

- Antoine Froment, Protestant reformer in Geneva
- Jules Froment, French neurologist
- Louis de Froment, French orchestral conductor
- Nicolas Froment, fifteenth-century French painter
- Paul-Gustave Froment, early French electrical engineer
- Pierre Froment (disambiguation), fictional characters
- Pierre de Froment, French member of the resistance during World War II and subsequently General
- Gilbert Froment, Professor Emeritus of Chemical Engineering at Ghent University, Belgium
