= Rutherford Aris =

British-American chemical engineer and control theorist

- Rutherford Aris
- Born: September 15, 1929; Bournemouth, UK
- Died: November 2, 2005 (aged 76); Edina, Minnesota, US
- Citizenship: American
- Education: University of London (BSc, PhD)
- Awards: Amundson Award (ISCRE, 1998); Richard E. Bellman Control Heritage Award (1992); Guggenheim Fellowship (1971)
- Scientific career
- Fields: Mathematical modeling, Control theory, Process optimization, Chemical reaction engineering, Catalysis

Rutherford "Gus" Aris (September 15, 1929 – November 2, 2005) was a chemical engineer, control theorist, applied mathematician, and a regents professor emeritus of chemical engineering at the University of Minnesota (1958–2005).

== Early life ==
Aris was born in Bournemouth, England, to Algernon Aris and Janet (Elford). From a young age, Aris was interested in chemistry. Aris's father owned a photo-finishing works, where he would experiment with chemicals and reactions. He attended St Martin's, a small local kindergarten and moved to St Wulfran's, a local preparatory school, now Queen Elizabeth's School. Here, he studied Latin (a skill he would make much use of later in his life) and was encouraged to continue pursuing his interest in chemistry. Because of his achievements, he was referred to the Reverend C. B. Canning, Headmaster of Canford School, a well-known public school, close to Wimborne. On the strength of this interview, he was given a place in the newly created house that the school had provided for day-boarders. This was in 1943, when he was 14. His mathematics teacher, H. E. Piggott, had a particular influence on Aris due to "the liveliness, enthusiasm, and care that he brought to his teaching", which "were unparalleled in my experience". Piggot spent substantial time on pure and applied mathematical papers, an experience that Aris described as "extraordinary". Aris dedicated his book Discrete Dynamic Programming to Piggot 15 years later.

== Industry experience ==
=== Imperial Chemical Industries ===
Piggot helped Aris to get a job working for Imperial Chemical Industries (ICI) as a laboratory technician in the Mechanical Engineering Department of the Research Labs, at the age of 17. While working at ICI, Aris attended the University of London part-time to work toward his B.Sc. Aris described this as "an excellent way to get a degree, although perhaps not so good a way of getting an education." After 2 years Aris made an attempt to earn the B.Sc. Honours Degree. He sat 12 papers (exams) covering a wide range of mathematical topics, and got a degree with first-class honours.

=== University of Edinburgh ===
In 1948, ICI sent him to Edinburgh, Scotland for two years of study at the Mathematical Institute at the University of Edinburgh, which was presided over by Alexander Aitken. Aris, who was accepted for post-graduate studies but not for a Ph.D., did post-graduate work at the university under the supervision of John Cossar. During this break from ICI, Aris also registered for a University of London M.Sc. in the area of mathematical analysis. When he sat the papers, however, he failed to get the degree.

=== ICI Billingham ===
In 1950, Aris returned to ICI and began working for C. H. Bosanquet in Billingham, England. Working with Bosanquet provided Aris the opportunity to work on a large variety of problems, including catalysis, heat transfer, gas scrubbing, and centrifuge design.

Aris was then promoted to Technical Officer, where he began working on chromatography. He utilized results from a paper on dispersion written by Geoffrey Taylor, and extended its results, ultimately writing a paper in 1955 that applied the method of moments to Taylor's approach. He submitted the paper to the Proceedings of the Royal Society, with help from Taylor (who was a Fellow of the Royal Society). Aris communicated with Taylor regarding dispersion and diffusion. In the meantime, however, he was transferred to a different division, where he began working on chemical reactor design. Frustrated with the transfer and with the proprietary nature of his commercial work, which made publishing work very difficult, he decided to move to a university, applying for several lectureship positions during 1954 and 1955 without success. Aris continued to work at ICI, focusing much of his efforts on mathematical modeling of adiabatic multi-bed reactors, a topic that was the central focus of an M.S. student at the University of Minnesota. In 1955, Neal Amundson of the University of Minnesota, who was on sabbatical at Cambridge, visited the ICI Research Department, where Aris was working. Amundson suggested to ICI, during his visit, that Aris be sent to the University of Minnesota in Minneapolis for a year of study. Several months later, Aris later met Amundson at Cambridge and told Amundson of his plans to leave ICI for academia, plans that he had not revealed to his superiors at ICI. Amundson offered Aris a research fellowship at the University of Minnesota, which Aris accepted. After notifying ICI of his intent to leave, he moved to Minneapolis, Minnesota at the end of 1955.

== Academic career ==
=== University of Minnesota research fellowship ===
Aris began working on chemically reacting laminar flow, applying Kummer's hypergeometric function to the problem, and control of a stirred tank reactor with some unusual properties. Both problems required the use of a computer to perform calculations, and Amundson provided Aris with a computer science graduate student with whom to work. Aris's research fellowship was extended for a second year, but shortly afterward, in October 1956, Aris was informed of a lectureship opening at the University of Edinburgh. He took advantage of the opportunity, and left immediately for Edinburgh.

=== University of Edinburgh lectureship ===
Aris was on the faculty of the University of Edinburgh for two years, 1956–1958. While at Edinburgh, Aris wrote papers on his work at the University of Minnesota and at ICI. Having the lectureship position allowed Aris to gain experience lecturing to students. He also attended the lectures of, and interacted with, the chair of chemical technology at the University of Edinburgh, Kenneth Denbigh, who was a well-known thermodynamicist and an editor of the journal Chemical Engineering Science.

=== University of Minnesota faculty ===
Aris returned to Minneapolis in the summer of 1957 to continue his work on the stirred tank reactor problem. In August he became engaged to Claire Holman, and when he informed Amundson, Amundson offered him a faculty position at the university. Aris accepted the job, and began working as an assistant professor at the University of Minnesota in 1958.

Aris had not formally received a Ph.D., but had registered three years earlier with the University of London, where he had earned his B.Sc., and which offered Ph.D. degrees by correspondence. A Ph.D. degree could be earned without following a strict preparation process; the individual needed to propose a research program after 3 years, select a committee of examiners, and submit a dissertation, and after an oral examination by and approval from the committee, the degree would be granted. Amundson had suggested Aris look into Richard Bellman's method of dynamic programming for his dissertation. Amundson informally served as Aris's advisor, and Aris completed his dissertation on the topic in 1960.

His dissertation was published by the Academic Press in a series of which Bellman was the editor, and Bellman took note of the dissertation. Aris and Amundson visited Bellman at the Rand Corporation, where Bellman was working on economic models. The dynamic programming method had originally been developed for economics, but Bellman was attracted by applications in engineering, and the meeting led to a joint collaboration and a publication.

Aris's research at the University of Minnesota focused on optimization, dynamic programming, control theory, Taylor diffusion, and computing engines. Aris also taught a graduate fluid mechanics course, and eventually wrote the book Vectors, tensors, and the basic equations of fluid mechanics in an effort to make the rational mechanics approach of Truesdell, Coleman, and others more accessible to students.

=== First Cambridge sabbatical ===
After he had been with the department for six years, Aris took a sabbatical at the Shell Department of Chemical Engineering at the University of Cambridge during the 1964–1965 academic year, where he was able to interact with many well-known engineers and mathematicians such as Geoffrey Taylor and John Littlewood. He also lectured in many places in Europe, including Brussels, Copenhagen, and Trondheim.

=== Second Cambridge sabbatical ===
Aris took a second sabbatical after 6 years, again going to the University of Cambridge, during the 1971–1972 academic year. He spent his time writing a monograph on mathematical models for porous catalysts, which he did not finish until 1973. During his sabbatical, he received financial support in the form of a Guggenheim grant. This also provided Aris an opportunity to participate in the board overseeing the formation and development of Los Alamos National Lab's Center for Nonlinear Studies, which allowed Aris the opportunity to travel to Los Alamos during the 1970s and 1980s.

=== Department chairmanship ===
In 1974, Neal Amundson, who had been the department chairman of the University of Minnesota's chemical engineering department for nearly 25 years, resigned from this position. Aris was appointed acting head of the department, while Amundson left Minnesota for the University of Houston. Aris acted as department chair for 4 years, and was relieved of the position in 1978. Coinciding with this was an offer from Princeton University to join the faculty there, as well as the offer to stay at the University of Minnesota and work half-time in the chemical engineering department and half-time in the paleography department. Aris decided to stay at the University of Minnesota.

=== Paleography ===
In addition to his interest in chemical engineering, Aris was also interested in the humanities. At the University of Minnesota, Aris was able to pursue his interest in paleography when he was granted a professorship in the Classics Department, where he taught classes and published books and research articles. Aris published his book Explicatio Formarum Literarum, or The Unfolding of Letterforms, which covered the history of written letters from the 1st century to the 15th century.

=== Further sabbaticals ===
Aris had several other sabbaticals over his 40-year career. Through the Fairchild Distinguished Scholar program at the California Institute of Technology, Aris was able to spend a portion of 1977 and a year in 1980–1981 on sabbatical in Pasadena, California. He dedicated a portion of his time to paleography, utilizing the nearby Huntington Library. Additionally, through a personal connection at the University of Leeds, Aris was able to spend several weeks there as Brotherton Professor in 1985. Aris spent his last sabbatical, from 1993–1994, at the Institute for Advanced Study at Princeton.

== Death ==
Aris penned many poems and anecdotes, many relating his difficulties with Parkinson's disease, from which Aris eventually died. Aris died on November 2, 2005, in Edina, Minnesota.

== Legacy ==
Over the course of his long academic career, Aris was a visiting professor at many institutions, including Cambridge University, the California Institute of Technology, and Princeton University; he authored 13 books and more than 300 chemical engineering research articles, and mentored 48 Ph.D. and 20 M.S. graduate students. Aris was well known for his research on mathematical modeling, chemical reactor and chemical process design, and distillation techniques, as well as his paleographic research.

After he had been department head for four years, in 1978 he was named Regents Professor. Some of the awards and honors earned by Aris include a Guggenheim Fellowship, election to the National Academy of Engineering in 1975 and the American Academy of Arts and Sciences in 1988. Aris was also a member of the American Chemical Society, the Society for Mathematical Biology, and the Society of Scribes and Illuminators, among others. Aris was awarded the Richard E. Bellman Control Heritage Award in 1992 for his contributions to the field of control theory. He was awarded the Neal R. Amundson Award for Excellence in Chemical Reaction Engineering by the International Symposia on Chemical Reaction Engineering in 1998.

In 2016, the board of the ISCRE (International Symposia on Chemical Reaction Engineering) established the Rutherford Aris Young Investigator Award for Excellence in Chemical Reaction Engineering. This award honors young researchers under the age of 40 to recognize outstanding contributions in experimental and/or theoretical reaction engineering research.

== Selected bibliography ==
=== Books ===
1. Aris, Rutherford (1961). The optimal design of chemical reactors: a study in dynamic programming. Academic Press.
2. Aris, Rutherford (1962). Vectors, tensors, and the basic equations of fluid mechanics. Prentice-Hall.
3. Aris, Rutherford (1964). Discrete dynamic programming: an introduction to the optimization of staged processes. Blaisdell.
4. Aris, Rutherford (1978). Mathematical Modeling Techniques. Pitman.
5. Aris, Rutherford (1989). Elementary Chemical Reactor Analysis (Butterworth's Series in Chemical Engineering) .Butterworth-Heinemann
6. Aris, Rutherford (1990). Explicatio Formarum Litterarum (The Unfolding of Letterforms from the First Century to the Fifteenth). Calligraphy Connection.
7. Aris, Rutherford (1999). Mathematical Modeling: A Chemical Engineer's Perspective. Academic Press.

=== Edited books ===
1. Amundson, Neal R. (1980). Aris, Rutherford; Varma, A. (eds.). The Mathematical Understanding of Chemical Engineering Systems – Selected Papers of Neal R. Amundson. Pergamon Press.

== Footnotes ==
- Aris, Rutherford (1999). Mathematical Modeling: A Chemical Engineer's Perspective. Academic Press.
- Anderson, D. v. A. (2006), "Professor Rutherford 'Gus' Aris: 1929–2005 [Obituary]", Letter Arts Review, 21 (1)
- "In memoriam: Rutherford Aris". University of Minnesota College of Science and Engineering.
- Fox, Margalit (2005-11-20). "Rutherford Aris, 76, Chemical Engineer, Dies". The New York Times.
