= Gilbert Froment =

Belgian chemical engineer (born 1930)

Gilbert F. Froment
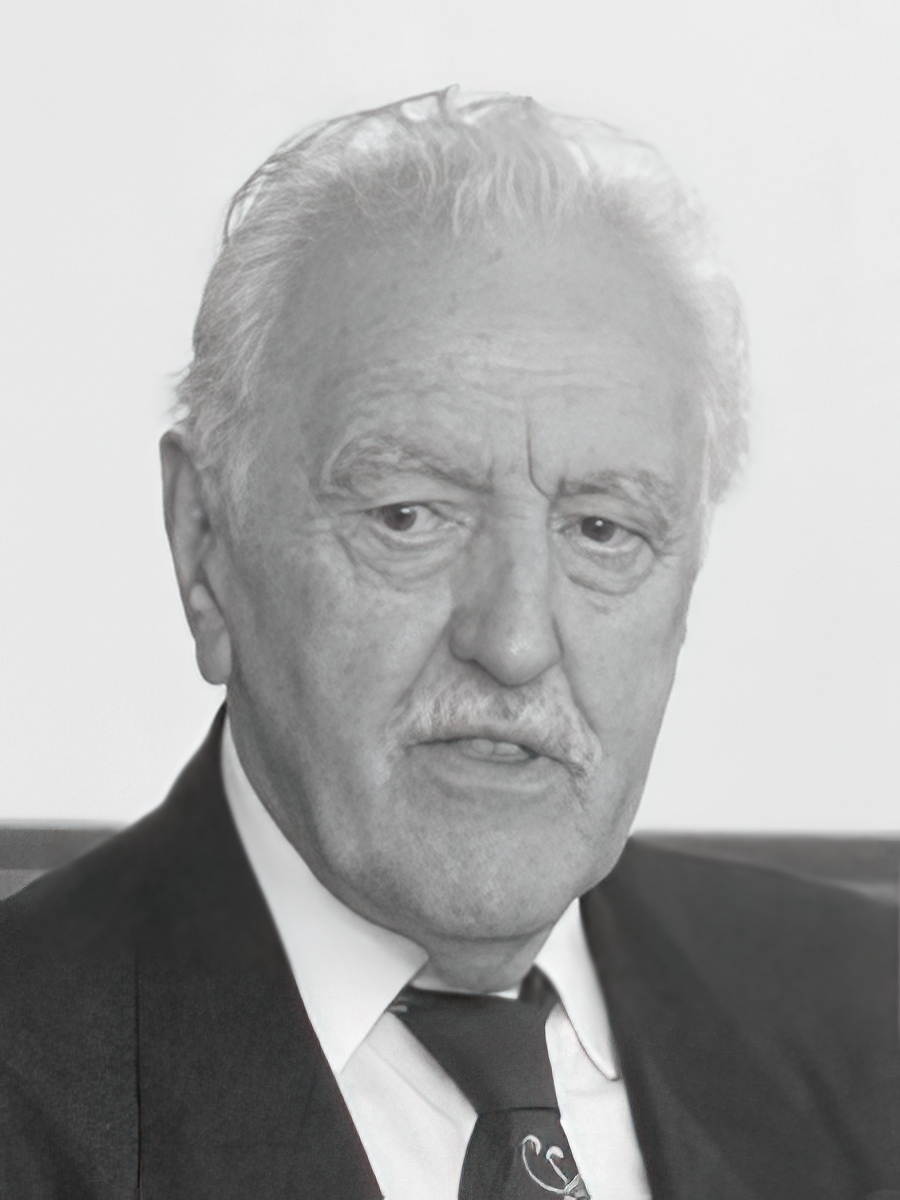
- Born: 1 October 1930 (age 96); Belgium
- Education: Ghent University
- Known for: Applied & industrial reaction kinetics Reactor modeling Catalytic reaction engineering
- Awards: Amundson Award (ISCRE, 2007); Villermaux Medal of the European Federation of Chemical Engineering (1999); Wilhelm Award (AIChE, 1986)
- Scientific career
- Fields: Chemical reaction engineering
- Workplaces: Ghent University; Texas A&M University
- Doctoral advisor: Professor Goethals

Gilbert F. Froment (born 1 October 1930) is a Belgian chemical engineer and academic. He is Professor Emeritus of chemical engineering at Ghent University, Belgium, and a research professor at Texas A&M University. Froment specialises in kinetic and chemical reaction engineering studies and their application in the process industry.

Froment was elected a member of the National Academy of Engineering in 1999 "for the application of fundamental approaches in the analysis of complex, industrially important processes and reactors."

== Education ==
Gilbert Froment received a degree in chemical engineering from Ghent University in 1953, and earned a Ph.D. in the same field in 1957.

Following his graduation, he spent a year with Professor Schoeneman at the Institute for Chemical Technology in Darmstadt, Germany. The following year, he obtained a fellowship from the Belgian American Educational Foundation enabling a year at the University of Wisconsin-Madison, where he worked with Professors Olaf Hougen, K.M. Watson, and C.C. Watson on catalytic kinetics and the modeling of catalyst beds.

=== Tenure at Ghent University ===
In 1959, he returned to Ghent University as an associate professor. In 1968, he became a full professor and director of the Laboratorium voor Petrochemische Techniek. In 1996 he became professor emeritus. Froment's research focused on designing and simulating industrial catalytic reactors using mathematical models.

Froment's research has focused on catalyst particle transport and deactivation since the 1980s. His work has emphasized retaining network topology and connectivity in catalyst particle modeling, particularly in scenarios involving pore obstructions. He has also done extensive work on catalyst deactivation caused by coke formation, using techniques such as Bethe and percolation networks to describe mass transport and reactions within catalyst particles.

Another major area of Froment's research is thermal cracking for olefin production, starting in 1959 with the derivation of accurate kinetic data from experimentation in tubular flow reactors and developing the equivalent reactor volume concept. His continued work in this area has led to advanced reaction kinetics integrated within reactor models with transport phenomena, including heat transfer and three-dimensional computational fluid dynamics calculations.

=== Tenure at Texas A&M ===
Following his retirement from Ghent University, Froment joined Texas A&M University as a research professor. Between 1999 and 2015 he directed 9 Ph.D. students and several postdocs. His research concentrated on the application of the Single Event concept to complex refining processes such as FCC, hydrocracking, alkylation, and petrochemical processes such as methanol-to-olefins (MTO) and oligomerization. Since 2015, he has focused on the kinetics and design of the Fischer–Tropsch process.

== Travel ==
Froment has been a visiting professor at several universities, including KU Leuven (1967–77), Université libre de Bruxelles (1967–69), Yale University (1969), University of Houston (1973 and 1981), Universidad Nacional del Sur (1977), University of Buenos Aires (1981), National University of Salta (since 1983), National University of the Littoral (1983), and Stanford University (1984). He was also an adjunct professor at University of Delaware (1980–85).

=== Textbook: Chemical Reactor Analysis and Design ===
In collaboration with Kenneth Bischoff and Juray De Wilde, Froment published the textbook Chemical Reactor Analysis and Design (1979, 1990, and 2010). The textbook is used internationally in chemical engineering curricula.

== Chemical Reaction Engineering ==
Froment is the founder of the Chemical Engineering Section of the Koninklijke Vlaamse Ingenieursvereniging. He has been a member of the Working Party on Chemical Reaction Engineering of the European Federation of Chemical Engineering since 1966 and of the Working Party of the Use of Computers in Chemical Engineering since 1968. He has organized congresses on "Catalyst Deactivation" and "Large Chemical Plants." He chaired ISCRE-14 in Bruges, Belgium. He was co-editor of Chemical Engineering Science from 1965 until 1996 and of Chemical Reaction Engineering Reviews since 1971. He has served on the editorial boards of several other publications.

== Academic accomplishments ==
Froment has mentored over 70 Ph.D. students and published over 300 scientific publications. He has received numerous awards, including the Frederick Swarts Award for Applied Chemistry (1958), the National Alumni Award of the Belgian University Foundation (1966), the Prix Cornez de la Province du Hainaut (1976), the R. H. Wilhelm Award (1984), a Doctor of Science Honoris Causa degree from Technion (1984), the Villermaux Medal (1999), and the Neal R. Amundson Award (2007). He is a member of the Académie Royale Belge des Sciences d'Outre mer (1981), the Koninklijke Academie van België (1988), and the National Academy of Engineering (1999).

== Key publications ==
- Froment, G.F.; Bischoff, K.B. (December 1961). "Non-steady state behaviour of fixed bed catalytic reactors due to catalyst fouling". Chemical Engineering Science. 16 (3–4): 189–201. Bibcode:1961ChEnS..16..189F. doi:10.1016/0009-2509(61)80030-4.
- De Wasch, A. P.; Froment, G. F. (1972). "Velocity, temperature and conversion profiles in fixed bed catalytic reactors". Chemical Engineering Science. 27 (3): 567–576. Bibcode:1972ChEnS..27..567D. doi:10.1016/0009-2509(72)87012-X.
- Marin, G.B.; Froment, G. F. (1982). "Reforming of C6 hydrocarbons on a Pt/Al2O3 catalyst". Chemical Engineering Science. 37 (5): 759–773. doi:10.1016/0009-2509(82)85037-9.
- Xu, Jianguo; Froment, G. F. (1989). "Methane steam reforming, methanation and water-gas shift: I. Intrinsic kinetics". AIChE Journal. 35 (1): 88–96. Bibcode:1989AIChE..35...88X. doi:10.1002/aic.690350109.
- Marchi, A.J.; Froment, G.F. (1991-04-04). "Catalytic conversion of methanol to light alkenes on SAPO molecular sieves". Applied Catalysis. 71 (1): 139–152. doi:10.1016/0166-9834(91)85011-J.
- Vanden Bussche, G H K M; Froment, G F (1996). "A Steady-State Kinetic Model for Methanol Synthesis and the Water Gas Shift Reaction on a Commercial Cu/ZnO/Al2O3Catalyst". Journal of Catalysis. 161 (1): 1–10. doi:10.1006/jcat.1996.0156.
