= Meurice =

Meurice may refer to:

- François-Désiré Froment-Meurice (1802–1855), French goldsmith
- Jean-Michel Meurice (1938–2022), French cineaste and artist
- Paul Meurice (1818–1905), French novelist and playwright
- Pedro Meurice (1932–2011), Archbishop of the Archdiocese of Santiago de Cuba

== Other ==
- Hôtel Meurice, 5-star hotel in Paris
- Meurice Laboratories, former pharmaceutical division of Union chimique belge
