= Chemical reaction engineering =

Subfield of chemical engineering

Chemical reaction engineering (reaction engineering or reactor engineering) is a specialty in chemical engineering or industrial chemistry dealing with chemical reactors. Frequently the term relates specifically to catalytic reaction systems where either a homogeneous or heterogeneous catalyst is present in the reactor. Sometimes a reactor per se is not present by itself, but rather is integrated into a process, for example in reactive separations vessels, retorts, certain fuel cells, and photocatalytic surfaces. The issue of solvent effects on reaction kinetics is also considered as an integral part.

== Origin of chemical reaction engineering ==
Chemical reaction engineering as a discipline started in the early 1950s under the impulse of researchers at the Shell Amsterdam research center and the University of Delft. The term chemical reaction engineering was apparently coined by J.C. Vlugter while preparing the 1st European Symposium on Chemical Reaction Engineering which was held in Amsterdam in 1957.

== Discipline ==
Chemical reaction engineering aims at studying and optimizing chemical reactions in order to define the best reactor design. Hence, the interactions of flow phenomena, mass transfer, heat transfer, and reaction kinetics are of prime importance in order to relate reactor performance to feed composition and operating conditions. Although originally applied to the petroleum and petrochemical industries, its general methodology combining reaction chemistry and chemical engineering concepts allows optimization of a variety of systems where modeling or engineering of reactions is needed. Chemical reaction engineering approaches are indeed tailored for the development of new processes and the improvement of existing technologies.

== Books ==
- The Engineering of Chemical Reactions (2nd Edition), Lanny Schmidt, 2004, Oxford University Press, ISBN 0195169255
- Chemical Reaction Engineering (3rd Edition), Octave Levenspiel, 1999, John Wiley & Sons, ISBN 9971512416, ISBN 9789971512415
- Elements of Chemical Reaction Engineering (4th Edition), H. Scott Fogler, 2005, Prentice Hall, ISBN 0130473944, ISBN 9780130473943
- Chemical Reactor Analysis and Design (2nd Edition), Gilbert F. Froment and Kenneth B. Bischoff, 1990, John Wiley & Sons, ISBN 0471510440, ISBN 9780471510444
- Fundamentals of Chemical Reaction Engineering (1st Edition), Mark E. Davis and Robert J. Davis, 2003, The McGraw-Hill Companies, Inc., ISBN 007245007X, ISBN 9780072450071

== ISCRE Symposia ==
The most important series of symposia are the International Symposia on Chemical Reaction Engineering or ISCRE conferences. These three-day conferences are held every two years, rotating among sites in North America, Europe, and the Asia-Pacific region, on a six-year cycle. These conferences bring together for three days distinguished international researchers in reaction engineering, prominent industrial practitioners, and new researchers and students of this multifaceted field. ISCRE symposia are a unique gathering place for reaction engineers where research gains are consolidated and new frontiers explored. The state of the art of various sub-disciplines of reaction engineering is reviewed in a timely manner, and new research initiatives are discussed.

== Awards in Chemical Reaction Engineering ==
The ISCRE Board administers two premiere awards in chemical reaction engineering for senior and junior researchers every three years.

=== Neal R. Amundson Award for Excellence in Chemical Reaction Engineering ===
In 1996, the ISCRE Board of Directors established the Neal R. Amundson Award for Excellence in Chemical Reaction Engineering. This award recognizes a pioneer in the field of Chemical Reaction Engineering who has exerted a major influence on the theory or practice of the field, through originality, creativity, and novelty of concept or application. The award is made every three years at an ISCRE meeting, and consists of a Plaque and a check in the amount of $5000. The Amundson Award is generously supported by a grant from the ExxonMobil Corporation. Winners of the award include:

- 1996: Neal Amundson, Professor - University of Minnesota, University of Houston
- 1999: Rutherford Aris, Professor - University of Minnesota
- 2001: Octave Levenspiel, Professor - Oregon State University
- 2004: Vern Weekman, Mobil
- 2007: Gilbert Froment, Professor - Ghent University, Texas A&M University
- 2010: Dan Luss, Professor - University of Houston
- 2013: Lanny Schmidt, Professor - University of Minnesota
- 2016: Milorad P. Dudukovic, Professor - Washington University
- 2019: W. Harmon Ray, Professor - University of Wisconsin
- 2023: Klavs F. Jensen, Professor - Massachusetts Institute of Technology

=== Rutherford Aris Young Investigator Award in Chemical Reaction Engineering ===
In 2016, the ISCRE, Inc. Board of Directors will bestow the first Rutherford Aris Young Investigator Award for Excellence in Chemical Reaction Engineering. This award will recognize outstanding contributions in experimental and/or theoretical reaction engineering research of investigators in early stages of their career. The recipient must be less than 40 years of age at the end of the calendar year in which the award is presented. The Aris Award is generously supported by a grant from the UOP, L.L.C., a Honeywell Company. The award consists of a plaque, an honorarium of $3000, and up to $2000 in travel funds to present at an ISCRE/NASCRE conference and to present a lecture at UOP. This award complements ISCRE's other major honor, the Neal R. Amundson Award. Winners of the award include:

- 2016: Paul J. Dauenhauer, Professor - University of Minnesota
- 2019: Yuriy Roman-Leschkov, Professor - Massachusetts Institute of Technology
- 2023: Rajamani Gounder, Professor - Purdue University

== See also ==
- Molecular design software
