= Administrator of NASA =

Head of the US independent space agency

Administrator of the National Aeronautics and Space Administration
- Seal of the National Aeronautics and Space Administration

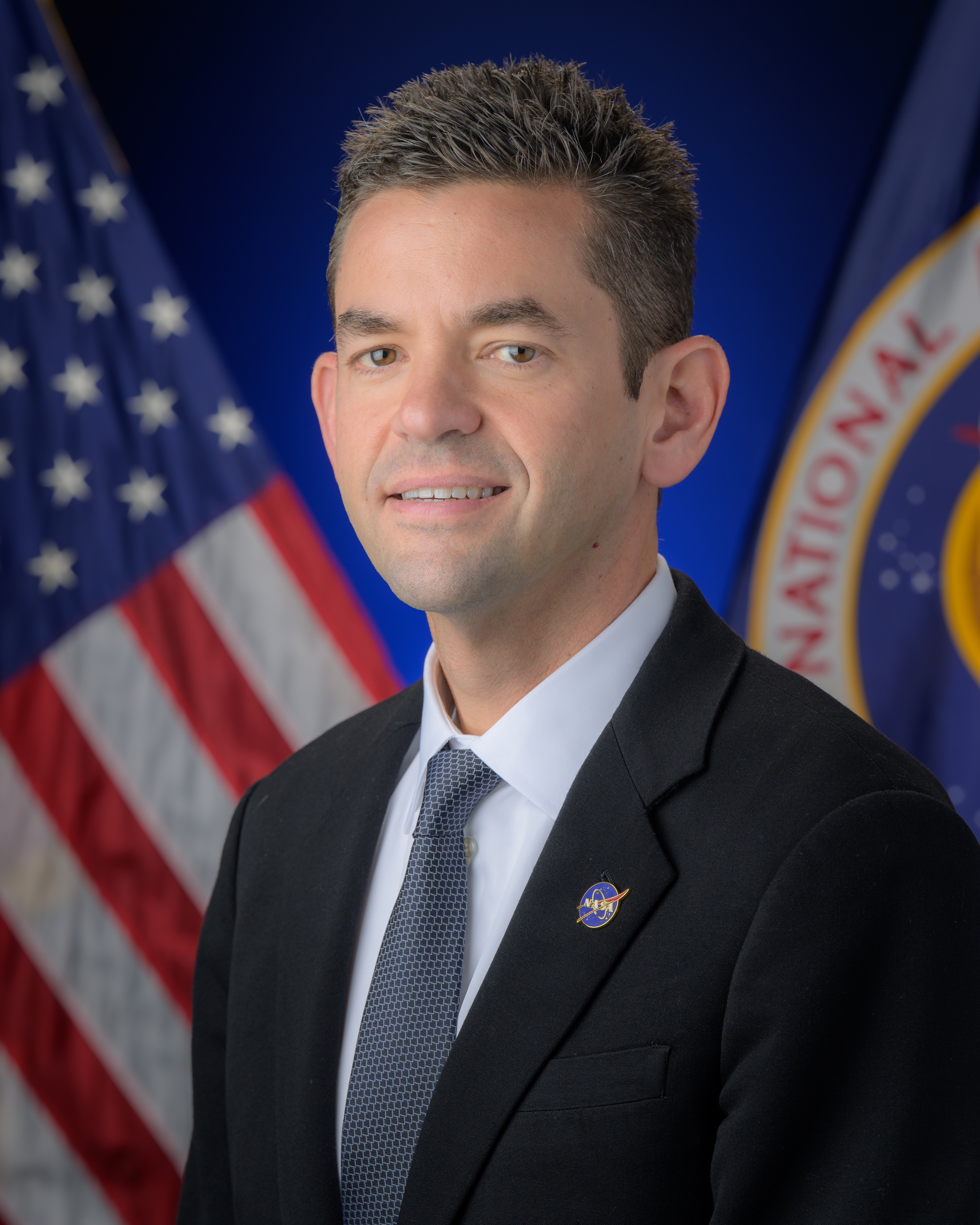
- Incumbent; Jared Isaacman since December 18, 2025
- National Aeronautics and Space Administration
- Reports to: President of the United States
- Seat: Mary W. Jackson NASA Headquarters, Washington, D.C.
- Appointer: The president with advice and consent of the Senate
- Term length: No fixed term
- Constituting instrument: 51 U.S.C. § 20111
- Formation: August 19, 1958; 68 years ago
- First holder: T. Keith Glennan
- Deputy: Deputy Administrator
- Salary: Executive Schedule, Level II
- Website: nasa.gov

The administrator of the National Aeronautics and Space Administration is the highest-ranking official of NASA, the national space agency of the United States. The administrator is NASA's chief decision maker, responsible for providing clarity to the agency's vision and serving as a source of internal leadership within NASA. The office holder also has an important place within United States space policy, and is assisted by a deputy administrator.

The administrator is appointed by the president of the United States, with the advice and consent of the United States Senate, and thereafter serves at the president's pleasure. Jared Isaacman has served as the administrator since December 18, 2025.

== Duties and responsibilities ==
The administrator serves as NASA's chief executive officer, accountable to the president for the leadership necessary to achieve the agency's mission. This leadership requires articulating the agency's vision, setting its programmatic and budget priorities and internal policies, and assessing agency performance.

== History ==
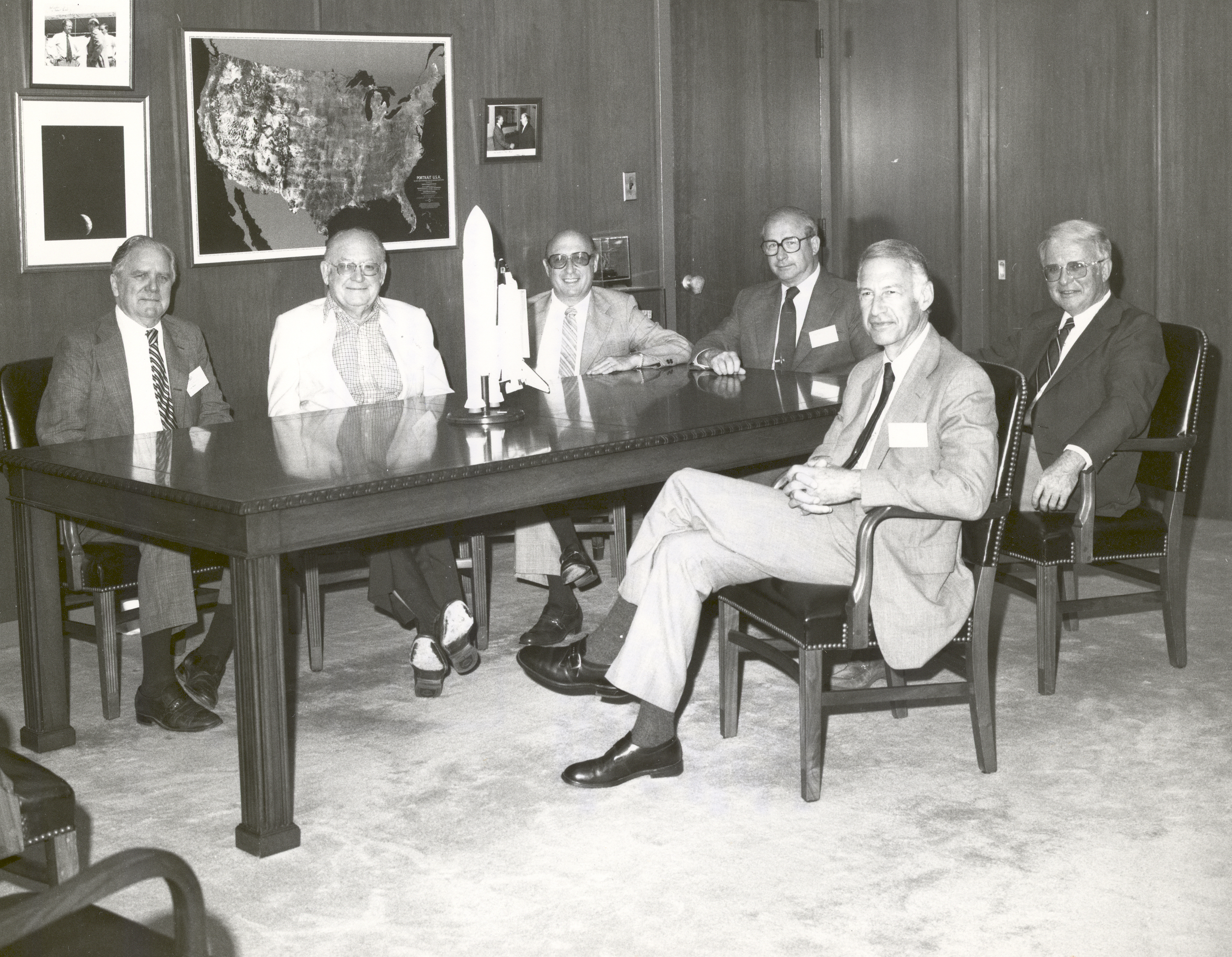
Six former NASA administrators in 1980: (from left) James E. Webb, T. Keith Glennan, Robert A Frosch, Thomas O. Paine, George M. Low, and Alan M. Lovelace

The first administrator of NASA was Dr. T. Keith Glennan; during his term he brought together the disparate projects in space development research in the US. Glennan presided over an organization that had absorbed the earlier National Advisory Committee for Aeronautics (NACA) intact; its 8,000 employees, an annual budget of $100 million, and three major research laboratories—Langley Aeronautical Laboratory, Ames Aeronautical Laboratory, and Lewis Flight Propulsion Laboratory—and two small test facilities made up the core of the new NASA. Within a short time after NASA's formal organization, Glennan incorporated several organizations involved in space exploration projects from other federal agencies into NASA. He brought in part of the Naval Research Laboratory and created the Goddard Space Flight Center. He also incorporated several disparate satellite programs, two lunar probes, and the research effort to develop a million pound force (4.4 MN) thrust, single-chamber rocket engine from the U.S. Air Force and the U.S. Department of Defense's (DOD) Advanced Research Projects Agency. In December 1958 Glennan also acquired control of the Jet Propulsion Laboratory, a contractor facility operated by the California Institute of Technology. In 1960, Glennan obtained the transfer to NASA of the Army Ballistic Missile Agency, located at Huntsville, Alabama, and renamed it the Marshall Space Flight Center.

The second administrator, James E. Webb, served from 1961 to 1968, from the beginning of the Kennedy administration through the end of the Johnson administration, thus overseeing each of the critical first crewed missions throughout the Mercury and Gemini programs until days before the launch of the first Apollo mission. He also dealt with the Apollo 1 fire. During Webb's administration, NASA developed from a loose collection of research centers to a coordinated organization. He had a key role in creating the Manned Spacecraft Center, later the Johnson Space Center, in Houston. Despite the pressures to focus on the Apollo program, Webb ensured that NASA carried out a program of planetary exploration with the Mariner and Pioneer space programs. Webb was an early champion of space telescopes, like the one that would later bear his name. Encouraged by Kennedy and Johnson, Webb made racial integration a priority for the agency. NASA publicly supported the Civil Rights Act of 1964 and initiated a series of innovative programs aimed at increasing black participation including specifically targeting black colleges and schools with recruitment programs.

The only person to hold the post twice is James C. Fletcher. During his first administration at NASA, Fletcher was responsible for beginning the Space Shuttle effort, as well as the Viking program that sent landers to Mars. He oversaw the Skylab missions and approved the Voyager space probes and the Apollo–Soyuz Test Project. He returned to NASA following the Challenger disaster.

Daniel Goldin held the post for the longest term (nearly 10 years), and is best known for pioneering the "faster, better, cheaper" approach to space programs.

The current administrator is entrepreneur and philanthropist Jared Isaacman, who was nominated by President Donald Trump on November 5, 2025. He replaced Sean Duffy, who served as acting administrator from July 9, 2025 to December 17, 2025. Jared Isaacman was nominated by Trump (while he was president-elect) on December 4, 2024, but his nomination was withdrawn on May 31, reportedly because of his connections to Elon Musk and donations towards Democratic, anti-Trump politicians.

== List of administrators ==
Status

Denotes an acting administrator of NASA

No.	Portrait	Name	Took office	Left office	Days served	President serving under
1	T. Keith Glennan	T. Keith Glennan	August 19, 1958	January 20, 1961	885	Dwight D. Eisenhower
-	Hugh Dryden	Hugh Dryden	January 11, 1961	February 14, 1961	24	John F. Kennedy
2	James E. Webb	James E. Webb	February 14, 1961	October 7, 1968	1,035	John F. Kennedy
2	James E. Webb	James E. Webb	February 14, 1961	October 7, 1968	1,781 (2,816 total)	Lyndon B. Johnson
3	Thomas O. Paine	Thomas O. Paine	October 8, 1968	March 21, 1969	104	Lyndon B. Johnson
3	Thomas O. Paine	Thomas O. Paine	October 8, 1968	March 21, 1969	60	Richard Nixon
3	Thomas O. Paine	Thomas O. Paine	March 21, 1969	September 15, 1970	543 (707 total)	Richard Nixon
-	George Low	George Low	September 16, 1970	April 26, 1971	222	Richard Nixon
4	James C. Fletcher	James C. Fletcher	April 27, 1971	May 1, 1977	1,200	Richard Nixon
4	James C. Fletcher	James C. Fletcher	April 27, 1971	May 1, 1977	895	Gerald Ford
4	James C. Fletcher	James C. Fletcher	April 27, 1971	May 1, 1977	101 (3,258 total)	Jimmy Carter
-	Alan M. Lovelace	Alan M. Lovelace	May 2, 1977	June 20, 1977	49	Jimmy Carter
5	Robert A. Frosch	Robert A. Frosch	June 21, 1977	January 20, 1981	1,309	Jimmy Carter
-	Alan M. Lovelace	Alan M. Lovelace	January 21, 1981	July 10, 1981	171 (220 total)	Ronald Reagan
6	James M. Beggs	James M. Beggs	July 10, 1981	December 4, 1985	1,608	Ronald Reagan
-	William Graham	William Graham	December 4, 1985	May 11, 1986	158	Ronald Reagan
7	James C. Fletcher	James C. Fletcher	May 12, 1986	April 8, 1989	984	Ronald Reagan
7	James C. Fletcher	James C. Fletcher	May 12, 1986	April 8, 1989	78 (3258 total)	George H. W. Bush
-	Dale D. Myers	Dale D. Myers	April 8, 1989	May 13, 1989	35	George H. W. Bush
8	Richard H. Truly	Richard H. Truly	May 14, 1989	June 30, 1989	47	George H. W. Bush
8	Richard H. Truly	Richard H. Truly	July 1, 1989	March 31, 1992	1,004 (1,052 total)	George H. W. Bush
9	Daniel Goldin	Daniel Goldin	April 1, 1992	November 17, 2001	294	George H. W. Bush
9	Daniel Goldin	Daniel Goldin	April 1, 1992	November 17, 2001	2,922	Bill Clinton
9	Daniel Goldin	Daniel Goldin	April 1, 1992	November 17, 2001	301 (3,517 total)	George W. Bush
-	Daniel Mulville	Daniel Mulville	November 19, 2001	December 21, 2001	32	George W. Bush
10	Sean O'Keefe	Sean O'Keefe	December 21, 2001	February 11, 2005	1,148	George W. Bush
-	Frederick D. Gregory	Frederick D. Gregory	February 11, 2005	April 14, 2005	62	George W. Bush
11	Michael D. Griffin	Michael D. Griffin	April 14, 2005	January 20, 2009	1,377	George W. Bush
-	Christopher Scolese	Christopher Scolese	January 20, 2009	July 17, 2009	178	Barack Obama
12	Charles Bolden	Charles Bolden	July 17, 2009	January 20, 2017	2,744	Barack Obama
-	Robert Lightfoot	Robert M. Lightfoot Jr.	January 20, 2017	April 23, 2018	458	Donald Trump
13	Jim Bridenstine	Jim Bridenstine	April 23, 2018	January 20, 2021	1,003	Donald Trump
-	Steve Jurczyk	Steve Jurczyk	January 20, 2021	May 3, 2021	103	Joe Biden
14	Bill Nelson	Bill Nelson	May 3, 2021	January 20, 2025	1,358	Joe Biden
-	Janet Petro	Janet Petro	January 20, 2025	July 9, 2025	170	Donald Trump
-	Sean Duffy	Sean Duffy	July 9, 2025	December 18, 2025	162	Donald Trump
15	Jared Isaacman official portrait, photographed by Bill Ingalls	Jared Isaacman	December 18, 2025	Incumbent	262	Donald Trump

== Line of succession ==
The line of succession for the administrator of the National Aeronautics and Space Administration is as follows:

1. Deputy Administrator of NASA
2. Associate administrator of NASA
3. Chief of staff of NASA
4. Director of Johnson Space Center (Houston, Texas)
5. Director of Kennedy Space Center (Merritt Island, Florida)
6. Director of Marshall Space Flight Center (Redstone Arsenal, Alabama)

In the event of there being no deputy administrator of NASA, the associate administrator will serve as acting administrator.

== See also ==
- Chairmen of the National Advisory Committee for Aeronautics
- NASA Chief Scientist
- Similar positions worldwide
  - Canada: President of the Canadian Space Agency
  - Europe: Director General of the European Space Agency
  - India: Chairman of ISRO
  - Russia: General Director of Roscosmos
