= Robert A. Frosch =

American scientist (1928–2020)

Robert Alan Frosch FREng
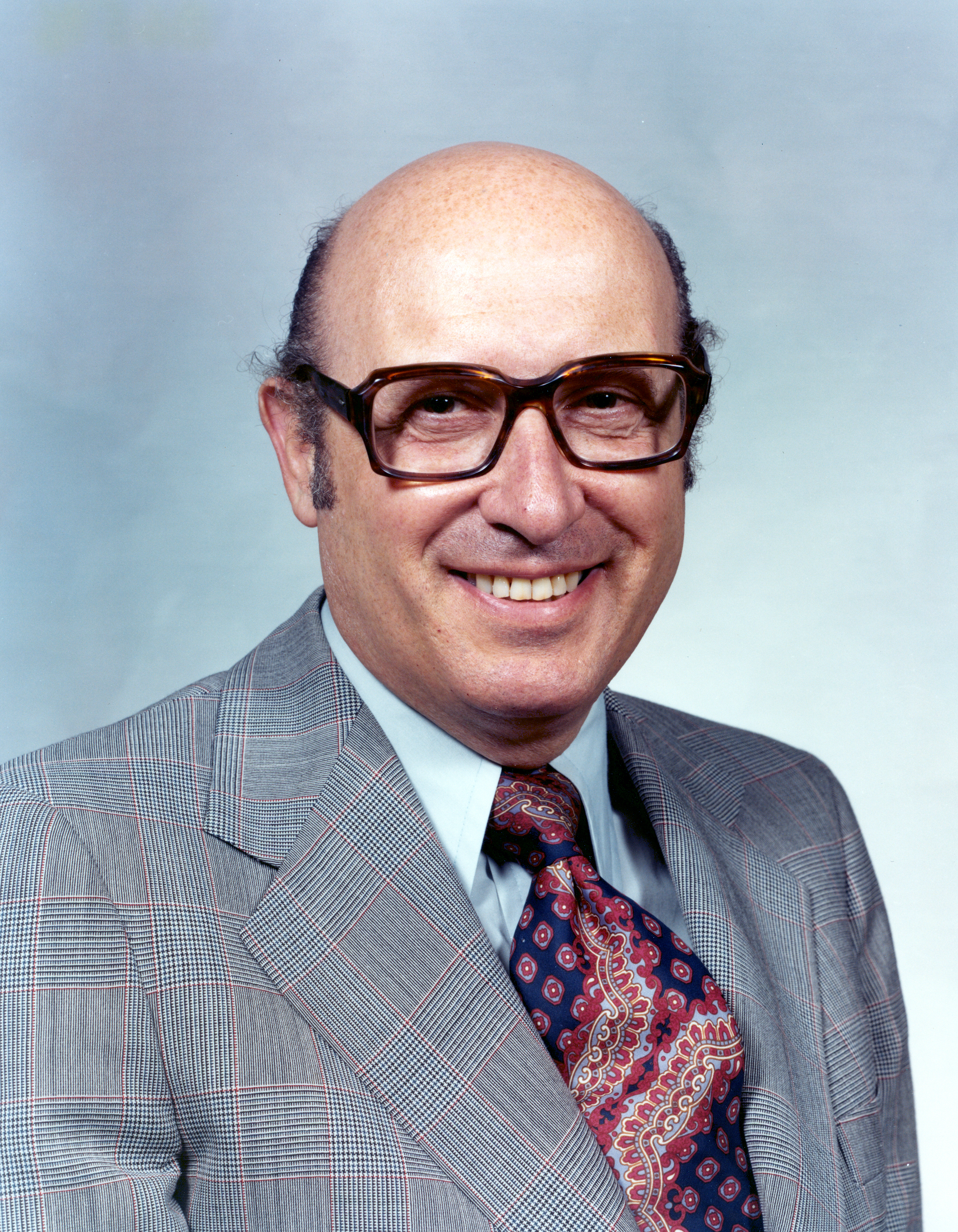

5th Administrator of the National Aeronautics and Space Administration
- In office June 21, 1977 – January 20, 1981
- President: Jimmy Carter
- Preceded by: James C. Fletcher
- Succeeded by: James M. Beggs

Personal details
- Born: May 22, 1928 New York City
- Died: December 30, 2020 (aged 92) South Hadley, Massachusetts, U.S.
- Scientific career
- Education: Columbia University (BS. MA, PhD)
- Awards: ASME Thurston Lecture Award (1984); FREng (1989); IRI Medal (1996); IEEE Founders Medal (2001)
- Fields: Theoretical Physics
- Workplaces: ARPA; United Nations Environmental Program; NASA
- Thesis: Magnetic hyperfine structure in diatomic molecules (1952)

Robert Alan Frosch (May 22, 1928 – December 30, 2020) was an American scientist who was the fifth administrator of NASA. He was the administrator from 1977 to 1981 during the Carter administration.

== Biography ==
Born in New York City, Frosch was educated in the public school system in The Bronx. He earned undergraduate and graduate degrees in theoretical physics at Columbia University.

Between September 1951 and August 1963, Frosch worked as a research scientist and director of research programs for Hudson Laboratories of Columbia University in Dobbs Ferry, New York, an organization under contract to the Office of Naval Research. Until 1953, he worked on problems in underwater sound, sonar, oceanography, marine geology, and marine geophysics. Frosch was first associate and then director of the laboratories, where he managed 300 employees, two ocean-going research vessels, and a $3.5 million annual budget for fundamental research and engineering. During this period he was also technical director of Project Artemis, a very large experimental active sonar system development.

In September 1963, Frosch went to Washington, D.C., to work with the Advanced Research Projects Agency (ARPA) in the U.S. Department of Defense, serving as director for nuclear test detection (Project VELA), and then as deputy director of the Advanced Research Projects Agency, sharing responsibility for managing a $270 million per year program of research and development. In July 1966 he became Assistant Secretary of the Navy for Research and Development, responsible for all Navy programs of research, development, engineering, test and evaluation averaging $2.5 billion annually. From January 1973 to July 1975, Frosch served as assistant executive director of the United Nations Environmental Program. With the rank of assistant secretary general of the United Nations, he was responsible for substantive global program activities of the United Nations system and other international activities related to environment matters.

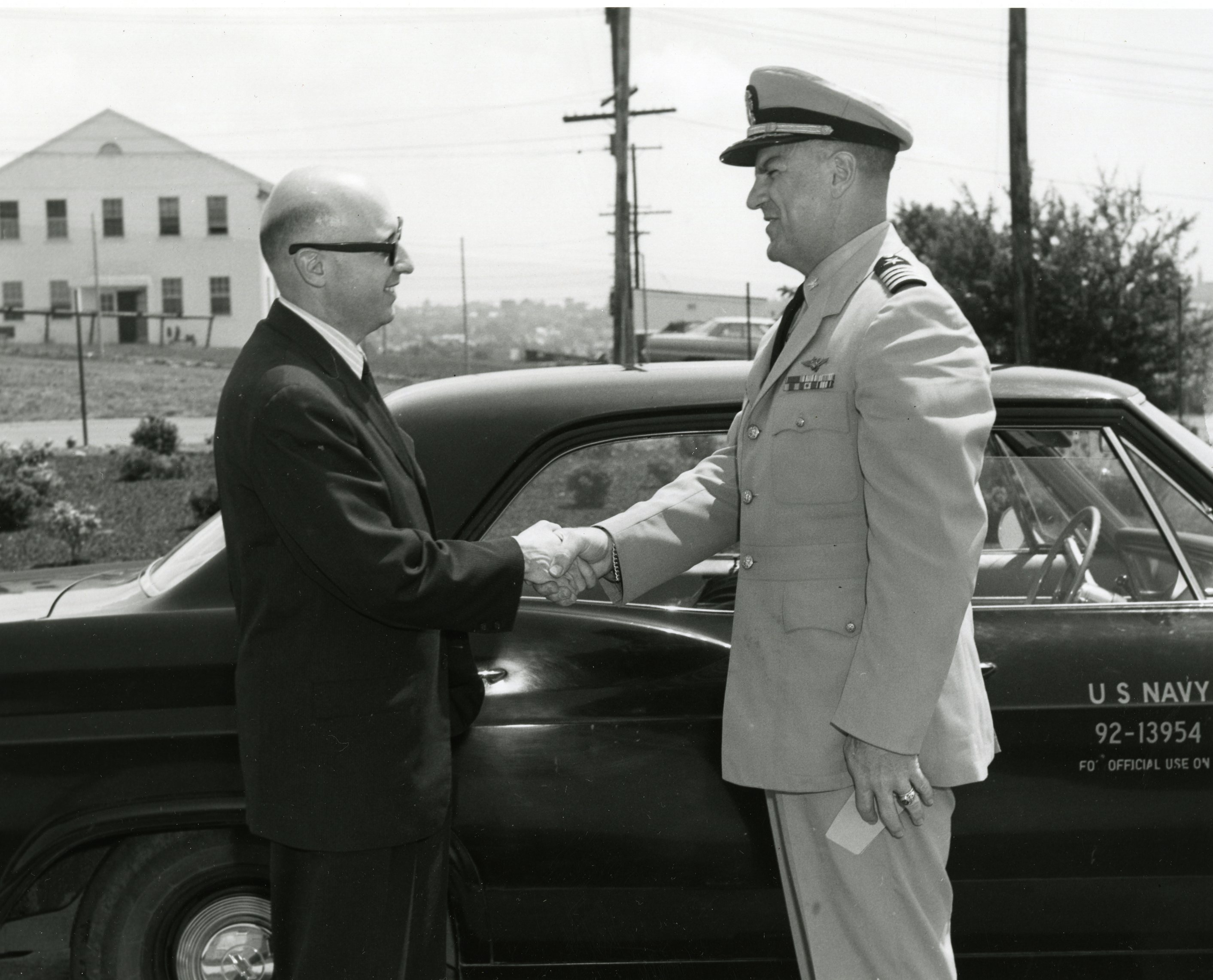
Assistant Secretary of the Navy for Research and Development meets the Commanding Officer of Naval Undersea Warfare Station.

While at NASA, Frosch was responsible for overseeing the continuation of the development effort on the Space Shuttle program. During his tenure, the project underwent testing of the first orbiter, Enterprise, at NASA's Dryden Flight Research Center in southern California.

He received the Robert Henry Thurston Lecture Award from the American Society of Mechanical Engineers in 1984, and was appointed an International Fellow of the Royal Academy of Engineering in 1989.

Frosch left NASA with the change of administrations in January 1981 to become vice president for research at the General Motors Research Laboratories. In 1985, he was the recipient of the Maurice Holland Award from the Industrial Research Institute for a paper published in IRI's journal, Research Management. In 1996, his leadership at GM was recognized once more by IRI with the presentation of their official Medal. After retiring, he remained active in scientific and technical policy activities; as a senior research fellow at the Kennedy School of Government, Harvard University, and a guest investigator at Woods Hole Oceanographic Institution.

Frosch died in South Hadley, Massachusetts, on December 30, 2020, at the age of 92, after a long illness.

Government offices
Preceded by James C. Fletcher	NASA Administrator; 1977–1981	Succeeded by James M. Beggs
