= Richard N. Foster =

American businessman

- Born: June 10, 1941 (age 85)
- Education: Yale University
- Occupation: Managing Partner of Millbrook Management Group
- Children: 2

Richard N. Foster, Managing Partner, Millbrook Management Group LLC – Foster is a former Director and Senior Partner with McKinsey & Company where he was responsible for serving clients in the U.S., Europe and Asia focusing on industry sectors including chemicals, electronics, healthcare, retail and consumer goods industries.

== Early life and education ==
Foster received his B.S., M.S. and PhD in Engineering and Applied Science from Yale University.

== Career ==
During his 31-year tenure with McKinsey & Company and beginning in 1973, Foster was elected principal (1977) and later Senior Partner and Director (1982), a position he maintained for 22 years. Before leaving McKinsey & Company, Foster served as founder and Managing Director of McKinsey's private equity practice. He also founded and led McKinsey's technology and healthcare sectors. In addition, Foster led the multi-decade consulting activities with one of McKinsey's largest clients, a healthcare company.

While at McKinsey & Company, Foster led a fifteen-year effort to construct and analyze a database to analyze the financial and capital markets records of over 4000 U.S. companies. This effort resulted in Foster's two best selling books, “Innovation: The Attacker’s Advantage” (1986) and “Creative Destruction” (2000), which focuses on the relationship between capital formation, innovation and corporate leadership. In 1985, Foster co-authored two articles which appeared in the journal Research Management of the Industrial Research Institute (IRI) titled "Improving the Return on R&D --- I" and "--- II" which received recognition in 1986 by IRI with the presentation of the Maurice Holland Award to its authors.

Foster served as a member of the Board of the Santa Fe Institute from 1994-2004, where he was the primary sponsor of the economics program focusing on finance and trading strategies.

Foster is a director of Trust Company of the West, athenahealth, the Council for Aid to Education where he is chairman of the strategy committee, Cardax Pharmaceuticals, the Memorial Sloan Kettering Institute where he is chairman of the operations and policy committee, the W.M. Keck Foundation, Innosight and the Council on Foreign Relations.

In April 2011, Foster joined Lux Capital as a venture partner, providing expertise in life sciences and healthcare IT investment.

== Personal life ==
Foster lives in New York, NY.

== Bibliography ==
- Richard N. Foster and Sarah Kaplan. "Creative Destruction: Why Companies that are Built to Last Underperform the Market - And how to Successfully Transform Them". Currency publisher. 2000.
- Richard N. Foster "Innovation: The Attacker's Advantage". Summit Books. 1986.
