= ESCM =

ESCM may refer to:

- ESCM (album), a 1997 album by BT
- eSourcing Capability Model, a framework developed to improve the relationship between IT services providers and their customers
- ESCM, the ICAO code of Ärna Airport
- The European Society For Composite Materials (ESCM), the patron of the European Conference on Composite Materials
