= ICCM =

ICCM or iCCM may refer to:

- Integrated Community Case Management – agenda of the World Health Organization
- International Centre for Contemporary Music
- International Conference on Cognitive Modelling
- International Conference on Composite Materials
- International Congress of Chinese Mathematicians
