= Uma Chowdhry =

American chemist

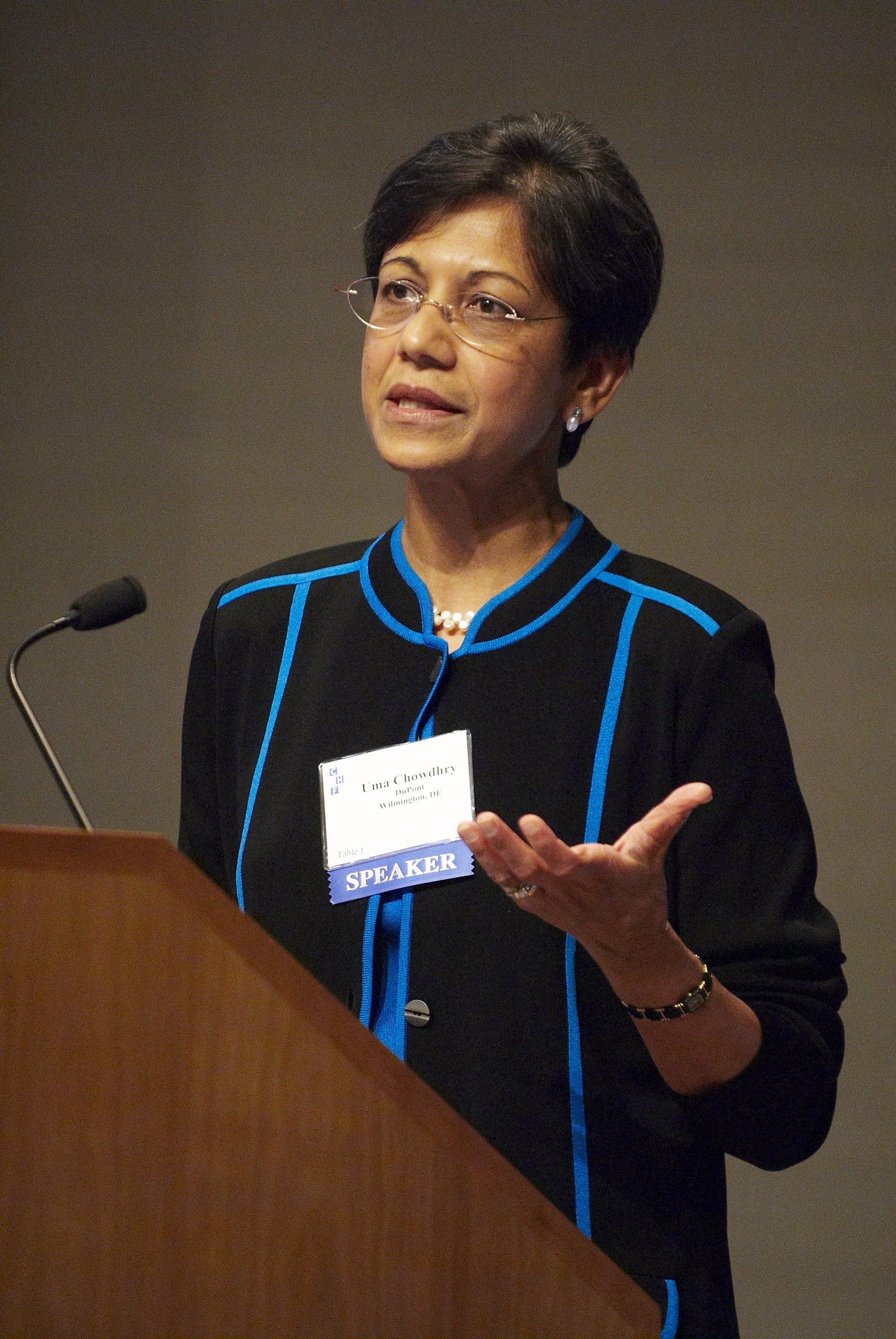
- Born: 1947 (age 78–79); Mumbai, India
- Died: January 7, 2024
- Education: Mumbai University, Caltech, MIT
- Awards: IRI Medal (2011)
- Scientific career
- Fields: Materials science
- Workplaces: Ford Motor Company, DuPont

External videos
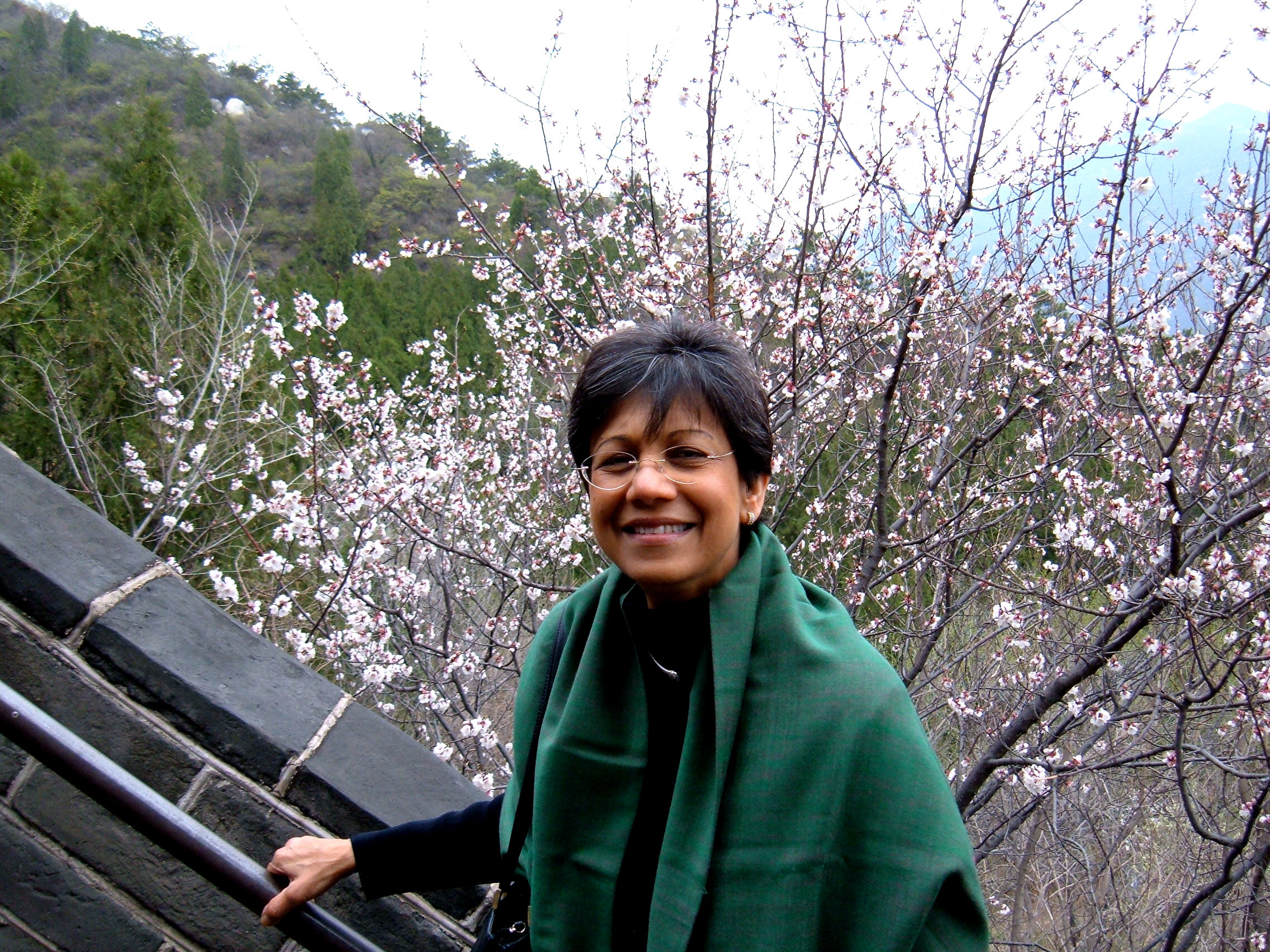
- Uma Chowdhry in 2008
- "I had the courage to dream the impossible", Uma Chowdhry, Science History Institute (14:21)

Uma Chowdhry (1947 – January 7, 2024) was an American chemist whose career was spent in research and management positions with E. I. du Pont de Nemours and Company. She specialized in the science of ceramic materials, including catalysts, proton conductors, superconductors and ceramic packaging for microelectronics.

== Early life and education ==
Chowdhry was born in Mumbai, India, in 1947. She received a bachelor's degree in physics from the University of Bombay (now Mumbai University) in 1968 before coming to the United States. She received a Master of Science degree from the California Institute of Technology (Caltech) in engineering science in 1970. After two years with Ford Motor Company, she entered the Massachusetts Institute of Technology (MIT) where she earned a Ph.D. in materials science in 1976.

== Career ==
=== DuPont ===
She joined DuPont in 1977 as a research scientist in Central Research & Development Department of E. I. du Pont de Nemours and Company at the DuPont Experimental Station in Wilmington, Delaware. By 1985 she had been promoted to research manager of Central Research. In 1987 she led DuPont's research effort in ceramic superconducting materials and developed a program that generated over 20 patents and 50 publications. In 1988 she became laboratory director of the Electronics group, and by 1991 was promoted to be its director.

The following year she was appointed laboratory director of the Jackson Laboratory for the Specialty Chemicals group. In 1993 she became R&D director, Specialty Chemicals. in 1995 she became business director for terathane products, and two years later was promoted to Business Planning and Technology Director for Chemicals. In 1999 she was promoted to director of DuPont Engineering Technology.

In 2006 she became senior vice president and global chief science and technology officer of DuPont, responsible for the company's core research programs and the DuPont "APEX" portfolio of research programs, including basic chemistry, materials science and biotechnology. She retired in September 2010, becoming chief science and technology officer emeritus.

In response to contamination of Ohio river caused by perfluorooctanoic acid (PFOA, also known as C8), the key ingredient in Teflon, and subsequent cases of cancer and other medical issues, when asked if this C8 chemical could be responsible for babies born with deformities in 2 out of 8 former DuPont women employees, Ms. Uma responded "In the realm of scientific facts, this is not considered a statistically significant sample."

=== Other contributions ===
Chowdhry served on study groups for the National Research Council to assess various technology topics of national interest, and was a member of National Research Council's Committee on Globalization (2004). Chowdhry was a member of the National Committee on Women in Science and Engineering sponsored by both the National Academy of Sciences and the National Academy of Engineering since 1999.

She served on the board of directors for the Industrial Research Institute (2002-2005), Baxter International Inc. (2012-), LORD Corporation (2010-), the Advisory Board for Advanced Technology at the National Institute of Standards (NIST, 2010), the National Inventors Hall of Fame and the Laboratory Operations Board for the Department of Energy for the US Government. She was appointed to the Laboratory Operations Board for the U.S. Department of Energy, Washington, D.C., in 2002.

Chowdhry served on advisory boards of engineering schools at MIT, University of Pennsylvania, Princeton University and the University of Delaware.

Uma Chowdhry and her husband, Vinay Chowdhry, lived in Wilmington, Delaware. She was elected to the board of trustees for Christiana Care Health Services in Delaware in 2003.

Chowdhry died on January 7, 2024, after a long illness preceded by a stroke.

== Awards and honors ==
For her contributions to the science of ceramics, Chowdhry was elected Fellow of the American Ceramic Society in 1989, where she chaired the academy's emerging technologies committee, 2002–2004.

She was elected a member to the National Academy of Engineering in 1996 for the application of advanced ceramic technologies to novel catalyst structures, large-scale chemical synthesis, and multilayer electronic circuit manufacture. Besides her membership, she served on the program advisory board and election subcommittees. She was also elected to the American Academy of Arts and Sciences in 2003.

Chowdhry received the 2011 IRI Medal for her leadership contributions at DuPont. Chowdhry received the 2011 Earle B. Barnes Award for Leadership in Chemical Research Management from the American Chemical Society.
