= Ror (disambiguation) =

The Ror is a caste found mainly in northern India.

Ror, ROR or RoR may also refer to:

== People ==
- Dalel Singh Ror, Indian volleyball player
- Ror Wolf (born 1932), German writer and artist

== Places ==
- ROR, the IATA code for Palau International Airport
- Ror River, tributary of the Târnava Mică River in Romania

== Business ==
- Rate of return, profit on an investment over a period of time
- Ripoff Report, a consumer advocacy website

== Organizations ==
- Reach Out and Read, an American non-profit organization
- Reaching Out Romania, a Romanian non-governmental charitable organization
- Regiment Oranjerivier, an armoured regiment of the South African Army
- Research-on-Research Committee, a nonprofit association
- Research Organization Registry (ROR.org), a database of research organizations
- Retraining of Racehorses, an animal welfare organization in the United Kingdom
- Rhythms of Resistance, a network of political percussion bands

== Science and technology ==
=== Biology and chemistry ===
- R-O-R, general formula for ethers, a class of organic compounds
- ROR, abbreviation for RAR-related orphan receptor, a family of nuclear receptors in molecular biology
- ROR, abbreviation for receptor tyrosine kinase-like orphan receptors, a family of cell surface receptors
- ROR, abbreviation for risk of recurrence

=== Computing ===
- Resources of a Resource, an XML format for describing common website objects to search engines
- Rigs of Rods, a multi-simulation game which uses soft-body physics
- ROtate Right, a common circular shift instruction in assembly language
- Ruby on Rails, a server side web application framework

== Other uses ==
- Review of Religions, a comparative religious magazine in print since 1902
- Rochester railway station, Victoria, Australia
- RoR, common police shorthand for Released on own Recognizance
- RoR, common abbreviation for manga series Record of Ragnarok
- RoR, common abbreviation for The Lord of the Rings Online: Riders of Rohan
- Rule of Rose, a 2006 Japanese video game
- Run-of-the-river hydroelectricity
- Risk of Rain, a 2013 video game
