= IRI Medal =

Award for advances in technology

The IRI Medal, established by the Industrial Research Institute (IRI) in 1946, recognizes and honors leaders of technology for their outstanding accomplishments in technological innovation which contribute broadly to the development of industry and to the benefit of society. One side of the medal depicts a scientist peering into a microscope as a symbol of the never-ending quest for innovation; a pegasus running in the background as a symbol of imagination; and clouds issuing from a retort revealing the practical results of humanity's ability to harness natural forces to meet its needs. The reverse side of the medal is an adaptation of the official seal of the Institute. This award is traditionally presented each spring at the IRI Annual Meeting alongside the IRI Achievement Award.

Picture of IRI Medal, side 1.

Picture of IRI Medal, side 2.

== List of recipients ==
- 1946: Willis R. Whitney (General Electric)
- 1947: Charles A. Thomas (Monsanto)
- 1948: Games Slayter (Owens Corning)
- 1949: Vannevar Bush (Office of Scientific R&D)
- 1950: Frank B. Jewett (Bell Labs)
- 1951: Randolph T. Major (Merck)
- 1952: Roy C. Newton (Swift & Company)
- 1953: Eger V. Murphree (Standard Oil of N.J.)
- 1954: Mervin J. Kelly (Bell Labs)
- 1955: Ernest H. Volwiler (Abbott Laboratories)
- 1956: Victor Conquest (Armour)
- 1957: Clifford F. Rassweiler (Johns Manville)
- 1958: Elmer W. Engstrom (RCA)
- 1959: Frank K. Schoenfeld (BFGoodrich)
- 1960: Augustus B. Kinzel (Union Carbide)
- 1961: Max Tishler (Merck)
- 1962: Chauncey G. Suits (General Electric)
- 1963: James B. Fisk (Bell Labs)
- 1964: Ray H. Boundy (Dow Chemical)
- 1965: Edwin H. Land (Polaroid)
- 1966: Paul L. Salzberg (DuPont Central Research)
- 1967: Emanuel R. Piore (IBM)
- 1968: John H. Dessauer (Xerox)
- 1969: Patrick E. Haggerty (Texas Instruments)
- 1970: William O. Baker (Bell Labs)
- 1971: Henri G. Busignies (International Telephone & Telegraph)
- 1972: Peter C. Goldmark (Goldmark Communications)
- 1973: William E. Shoupp (Westinghouse)
- 1974: Robert W. Cairns (Hercules)
- 1975: James Hillier (RCA)
- 1976: Hendrik B. G. Casimir (N.V. Philips)
- 1977: John J. Burns (Hoffman-La Roche)
- 1978: Malcolm E. Pruitt (Dow Chemical)
- 1979: Arthur M. Bueche (General Electric)
- 1980: Lewis H. Sarett (Merck)
- 1981: William H. Armistead (Corning)
- 1982: N. Bruce Hannay (Bell Labs)
- 1983: Edward E. David Jr. (Exxon R&E)
- 1984: Harry W. Coover (Eastman Chemical)
- 1985: Ralph E. Gomory (IBM)
- 1986: George E. Pake (Xerox)
- 1987: Ian M. Ross (Bell Labs)
- 1988: Abraham B. Cohen (DuPont)
- 1989: Roland W. Schmitt (General Electric)
- 1990: Edward Scolnick (Merck)
- 1991: Mary L. Good (AlliedSignal)
- 1992: John S. Mayo (Bell Labs)
- 1993: George H. Heilmeier (Bellcore)
- 1994: Walter L. Robb (General Electric)
- 1995: John J. Wise (Mobil)
- 1996: Robert A. Frosch (General Motors)
- 1997: Donald E. Elson (Black & Decker)
- 1998: Arno A. Penzias (Bell Labs/Lucent)
- 1999: John Seely Brown (Xerox)
- 2000: Gordon F. Brunner (Procter & Gamble)
- 2001: Philip Needleman (Pharmacia)
- 2002: Charles W. Deneka (Corning)
- 2003: Lewis S. Edelheit (General Electric)
- 2004: John W. Miley (Milliken & Company)
- 2005: Paul M. Horn (IBM)
- 2006: David O. Swain (Boeing)
- 2007: Nabil Y. Sakkab (Procter & Gamble)
- 2008: Ralph Snyderman (Duke University & Proventys, Inc.)
- 2009: Norman R. Augustine (Lockheed Martin)
- 2010: Nicholas M. Donofrio (IBM)
- 2011: Uma Chowdhry (DuPont)
- 2012: F. Emil Jacobs, (ExxonMobil)
- 2013: Robert S. Langer (MIT), and George M. Whitesides (Harvard University)
- 2014: Joseph DeSimone, (UNC)
- 2015: Subra Suresh (Carnegie Mellon University)
- 2016: Peter H. Diamandis (XPRIZE Foundation) and Vinton G. Cerf (Google)
- 2017: Joi Ito (Director, MIT Media Lab) and Henry Chesbrough
- 2018: Yann LeCun
- 2019: Leroy Hood
- 2020: David Wineland
- 2021: Demis Hassabis (CEO of DeepMind)

== See also ==
- Industrial Research Institute
- IRI Achievement Award
- Maurice Holland Award
