= William Robert Graham =

American physicist, former NASA official

William Graham
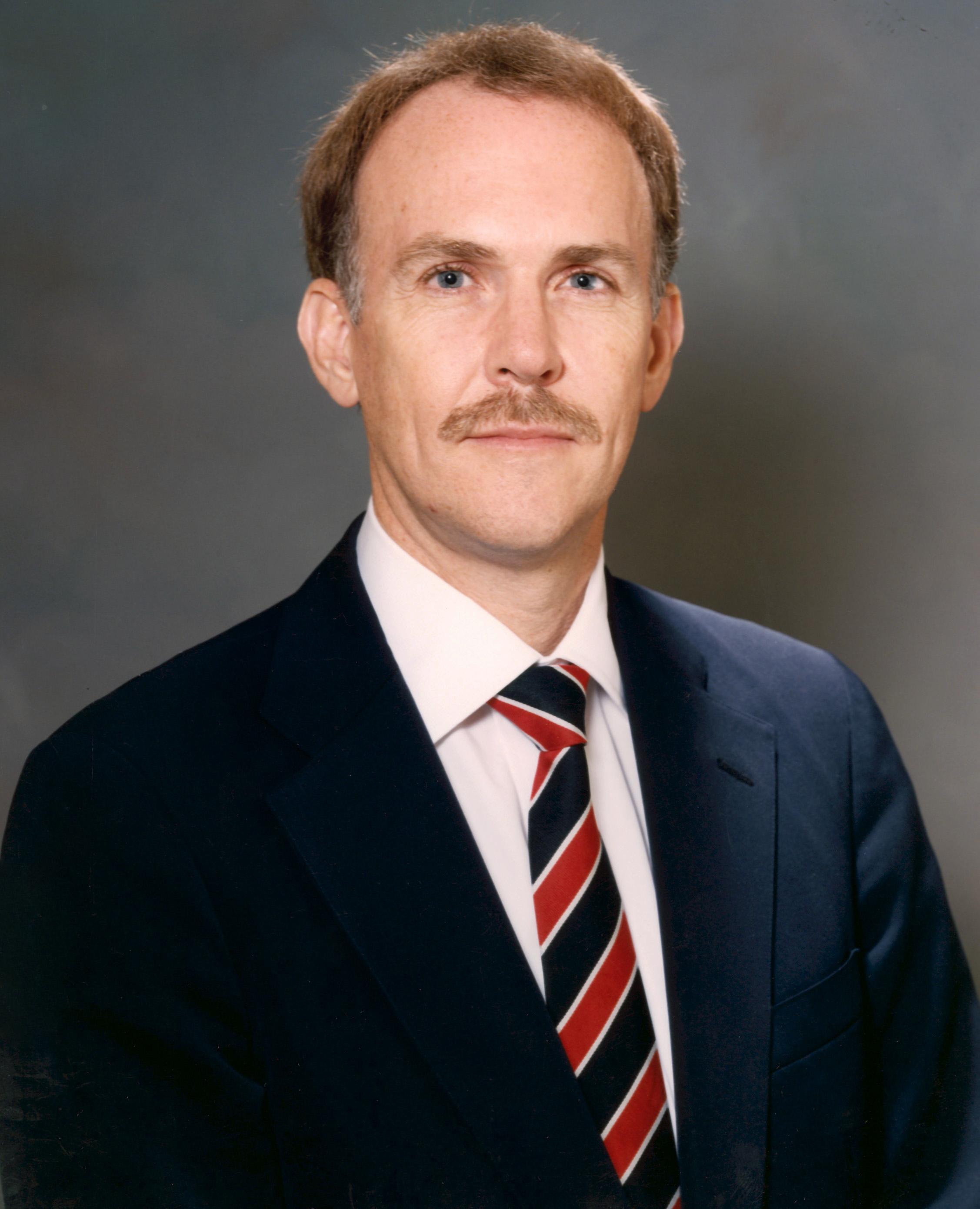

4th Director of the Office of Science and Technology Policy
- In office October 2, 1986 – June 1989
- President: Ronald Reagan; George H. W. Bush
- Preceded by: Richard Johnson (Acting)
- Succeeded by: Thomas P. Rona (Acting)

Administrator of the National Aeronautics and Space Administration
- Acting
- In office December 4, 1985 – May 11, 1986
- President: Ronald Reagan
- Preceded by: James M. Beggs
- Succeeded by: James C. Fletcher

Personal details
- Born: June 15, 1937 (age 89) San Antonio, Texas, U.S.
- Education: California Institute of Technology (BS); Stanford University (MS, PhD)
- Scientific career
- Fields: Physics
- Workplaces: Air Force Weapons Laboratory; Rand Corporation; NASA
- Thesis: Electro-optical generation of electromagnetic radiation (1963)

William Robert Graham (born June 15, 1937) is an American physicist who was chairman of President Reagan's General Advisory Committee on Arms Control from 1982 to 1985, a deputy administrator and acting administrator of NASA during 1985 and 1986, and director of the White House Office of Science and Technology Policy and concurrently science adviser to President Reagan from 1986 to 1989. He then served as an executive in national security-related companies.

Born in San Antonio, Texas, Graham received a B.S. degree in physics from the California Institute of Technology with Honors in 1959. In addition, he earned an M.S. degree in engineering science in 1961, and a Ph.D. in electrical engineering in 1963, both from Stanford University.

Graham served three years active duty as a project officer with the Air Force Weapons Laboratory at Kirtland Air Force Base, Albuquerque, New Mexico, directing a group conducting experimental and theoretical research on strategic system survivability. Graham later spent six years with the Rand Corporation in Santa Monica, California, and jointly founded R&D Associates in 1971.

In 1980, Graham served as an adviser to presidential candidate Ronald Reagan and was a member of the president-elect's transition team. From 1982 to 1985, he served as chairman of the General Advisory Committee on Arms Control and Disarmament, having been nominated by the President and confirmed by the Senate in 1982. While chairing the General Advisory Committee, he led the preparation of the report "A Quarter Century of Soviet Compliance Practices Under Arms Control Commitments: 1958-1983", which was submitted to the President and to Congress in 1984.

On September 12, 1985, Graham was nominated by President Reagan for the position of Deputy Administrator of NASA. He was confirmed by the United States Senate on November 18, and sworn in on November 25, 1985. For a period from December 4, 1985, to May 11, 1986, Graham served as the acting administrator of NASA following the resignation of James M. Beggs. It was on his watch as acting administrator that the Space Shuttle Challenger was launched in frigid weather, leading O-rings on the Shuttle's SRBs to fail, destroying the Shuttle. Graham left NASA on October 1, 1986, to become director of the White House Office of Science and Technology Policy (OSTP). On October 16, 1986, he was sworn in as director of OSTP and concurrently as science adviser to President Reagan, positions he held until June 1989, when he left government service to join Jaycor, a high-technology company headquartered in San Diego, California. He later served as the chairman and CEO of National Security Research, Inc. from 1997 to 2005.

Graham has also been a consultant to the Office of the Secretary of Defense and served on many international and national boards and advisory groups, including the National Academy of Sciences/National Research Council Committee on Undersea Warfare and Board on Army Science and Technology, the Air Force Science Advisory Board Task Force on Manned Strategic System Vulnerability, the U.S.-U.K. Joint Working Group on Atomic Weapons, the Defense Nuclear Agency Scientific Advisory Group on Effects, and the Defense Science Board System Vulnerability Task Force and Associated Task Forces. He was a member of the Defense Science Board from 2001 through 2008 where he led several studies, and was also a member of the State Department's International Security Advisory Board from 2006 through 2008.

In 1998, Graham served on the Rumsfeld Commission, which investigated the ballistic missile threat to the United States for the Congress, and in 2000 served on the Commission to Assess United States National Security Space Management and Organization, also mandated by Congress. He chaired the statutory Commission to Assess the Threat to the United States from Electromagnetic Pulse (EMP) Attack from 2001 through 2008, which issued several reports, including a report entitled "Critical National Infrastructures" in 2008.

== EMP warnings ==
Graham warned several times about the dangers of a nuclear electromagnetic pulse attack (EMP).

In a Congress hearing in 2008 he affirmed that about 90 percent of the US population could perish during such an attack: "We think that is in the correct range. We don't have experience with losing the infrastructure in a country with 300 million people, most of whom don't live in a way that provides for their own food and other needs. We can go back to an era when people did live like that. That would be - 10 percent would be 30 million people, and that is probably the range where we could survive as a basically rural economy."

In a 2017 article he warned about the strategic significance of North Korean satellites' ability to generate an EMP attack, as well as widespread ignorance about an EMP.

Government offices
Preceded by Hans Mark	Deputy Administrator of the National Aeronautics and Space Administration; 1985–1986	Succeeded by Dale D. Myers
Preceded by James M. Beggs	Administrator of the National Aeronautics and Space Administration; Acting; 1985–1986	Succeeded by James C. Fletcher
Preceded by Richard Johnson; Acting	Director of the Office of Science and Technology Policy; 1986–1989	Succeeded by Thomas P. Rona; Acting
