= Ralph Snyderman =

American academic administrator

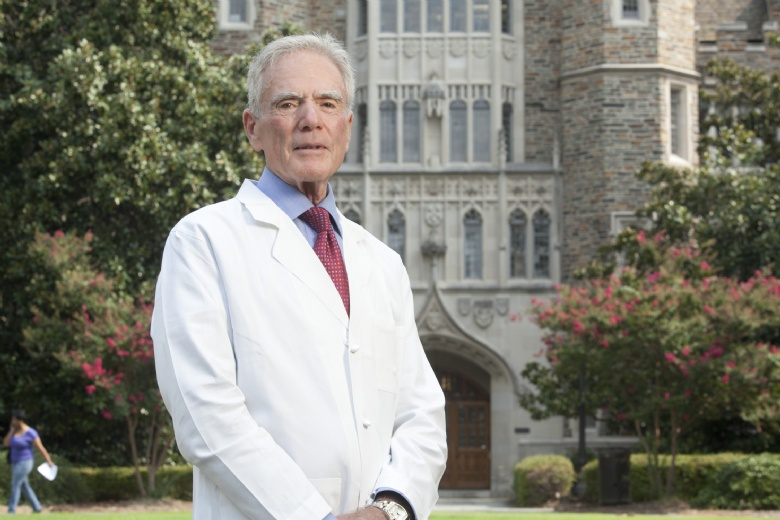
- Born: March 13, 1940 (age 86); Brooklyn, NY
- Education: B.S. Washington College, Chestertown, MD (1961) M.D. State University of New York, Downstate Medical Center (1965)
- Title: Chancellor Emeritus, Duke University; James B. Duke Professor of Medicine, Duke University School of Medicine; Executive Director, Duke Center for Personalized Health Care
- Board member of: CareDx iRhythm Technologies

Ralph Snyderman is a Chancellor Emeritus at Duke University, James B. Duke Professor of Medicine, and Executive Director of the Duke Center for Personalized Health Care. He served as chancellor for health affairs and dean of the School of Medicine from 1989 to July 2004. Under his leadership, Duke University created the Duke University Health System (DUHS) to develop and operate a comprehensive health delivery system, and he was its founding President and Chief Executive Officer. DUHS, with its practice networks, ambulatory care centers, home health services, community hospitals, university hospital, and satellite collaborations demonstrated the power of academic medicine to deliver the best of care to broad communities. Snyderman helped lead the creation of the largest academic clinical research organization worldwide. During his tenure, Duke University Hospital was ranked 6th overall in the nation and its medical school ranked 4th. Snyderman is a leader in the conception and development of personalized health care, an evolving model of national health care delivery. He has articulated the need to move the current focus of health care from the treatment of disease-events to personalized, predictive, preventive, and participatory care that is focused on the patient. As Senior Vice-President at Genentech, he led the development of powerful new molecular biology therapeutics. Ralph Snyderman was the recipient of the 2012 David E. Rogers Award from the Association of American Medical Colleges which recognized him as "The Father of Personalized Medicine." He is a member of the Association of American Medical Colleges (chair 2002-2003), Association of American Physicians (President 2003-2004), American Academy of Arts & Sciences, and the National Academy of Medicine.

== Early life and education ==
Snyderman was born on March 13, 1940, in Brooklyn, New York, the son of Russian immigrants Morris and Ida (Candeub) Snyderman. He grew up in the Bensonhurst area of Brooklyn. He was a 1961 graduate of Washington College in Chestertown, Maryland, and received his MD Magna Cum Laude in 1965 from SUNY Downstate Medical Center. He served his internship and residency in medicine at Duke and later worked as a Public Health Officer doing research in immunology at the National Institutes of Dental and Craniofacial Research from 1967-72. There, he had the opportunity to learn how to separate proteins, measure cellular chemotaxis, and make an important biomedical breakthrough early in his career: the discovery of complement factor 5a (C5a) as an immune cell chemotactic agent while the field was still in its infancy.

== Career ==
Snyderman accepted his first faculty appointment at Duke in 1972. His laboratory successfully discovered important aspects of the role of the complement system and cytokines in leukocyte migration and innate immunity. By 1984, he was the Frederic M. Hanes Professor of Medicine and Immunology and chief of the Division of Rheumatology and Immunology. His research into how white blood cells respond to chemical signals to mediate host defense or tissue damage was internationally recognized. In 1987, Snyderman left Duke to join Genentech, Inc., the pioneering biomedical technology firm, as Senior Vice President for medical research and development. While at Genentech, he led the development and licensing of major biotechnology therapeutics including Activase, a clot-busting drug made through the novel approach of recombinant DNA technology. He returned to Duke in 1989 as Chancellor for Health Affairs, Duke University, a position he held until 2004. Since then, Snyderman established and leads the Duke Center for Personalized Health Care which provides a platform for research directed at developing new models of care. Snyderman has served on numerous corporate boards of directors, including Procter & Gamble, Press Ganey, Purdue Pharma, SAIC (Science Applications International Corporation), and Trevena. He was named as a defendant in the Massachusetts Attorney General's complaint against the company in 2019 in connection with his board membership from 2012 through 2017. This case was subsequently settled with the Mass AG.

== Research ==
Snyderman's research focused on defining the mechanisms by which leukocytes accumulate at sites of inflammation. He developed the first reliable in vitro technology to quantify leukocyte chemotaxis. His work led to the standard methodology to study this critical component of inflammation. He identified C5a, a cleavage product of the fifth component of complement (C), as a major chemotactic factor which was produced by C activation or by proteolytic cleavage of C5. Snyderman's work helped open the field of inflammation research to scientific analysis and lay the foundation of our current understanding of leukocyte activation by chemoattractants and chemokine production by activated mononuclear cells.

Snyderman's current work is focused on the development and implementation of Personalized Health Care – a personalized, predictive, preventive, and participatory approach to care. This concept is facilitating the transformation of health care from the current disease-oriented approach to one that focuses on personalized health planning and is increasingly seen as a solution to our national health care dilemma. The Duke Center for Personalized Health Care fosters the adoption of proactive, personalized, and patient-driven care into clinical practice, develops and tests novel clinical approaches to deliver personalized health care and functions as a think tank to foster innovation in health care delivery. The center is currently working on multiple projects to study the feasibility and clinical outcomes of integrating personalized health care into ongoing clinical settings.

Snyderman has contributed to over 400 scientific manuscripts.

== Honors and awards ==
- 1978 McLaughlin Award for Inflammation Research
- 1985 Humboldt Senior Scientist Award, Federal Republic of Germany
- 1992 Ciba-Geigy Morris Ziff Award, for lifetime achievements in inflammation research
- 1993 Bonazinga Award for Excellence in Leukocyte Biology Research
- 2003 Ellis Island Medal of Honor
- 2003 Bravewell Leadership Award
- 2007 Leadership in Personalized Medicine Award from the Personalized Medicine Coalition
- 2008 Industrial Research Institute (IRI) Medal
- 2008 Frost & Sullivan's 2008 North American HealthCare Lifetime Achievement Award
- 2010 Bioscience Leader Emeriti by the North Carolina Association for Biomedical Research
- 2011 William B. Anlyan, MD, Lifetime Achievement Award
- 2012 David E. Rogers Award from the Association of American Medical Colleges
- 2014 North Carolina Life Sciences Leadership Award
- 2016 Personalized Medicine World Conference's Pioneer Award
