= Research-on-Research Committee =

The Research-on-Research (ROR) Committee was created by the Arlington, Virginia Industrial Research Institute in 1968 to fill in a perceived gap in the arena of technological research and development (R&D). The Committee oversees working groups which examine current research on a particular topic, to identify best practices for effective management of R&D. The working groups, under loose supervision by the Committee, meet several times a year, usually at IRI-sponsored events,. Their findings are typically published in IRI’s bimonthly journal, Research-Technology Management (RTM).

IRI’s ROR meetings provide a forum for practitioners of R&D management and technological innovation to share best practices, current undertakings, and planning at their respective organizations in relation to innovation management.

== History ==
IRI’s Board of Directors formed an ROR Subcommittee in 1968, following an unsuccessful effort to convince the National Science Foundation (NSF) to establish research-on-research centers at U.S. universities. The subcommittee concluded that the field was important enough that the idea should be developed even without NSF support). A standing committee was created in 1971 to carry out research about the process of research in industry.

The first Committee had six members, plus a representative from the IRI Board of Directors. Its first action was to appoint five project subcommittees to address selected topics identified by a 1969 survey that were considered important to the IRI membership. Jason Salsbury, the first chair of the ROR Committee, explained “More than any other area, R&D is managed by policies and practices stemming from folklore rather than facts. Thus, the goal of the ROR Committee is to develop pertinent factual information on a variety of topics about the research process of interest to IRI members, working through its subcommittees.”

The Committee now supports twelve to fifteen working groups, each focused on a particular area of concern. Each group brings together industry leaders in research, technology, and innovation to collaborate, share experiences, and research case studies to determine best practices in the group’s focus area. .

=== Organization and Purpose of ROR Committee ===
The ROR Committee acts as a steering committee within IRI, providing guidance and oversight to the working groups, though the members are not necessarily a part of the working groups themselves. The Committee is composed of six or seven people from IRI member companies who meet with prospective co-chairs of the various working groups to draw up timelines, methodologies, and deliverables. The leadership also checks to ensure continued progress on research topics. The purpose of the ROR Committee, as outlined by IRI, is to:

- develop and communicate a galvanizing strategic plan for the ROR working groups consistent with the long-range needs of IRI's stakeholders;
- create new ROR projects that address major issues of the IRI membership, including emerging IRI constituencies such as the electronics, software, and communications industries;
- actively manage the ROR project portfolio to assure that projects are solidly initiated, well directed, and aggressively executed to generate high value for the IRI membership;
- maintain active liaison with other IRI committees and networks, and with entities outside IRI that are engaged in key interests of the ROR; and,
- utilize the ROR portion of the IRI Website as a strategic marketing tool for delivering products to the IRI membership and generating new member interest.

=== Purpose of ROR Working Groups ===
The ROR working groups are voluntary and temporary, with individuals working on a defined problem for a predetermined time, and then disbandingn. The purpose of the ROR working groups, according to IRI, is to:

- identify and promote effective techniques for the organization and management of research, development, and engineering in support of technological innovation;
- encourage high standards in technological innovation;
- develop methods for determining the effectiveness of technological innovation, and promote an understanding of the value of technological innovation to the economy, industry, and society;
- strengthen understanding of business issues by technology leaders as well as business leaders’ understanding of the technological innovation process;
- foster cooperation on a worldwide basis with academia, government, and other organizations active in technological innovation; and,
- provide member-company representatives a forum for building a network of contacts among their peers.

== Past ROR Committee Chairs ==
- 1971-72: Jason M. Salsbury (American Cyanamid)
- 1972-74: Robert E. Gee (DuPont)
- 1974-76: Ivar H. Stockel (St. Regis Paper)
- 1976-77: Robert E. Boni (Armco Steel)
- 1977-78: Glen A. Hemstock (Engelhard Minerals & Chemicals)
- 1978-80: W. Gale Cutler (Whirlpool)
- 1980-82: Joseph E. Stevenot (Procter & Gamble)
- 1982-83: James W. McDonough (Polysar)
- 1983-84: Lee W. Rivers (Allied Chemical)
- 1984-85: A. Fred Kerst (Calgon)
- 1985-86: Peter R. Bridenbaugh (Alcoa)
- 1986-87: James P. McGeer (Alcan)
- 1987-89: Michael R. Waller (Amoco Production)
- 1989-90: Graham R. Mitchell (GTE Labs)
- 1990-91: Philip H. Brodsky (Monsanto)
- 1991-92: Deb Chatterji (BOC)
- 1992-94: Gary E. McGraw (Eastman Chemical)
- 1994-95: Parry M. Norling (DuPont)
- 1995-96: Paul B. Germeraad (Avery Dennison)
- 1996-97: Donald S. Mueller (Ashland)
- 1997-98: Robert S. Wood (Rohm & Haas)
- 1998-99: E. Larry Jarrett (Witco)
- 1999-01: Miles P. Drake (Air Products)
- 2001-02: R. Kent Crawford (Square D)
- 2002-04: Albert L. Johnson (Corning)
- 2004-06: Alan D. Ayers (Energizer)
- 2006-08: James M. Scinta (ConocoPhillips)
- 2008-10: Raymond R. Cosner (Boeing)
- 2010-12: Richard R. Antcliff (NASA)

== Current ROR Working Groups ==
- Business Model Innovation Challenges
- Accelerating Implementation
- Sustainability Maturity Models
- Virtual Teams
- Accessing Internal Knowledge
- Collaboration Continuum
- Early Identification of Disruptive Technology
- Global R&D Networks
- Achieving Sustainable Innovation
- Institutionalizing Innovation Competency
- Social Networking in Business Today
- Shortage of Strategic Metals
- Integrating Design into R&D/Engineering

== Representative past ROR Working Groups ==
- R&D Leadership Skills and Styles
- Sustainability in R&D
- Gender Diversity in Technology Leadership
- Level 5 Innovation
- Advanced Marketing in R&D
- Know-How and Trade Secrets
- Critical Skills and the Retirement Bubble
- Radical Innovation III
- Radical Innovation II
- Metrics for the Fuzzy Front End
- Knowledge Management
- Discontinuous Innovation
- Value Creation from Value Innovation
- Sourcing Innovation
- IT and Innovation
- R&D Structure in a Changing World
- Global Diversity and Innovation

== See also ==
- Metascience
