= European Conference on Composite Materials =

Scientific conferences about composite materials

- Status: Active
- Genre: Scientific conference
- Begins: 1985
- Frequency: Biannually
- Country: International
- Inaugurated: 1985
- Most recent: 2 July 2024 - 5 July 2024
- Previous event: 26 June 2022 - 30 June 2022
- Next event: 21 June 2026 - 25 June 2026
- Participants: >1000
- Patron: European Society For Composite Materials
- Website: escm-eu.org

The European Conference on Composite Materials is an international scientific conference covering research on composite materials. The conference is organized by the European Society For Composite Materials and is held biannually, usually in alternance with the International Conference on Composite Materials. The topics represented at the conference include, among others, fracture and damage, multiscale modeling, durability, aging, process modeling, simulation, additive manufacturing, bio-sourced composites, material recycling and reuse of parts, and environmental impacts.

== History ==
The conference was organized for the first time in September 1985 by the European Association of Composite Materials, created one year earlier. When this association was succeeded by the European Association of Composite Materials in 1998, it assumed the conference organization.
