= Thomas O. Paine =

NASA administrator (1921–1992)

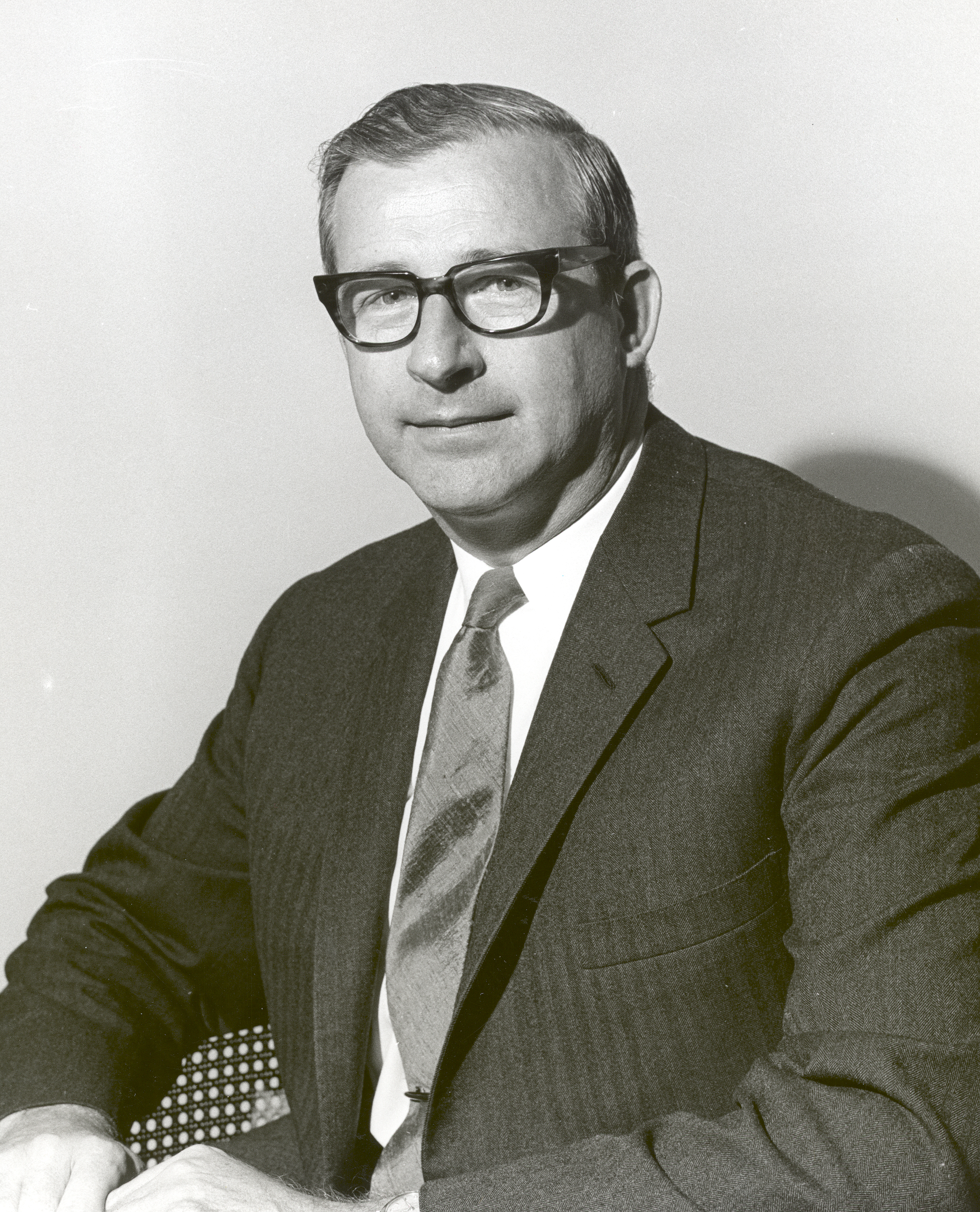

3rd Administrator of the National Aeronautics and Space Administration
- In office March 21, 1969 – September 15, 1970; Acting: October 6, 1968 – March 21, 1969
- President: Lyndon Johnson; Richard Nixon
- Preceded by: James E. Webb
- Succeeded by: James C. Fletcher

Personal details
- Born: Thomas Otten Paine; November 9, 1921 Berkeley, California, U.S.
- Died: May 4, 1992 (aged 70) Los Angeles, California, U.S.
- Spouse: Barbara Taunton Pearse
- Children: 4
- Education: Brown University (A.B.); Stanford University (M.S., PhD)

Military service
- Allegiance: United States
- Branch/service: United States Navy
- Battles/wars: World War II
- Scientific career
- Fields: Metallurgy
- Workplaces: Stanford University; General Electric
- Thesis: The effect of a molten lead-bismuth eutectic alloy on steel (1949)

Thomas Otten Paine (November 9, 1921 – May 4, 1992) was an American engineer, scientist and advocate of space exploration, and was the third administrator of NASA, serving from March 21, 1969, to September 15, 1970.

During his administration at NASA, the first crewed lunar landing by Apollo 11 was flown as were three other Apollo missions. Paine was also deeply involved in preparing plans for the post-Apollo era at NASA.

== Early life and education ==
Born in Berkeley, California, Paine attended public schools in various cities and graduated from Brown University in 1942 with an A.B. degree in engineering. At Brown, Paine joined Delta Kappa Epsilon fraternity. In World War II, he served as a submarine officer in the Pacific and in the subsequent Japanese occupation. In late 1945, Paine became the executive officer of the prize crew which sailed the Japanese aircraft-carrying submarine I-400 from Japan to Pearl Harbor. He qualified as a Navy deep-sea diver and was awarded the Commendation Medal and Submarine Combat Insignia with stars. From 1946 to 1949, Paine attended Stanford University, receiving an M.S. degree in 1947 and Ph.D. degree in 1949 in physical metallurgy. During his career, Paine received honorary Sc.D. degrees from Brown, Clarkson College of Technology, Nebraska Wesleyan University, the University of New Brunswick, Oklahoma City University, and an honorary D.Eng. degree from Worcester Polytechnic Institute.

== Career ==
=== Research scientist ===
==== Stanford University ====
Paine began his career as a research associate at Stanford University from 1947 to 1949, where he made basic studies of high-temperature alloys and liquid metals in support of naval nuclear reactor programs.

==== General Electric ====
Paine joined the General Electric Research Laboratory in Schenectady, New York, in 1949 as a research associate, where he started research programs on magnetic and composite materials. In 1951, Paine transferred to the Meter and Instrument Department of G.E. in Lynn, Massachusetts, as the manager of materials development, and later as a laboratory manager. Under Paine's management, this lab received the Award for Outstanding Contribution to Industrial Science in 1956 from the American Association for the Advancement of Science for its work in fine-particle magnet development. From 1958 through 1962, Paine was a research associate and manager of Engineering Applications at the Research and Development Center of the General Electric Company in Schenectady, N.Y., From 1963 to 1968, Paine was manager of TEMPO, the Center for Advanced Studies of General Electric located in Santa Barbara, California.

=== NASA Administrator ===
Paine was appointed Deputy Administrator of NASA on January 31, 1968. Upon the retirement of James E. Webb on October 8, 1968, he was named Acting Administrator of NASA. He was nominated as NASA's third Administrator on March 5, 1969, and confirmed by the Senate on March 20, 1969.

Paine was recruited to succeed Webb by President Lyndon Johnson. He was tasked with the responsibility of getting the Apollo program back on track in the wake of the Apollo 1 disaster, and fulfilling President John F. Kennedy's goal "before this decade is out, of landing a man on the Moon and returning him safely to the Earth."

During his administration at NASA, the first seven Apollo missions were flown, highlighted by the first human lunar landing by Apollo 11. In all, 20 astronauts orbited Earth, 24 traveled to the Moon, and 12 walked upon its surface. Many automated scientific and applications spacecraft were also flown in U.S. and cooperative international programs.

Paine was also deeply involved in preparing plans for the post-Apollo era at NASA. Along with George Mueller and others, Paine developed an ambitious plan calling for the establishment of a lunar base and a massive space station in Earth orbit before the end of the 1970s, culminating in a crewed mission to Mars as early as 1981. President Richard Nixon rejected these plans, however.

He was awarded the NASA Distinguished Service Medal.

==== Apollo 11 Goodwill Messages ====
Paine was instrumental in acquiring the sentiments of world leaders that became the Apollo 11 Goodwill Messages which now rests on the lunar surface. He personally corresponded with the heads of what became seventy-three participating nations, and coordinated the efforts to enshrine their messages on a tiny silicon disc manufactured by the Sprague Electric Company of North Adams, Massachusetts. Paine's name is also etched onto the disc.

Paine proposed the idea of the messages to the State Department's Under Secretary for Political Affairs U. Alexis Johnson. A high level committee determined that a plaque declaring that "We Came in Peace for all Mankind" and the planting of a U.S. flag on the Moon were to be part of the ceremonial activities for Neil Armstrong and Buzz Aldrin on the lunar surface.

=== Post-NASA ===
==== General Electric ====
Paine resigned from NASA September 15, 1970, to return to the General Electric Co. in New York City as vice president and group executive, Power Generation Group (worldwide ship propulsion, nuclear power, and steam and gas turbine generators), and later became senior vice president for science and technology (oversight of GE's research and development).

==== Northrop corporation ====
Paine left GE in 1976 to become the president and chief operating officer of Northrop Corporation, where he also served as a director. Paine retired as president of Northrop in 1982.

==== National Commission on Space ====
Paine designed a flag of Mars in 1984

On October 12, 1984, President Ronald Reagan issued Executive Order 12490 that commissioned a panel of experts to investigate and evaluate the future of the national space program. President Reagan appointed Paine to be the chairman of this investigation. Rather than naming the commission after himself, as is customary, he chose instead to name it The National Commission on Space. Members of the 15-member commission included Dr. Luis Alvarez (a winner of the Nobel Prize in Physics), Neil Armstrong (NASA astronaut and the first man on the Moon), Dr. Gerard K. O'Neill (American physicist and space activist), Dr. Kathryn D. Sullivan (Space Shuttle astronaut and first American woman to walk in space), Dr. Jeane Kirkpatrick (political scientist and former United States Ambassador to the United Nations) and Brigadier General Charles E. "Chuck" Yeager (rocket plane pilot and first man to break the sound barrier).

Since leaving NASA fifteen years earlier, Paine had been a vocal spokesman for an expansive future of Space exploration. The National Commission on Space took most of a year to prepare its report, conducting public hearings throughout the United States. The Commission report, Pioneering the Space Frontier, was published in May 1986. It espoused "a pioneering mission for 21st-century America... to lead the exploration and development of the space frontier, advancing science, technology, and enterprise, and building institutions and systems that make accessible vast new resources and support human settlements beyond Earth orbit, from the highlands of the Moon to the plains of Mars." The report also contained a "Declaration for Space" that included a rationale for exploring and settling the Solar System and outlined a long-range space program for the United States.

==== Thomas O. Paine Associates ====
In 1982, Paine established Thomas Paine Associates – High Technology Enterprises (TPA) in Westwood, CA, and relocated it in Santa Monica, CA, in 1986. TPA also housed Paine's 3400-volume Submarine Warfare Library, which was later donated to the Nimitz Library, U.S. Naval Academy.

==== Corporate directorships ====
Paine served as a director for many corporations, including the RCA, NBC, Eastern Air Lines, Nike, Arthur D. Little, Inc., Orbital Sciences, and Quotron Systems (a division of the Citicorp company). Paine also served as a Director of the Planetary Society, the National Space Institute, the International Academy of Astronautics, and the Pacific Forum CSIS Honolulu Hawaii. The Planetary Society honored his commitment to Mars by establishing The Thomas O. Paine Award for the Advancement of Human Exploration of Mars.

==== University trustee ====
Paine also served as a Trustee of Occidental College and Brown University and was a member of the National Academy of Engineering.

== Personal life ==
Paine was married to Barbara Helen Taunton Pearse of Perth, Australia. They had four children: Marguerite Ada, George Thomas, Judith Janet, and Frank Taunton.

Paine died of cancer at his home in the Brentwood neighborhood of Los Angeles on May 4, 1992, at the age of 70.

In 1972, Paine donated his papers to the Library of Congress, where they are currently open and available in the Manuscript Division. Although there is one container of classified material, the other 183 are open and available to researchers.

== In media ==
In the 1966 BBC TV Panorama documentary California 2000, Paine was interviewed and offered predictions on how technology will impact society.

In the 1995 film Apollo 13, Paine is played by Joe Spano. In the 1996 TV movie Apollo 11, he is played by Carmen Argenziano. In the 1998 TV miniseries From the Earth to the Moon, he is played by Sam Anderson. In the 2025 short film, Beryllium, he is played by Mike Boland.

A fictionalized Thomas O. Paine is depicted in the 2019 alternate history web television series For All Mankind. The name of the show is inspired by the inscription on the Apollo 11 lunar plaque Paine was instrumental in bringing about. In the show's setting, Paine stays on as NASA administrator until Nixon loses re-election to Ted Kennedy in 1972. He is then brought back by Reagan when elected in 1976 and remains NASA administrator until killed in the 1983 Korean Air Lines Flight 007 incident. In the show Paine is played by Dan Donohue.

Government offices
Preceded by James E. Webb	NASA Administrator; 1969 - 1970	Succeeded by James C. Fletcher
