= Dale D. Myers =

American aerospace engineer (1922–2015)

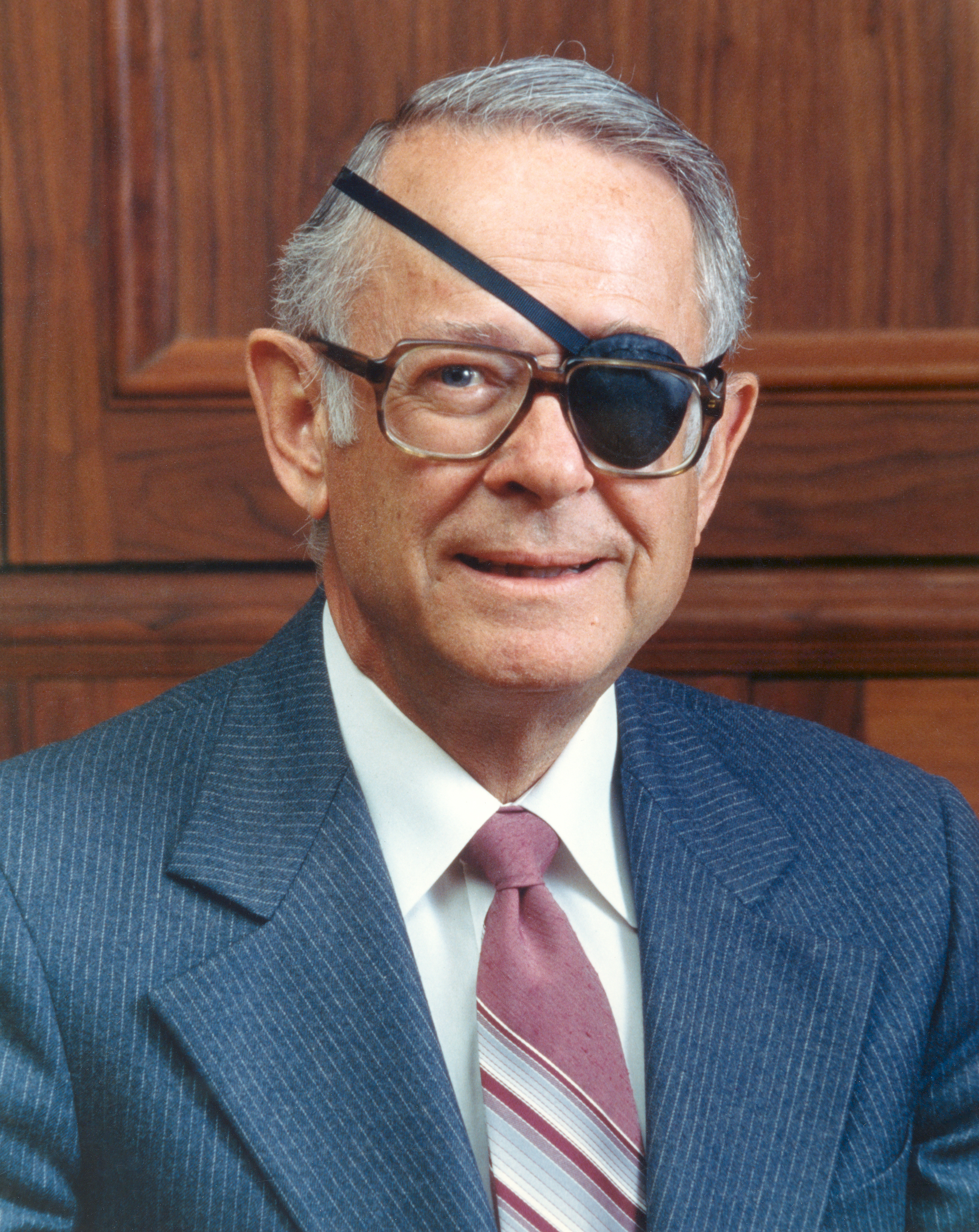
- Myers in the 1980s
- Born: Dale Dehaven Myers; January 8, 1922; Kansas City, Missouri, U.S.
- Died: May 19, 2015 (aged 93); La Costa, California, U.S.
- Education: University of Washington, B.S. 1943
- Occupations: Deputy Administrator of NASA, aerospace engineer
- Spouse: Marge Myers
- Children: 2

Signature
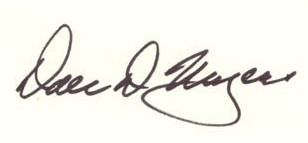

Dale Dehaven Myers (January 8, 1922 – May 19, 2015) was an American aerospace engineer who was the deputy administrator of NASA, serving between October 6, 1986, and May 13, 1989. He was born in Kansas City, Missouri, and graduated with a Bachelor of Science degree in aeronautical engineering from the University of Washington in Seattle in 1943.

== Biography ==
Myers was born in Kansas City, Missouri, on January 8, 1922, to a physician. His boyhood hero was Charles Lindbergh, an aviator who became famous after crossing the Atlantic by aircraft. Aged 5, Myers met Lindbergh and shook his hand; in a 2008 interview, Myers recalled "that did it. That did it."

Between 1939 and 1940 Myers attended Kansas City Junior College, then in 1943 he graduated from the University of Washington with a Bachelor of Science degree in aeronautical engineering. In the mid-1940s, he was involved in the development of various aircraft for Project Aerodynamicist, including the North American F-82 Twin Mustang. From 1946 until 1957 he began working in missile development, until he was selected as vice-president and weapons systems manager. By this time he had lost his left eye in an automobile accident and began wearing an eye patch.

In 1963 Myers migrated to Rockwell International, and the following year he began contract work for NASA's space program. From 1964 he was the program manager of the Apollo program's Command/Service Module Program, replacing John W. Paup. After a fire destroyed Apollo 1 and killed three astronauts in January 1967, much of the program's management was purged; Myers, however, was retained. He migrated to the Space Shuttle program in 1969, soon after Apollo 11's historic Moon landing. Myers later described his work with Apollo as a highlight of his career.

In 1970, Myers was promoted to Associate Administrator for Manned Space Flight at NASA, replacing George Mueller. In this position he stayed at mission control when Apollo 13 experienced a crippling explosion; later he promoted the selection of geologist and astronaut Harrison Schmitt as a crew member of Apollo 17. He served until 1974. During this time he earned three NASA Distinguished Service Medals, one in 1971 for his work on the Apollo program and two in 1974 (one for his work on Skylab and the Shuttle, the other for his work towards crewed spaceflight). In 1970 he also received an honorary doctorate from Whitworth College. Myers was a member of the National Academy of Engineering.

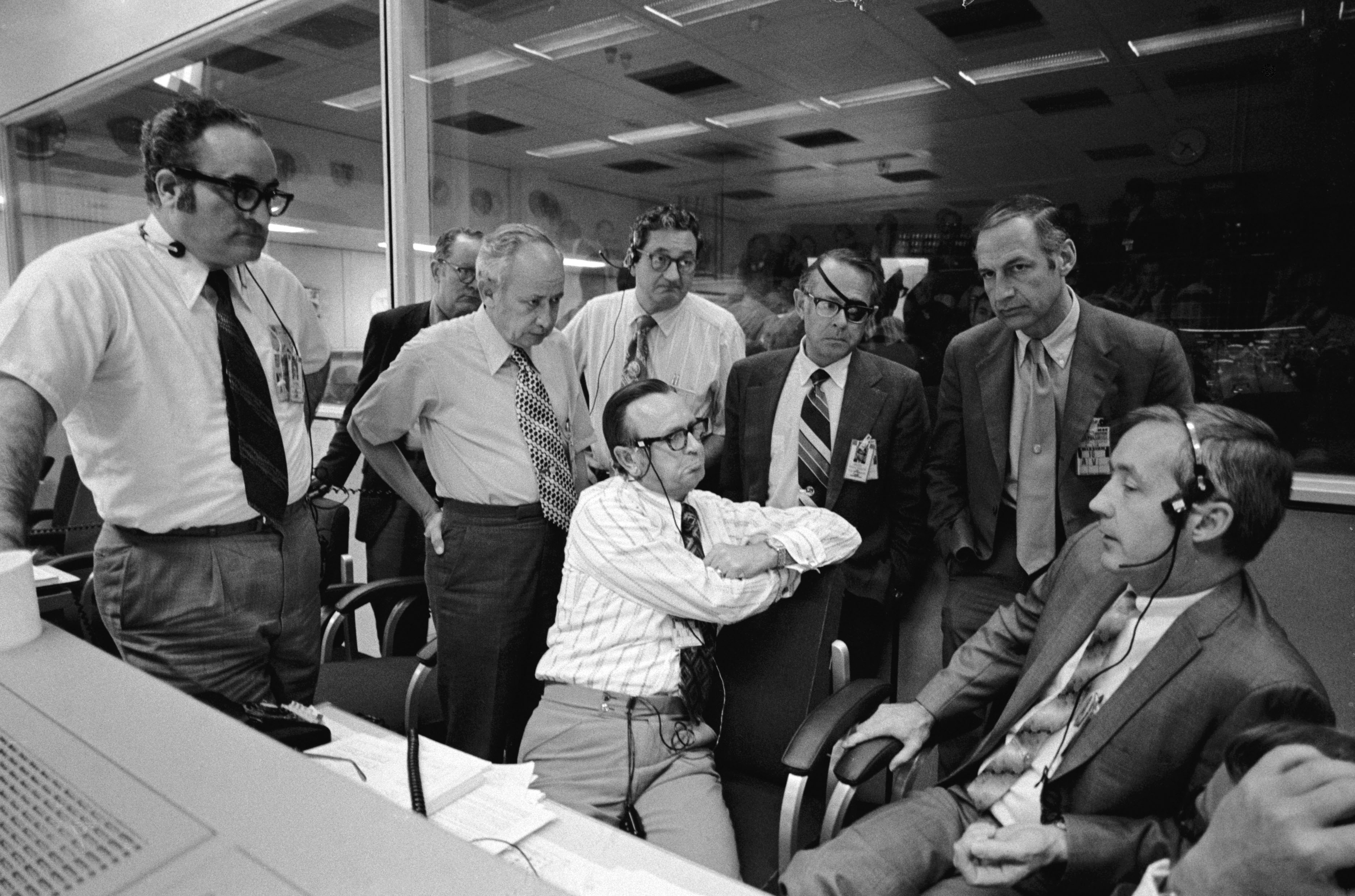
Myers, center-right, during a meeting to discuss whether Apollo 16 should land on the Moon (1972)

Afterwards he returned to Rockwell, serving as its vice president; during this period he also served as president of North American Aircraft Group, during which time the company developed the Rockwell B-1 Lancer. Myers was Under Secretary at the Department of Energy (1977–1979). For the five years, from 1979 to 1984, Myers served as president and COO of Jacobs Engineering Group; he then became a private consultant, operating his own company known as Dale D. Myers & Associates Aerospace and Energy.

On October 6, 1986, nine months after the Space Shuttle Challenger disaster, Myers was selected as Deputy Administrator of NASA. Myers was initially unwilling to accept the position, but after a telephone call from the "persuasive" president Ronald Reagan, Myers accepted the position. Replacing William Robert Graham, he was tasked with helping the agency recoup and continue the Space Shuttle program; in a Senate hearing, Myers argued that the agency had lost its "hands-on, loving care" and that the checks and balances system had "gone soft". He resigned effective May 13, 1989, having served as acting administrator in place of James C. Fletcher for almost a month. NASA historian Roger Launius credits Myers with bringing a sense of optimism to the agency following the disaster.

After leaving NASA, Myers returned to private consulting, later becoming involved in the failed Kistler Aerospace program. Myers and his wife retired in La Costa, California. He continued to speak publicly about the space program, including giving testimonial before Congress in 2003. Myers died on May 19, 2015, at La Costa Glen. He was survived by his two daughters, Janet and Barbara, five grandchildren, and three great-grandchildren. In 2016, Myers was inducted into the International Air & Space Hall of Fame at the San Diego Air & Space Museum.
