= James M. Beggs =

NASA Administrator (1926–2020)

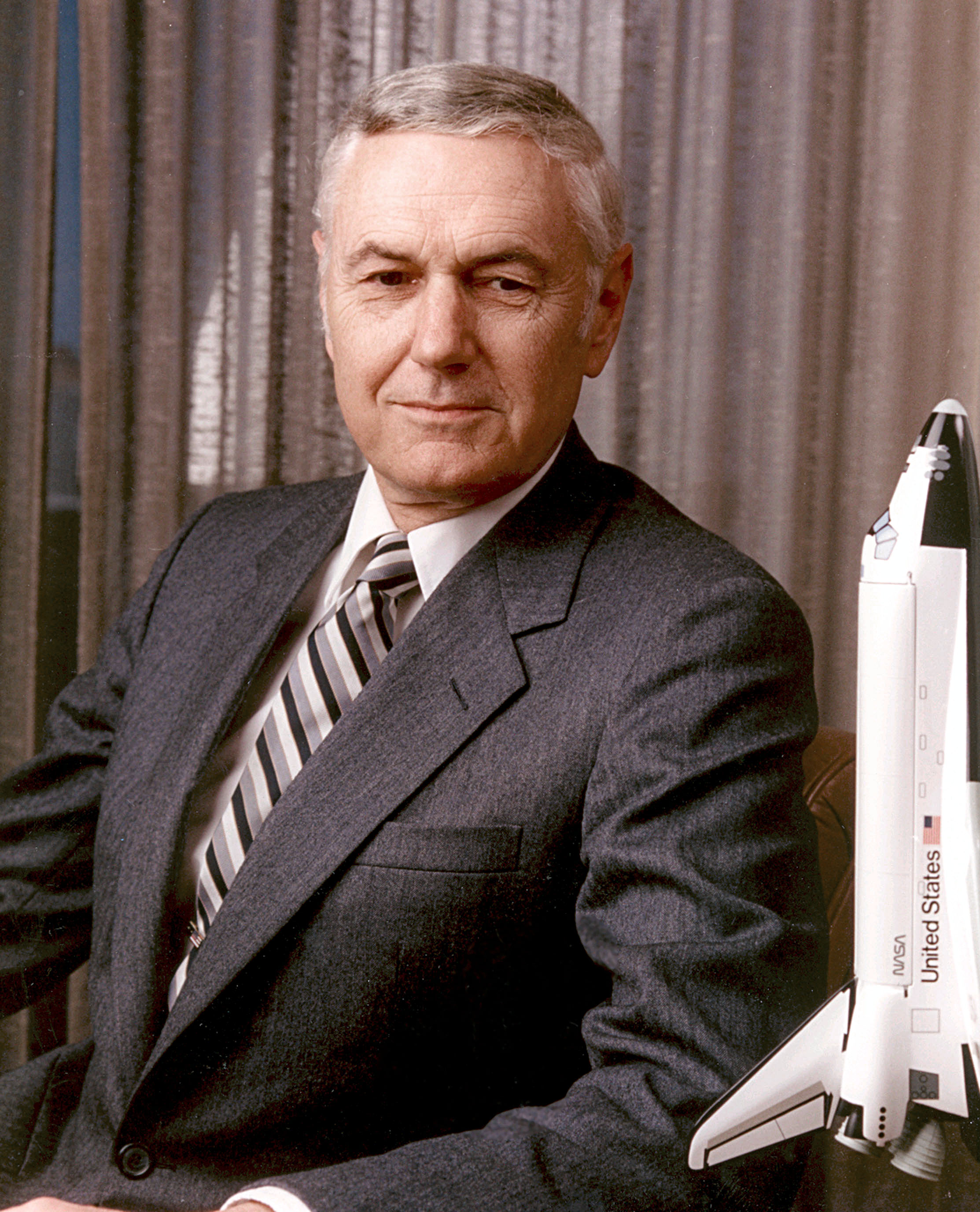

6th Administrator of the National Aeronautics and Space Administration
- In office July 10, 1981 – December 4, 1985 (de facto); February 26, 1986 (de jure)
- President: Ronald Reagan
- Preceded by: Robert A. Frosch
- Succeeded by: James C. Fletcher

Personal details
- Born: James Montgomery Beggs; January 9, 1926 Pittsburgh, Pennsylvania, U.S.
- Died: April 23, 2020 (aged 94) Bethesda, Maryland, U.S.
- Spouse: Mary Harrison
- Children: 5
- Education: United States Naval Academy; Harvard University
- Occupation: businessman, consultant, administrator

James Montgomery Beggs (January 9, 1926 – April 23, 2020) was an American businessman and consultant who served as the 6th administrator of NASA from 1981 to 1986.

== Early life and education ==
James Montgomery Beggs was born in Pittsburgh, Pennsylvania, on January 9, 1926. He graduated from the United States Naval Academy in 1947. After leaving the navy in 1954, he earned a Master of Business Administration from Harvard Business School in 1955.

== Career ==
Beggs served as an executive vice president and director of General Dynamics. He worked with NASA between 1968 and 1969 as an Associate Administrator of the Office of Advanced Research and Technology. He was an Undersecretary of Transportation from 1969 to 1973. He had served in managerial roles for various such corporations as Summa Corporation, General Dynamics, and Westinghouse prior to his work in NASA.

=== NASA Administrator ===
Beggs was appointed by President Ronald Reagan as NASA Administrator on June 1, 1981, and took office on July 10. He served until December 4, 1985, when he took an indefinite leave of absence due to an indictment for contract fraud related to activities alleged by the United States Department of Defense to have taken place prior to his tenure at NASA. This indictment was later dismissed, and the United States Attorney General apologized to Beggs for any embarrassment. Deputy Administrator William Graham took over as Acting Administrator until the appointment of James C. Fletcher, who had previously served as Administrator between 1971 and 1977, to a second term.

Beggs formally resigned on February 26, 1986, in the aftermath of the Challenger disaster. He denied knowledge of the problems related to the disaster, stating that he "had no specific concerns with the joint, the O-rings or the putty".

== Personal life and death ==
Beggs married Mary Harrison, and they had five children. After his NASA career Beggs worked as a consultant from his offices in Bethesda, Maryland, and was involved with the NASA Alumni League and the Potomac Institute for Policy Studies. Beggs died on April 23, 2020, in his Bethesda home of congestive heart failure.

Government offices
| Preceded by Robert A. Frosch | NASA Administrator; 1981–1985 | Succeeded by William Robert Graham (acting) |
