= ESCM-CL =

The eSourcing Capability Model for Client Organizations (eSCM-CL) is a capability model intended for those organizations that procure or source IT-enabled services, with two objectives: (1) to provide guidance to client organizations to help them improve their capabilities throughout the lifecycle of the supply, and (2) to provide client organizations with objective means of assessing their sourcing capabilities, delegate one or more of their information technology intensive business activities to a service provider, or to those who wish to assess their sourcing capabilities. It enables client organizations to appraise and improve their capability in fostering the development of more effective relationships, manage these relationships better, and experience less failures in their client-service provider relationship.

== Dimensions ==
The model is organized in three dimensions:

1. Sourcing Life-Cycle
2. Capability Area
3. Capability Level

== Life-cycle phases ==
The eSCM-CL model extends the eSCM-SP structure by adding another phase called "Analysis". So it includes ongoing practices together with practices in each of these phases of the sourcing life-cycle: Analysis, Initiation, Delivery and Completion.

== Capability levels ==
The eSCM-CL is organized as five capability levels:

1. Performing Sourcing
2. Consistently Managing Sourcing
3. Managing Organizational Sourcing Performance
4. Proactively Enhancing Value
5. Sustaining Excellence

== Capability areas ==
The eSCM-CL contains 95 practices grouped into 17 groups, described as capability areas:

1. Ongoing
  1. Sourcing Strategy Management
  2. Government Management
  3. Relationship Management
  4. Value Management
  5. Organizational Change Management
  6. People Management
  7. Knowledge Management
  8. Technology Management
  9. Threat Management
2. Analysis
  1. Sourcing Opportunity Analysis
  2. Sourcing Approach
3. Initiation
  1. Sourcing Planning
  2. Service Provider Evaluation
  3. Sourcing Agreements
  4. Service Transfer
4. Delivery
  1. Sourced Services Management
5. Completion
  1. Sourcing Completion

== See also ==
- eSCM (eSourcing Capability Model)
- Capability Maturity Model
