= Thomas P. Rona =

Hungarian-born American scientist (1923–1997)

Thomas Rona

Director of the Office of Science and Technology Policy
- Acting
- In office June 1989 – August 1989
- President: George H. W. Bush
- Preceded by: William Robert Graham
- Succeeded by: William Wells (Acting)

Personal details
- Born: January 7, 1923 Budapest, Hungary
- Died: December 27, 1997 (aged 74) Bethesda, Maryland, U.S.
- Education: Ecole Superieure d'Electricite (MEng); Massachusetts Institute of Technology (MSc, DSc)
- Scientific career
- Fields: Electrical engineering
- Institutions: Boeing
- Thesis: Gas temperature measurements by ultrasonic pulse method (1955)
- 0

Thomas P. Rona (1923–1997) was a 1980s era science advisor to the Defense Department and the White House under Presidents Reagan and Bush.

Born on January 7, 1923, in Budapest, Hungary, Rona graduated from École supérieure d'électricité in Paris (M.E., 1943; E.E., 1945) and Massachusetts Institute of Technology (M.S. in E.E.; Sc.D. in E.E., 1955). He received his license certificate in physical electronics at the Sorbonne in 1946. The author of several books and articles with his best known probably being Our Changing Geo-Political Premises published in 1982. Rona is often credited with coining the term "information war" in a report, "Weapon Systems and Information War," that he wrote in 1976 while at The Boeing Company. He worked in Seattle, Washington for Boeing from 1959 to 1984. (The phrase "information war" has been used at least since 1970--and probably before--when Dale Minor, a news reporter, published The Information War, examining conflicts between the media and the U.S. government, although Rona was likely the first to use the term to refer to a military or strategic concept.)

During the 1980s, Rona held various posts in the Executive Branch to include Special Assistant for Space Policy at the Department of Defense, 1984 to 1986 and Assistant Director for Government Programs in the Office of Science and Technology Policy at the White House, 1986 to 1987. On June 16, 1987, President Ronald Reagan announced Rona's nomination as Associate Director of the Office of Science and Technology Policy.

In June 1989 he briefly succeeded William Graham by becoming Acting Science Advisor to President George H. W. Bush, a position he held until President Bush's choice was available in August of that year. When Rona left government service, he did private consulting work in the general area of information warfare for companies such as Aegis Research Corporation, then headquartered in Rosslyn, Virginia.

Rona died at his home in Bethesda, Maryland, on December 27, 1997, from hypertensive cardiovascular disease.

Government offices
Preceded by William Robert Graham	Director of the Office of Science and Technology Policy; Acting; 1989	Succeeded by William Wells; Acting
