= Alan M. Lovelace =

American scientist and government official (1929–2018)

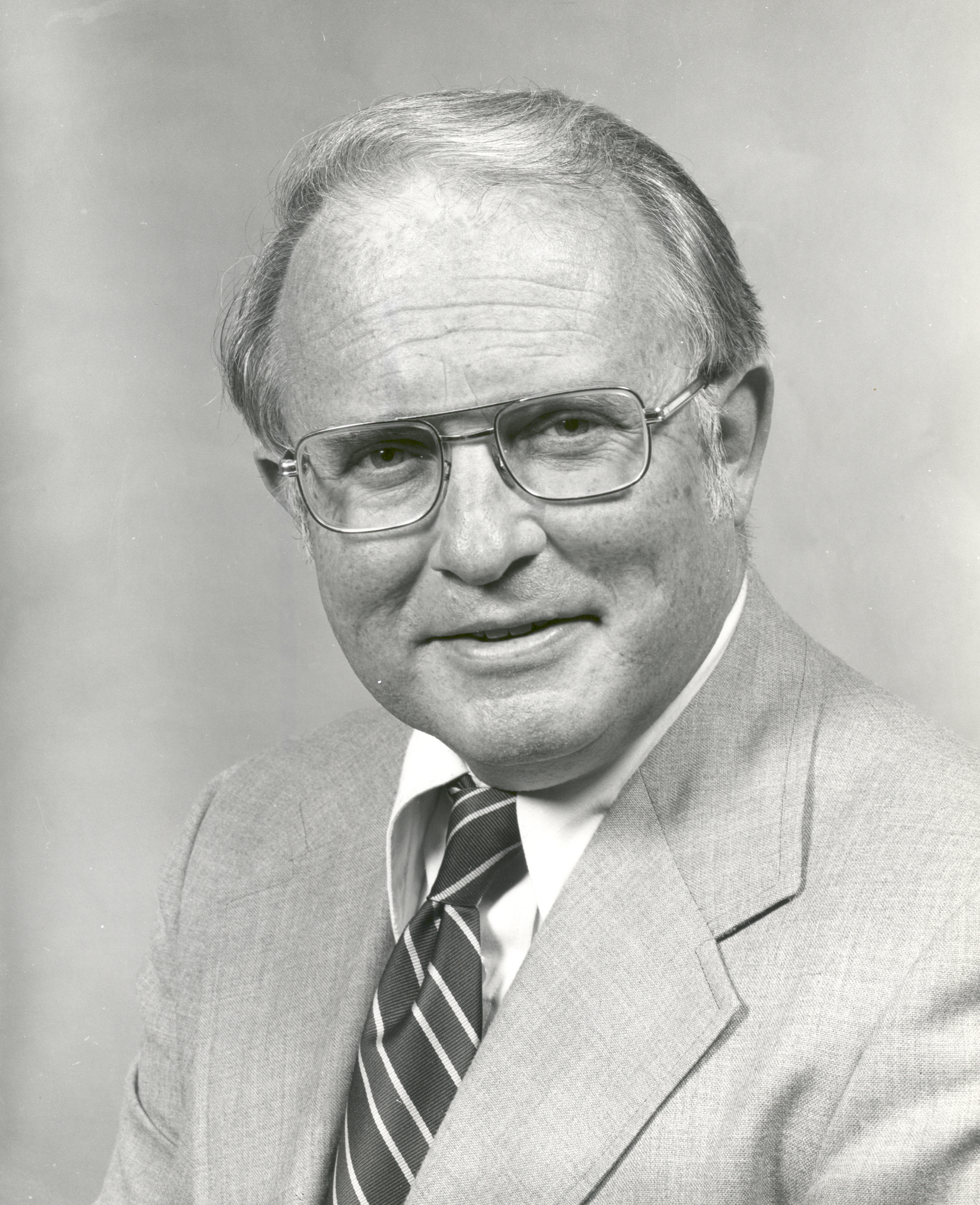
- Born: September 4, 1929; St. Petersburg, Florida, U.S.
- Died: April 18, 2018 (aged 88); Melbourne, Florida, U.S.
- Education: University of Florida in Gainesville
- Scientific career
- Fields: Organic Chemistry
- Workplaces: NASA
- Thesis: The use of the peroxide-catalyzed reactions of bromofluoromethanes in the preparation of olefins and dienes containing fluorines (1954)
- Doctoral advisor: Paul Tarrant

Alan Mathieson Lovelace (September 4, 1929 – April 18, 2018) was the deputy administrator of NASA from July 2, 1976, to July 10, 1981. He filled in as acting Administrator twice: once during the Jimmy Carter administration to fill the May 2 to June 20, 1977, vacancy left by the retirement of James C. Fletcher, and again during the start of Ronald Reagan's administration from January 21 to July 10, 1981, until Reagan's choice James M. Beggs was confirmed by Congress.

Lovelace was born in St. Petersburg, Florida. He graduated with a Bachelor of Science in chemistry from the University of Florida in Gainesville in 1951, received a Master of Science in organic chemistry in 1952 and became a Doctor of Philosophy in 1954, also in organic chemistry.

Lovelace served in the United States Air Force from 1954 to 1956. Thereafter, he began work as a government scientist at the Air Force Materials Laboratory (AFML), Wright-Patterson Air Force Base, Dayton, Ohio. There he initially did work in the field of fluorine and polymer chemistry. These efforts on fluorocarbon and inorganic polymers extended the useful temperature range over which polymers could be used.

In January 1964, he was named as chief scientist of the Air Force Materials Laboratory.

In this role, he worked to realize the potential of very high strength, very light weight fibers being consolidated in a new class of composites. In 1967, he was named director of the Air Force Materials Laboratory, and in October 1972, he was named director of science and technology for the Air Force Systems Command at its Headquarters, Andrews Air Force Base, Maryland. In this role, he provided technical guidance and management policy to eleven Air Force Systems Command Laboratories, five Liaison Officers, and the Command's European Office of Aerospace Research.

In September 1973, he became the principal deputy to the assistant secretary of the Air Force for research and development. In this role, he advised and assisted the assistant secretary in his direction of the entire Air Force Research and Development Program. In September 1974, he left the Department of Defense to become the associate administrator of the NASA Office of Aeronautics and Space Technology. As the associate administrator for aeronautics and space technology, he was responsible for the management of the research program that will provide the basic science and technology advances that will be required for future military and civil aircraft, and the systems to exploit and explore space.

During his career he became a Fellow in the American Astronautical Society; he also became a member of the National Academy of Engineering, American Institute of Aeronautics and Astronautics, the Air Force Association, Sigma Xi, and Phi Beta Kappa. In June 1981, Lovelace was also presented with the Presidential Citizens Medal by President Ronald Reagan.

He retired from NASA to accept a position as Corporate Vice President – Science and Engineering with the General Dynamics Corporation at St. Louis, Missouri. By 1985 he had become Corporate Vice President and General Manager of General Dynamics' Space System Division. Later he became chief architect and head of the corporation's commercial Atlas space launch initiative, overseeing development of the Atlas I, II, IIA and IIAS launch vehicles. In 1991 he was named senior vice president for Space Policy and Technology at General Dynamics, operating from an office in Washington, D.C., as well as serving as chairman of the company's Commercial Launch Services subsidiary.

Lovelace died at an assisted living facility in Melbourne, Florida, on April 18, 2018.

== Sources ==
- NASA – Goddard News
