= ESourcing Capability Model =

The eSourcing Capability Models (eSCMs) are a framework developed by ITSqc at Carnegie Mellon University in order to improve the relationship between IT service providers and their customers.

These services can be very different: IT outsourcing, IT hosting, application development and maintenance outsourcing, networking services, business process outsourcing.

The eSCM framework is twofold: eSCM-CL for client organizations and eSCM-SP for service providers. These two models are consistent, symmetrical and complementary for each side of the client-provider relationship and this is the strength and the uniqueness of this framework.

== See also ==
- eSCM-CL
- eSCM-SP
- Capability Maturity Model
