= International Conference on Composite Materials =

- Status: active
- Genre: Scientific conference
- Frequency: Biannually
- Country: International
- Years active: 40
- Inaugurated: 1975
- Website: iccm-central.org

International Conference on Composite Materials (ICCM) is an international scientific conference devoted to all aspects of composite materials. The list of topics includes manufacturing, mechanics, fracture and damage, fatigue, design of components and structures, impact behavior, experimental methods.

== History ==
The conference was initiated by the Metallurgical Society of AIME. The first conference was held in 1975 simultaneously in Geneva and Boston and was rather small. The second conference, ICCM-2, held in 1978 in Toronto, Canada, gathered around 300 delegates. Official welcome was given by Frank Thurston, Director of the National Aeronautical Establishment, Ottawa; the key address was given by Alan Lovelace from NASA.

== List of events ==
Event	Year	City	Country
ICCM-24	2025	Baltimore	USA
ICCM-23	2023	Belfast	UK
ICCM-22	2019	Melbourne	Australia
ICCM-21	2017	Xi'an	China
ICCM-20	2015	Copenhagen	Denmark
ICCM-19	2013	Montreal	Canada
ICCM-18	2011	Jeju Island	Korea
ICCM-17	2009	Edinburgh	Scotland
ICCM-16	2007	Kyoto	Japan
ICCM-15	2005	Durban	S. Africa
ICCM-14	2003	San Diego, California	USA
ICCM-13	2001	Beijing	China
ICCM-12	1999	Paris	France
ICCM-11	1997	City of Gold Coast	Australia
ICCM-10	1995	Whistler, British Columbia	Canada
ICCM-9	1993	Madrid	Spain
ICCM-8	1991	Honolulu	USA
ICCM-7	1989	Guangzhou	China
ICCM-6	1987	London	UK
ICCM-5	1985	San Diego	USA
ICCM-4	1982	Tokyo	Japan
ICCM-3	1980	Paris	France
ICCM-2	1978	Toronto	Canada
ICCM-1	1975	Geneva & Boston	Switzerland & USA
