= NASA Alumni League =

NASA Alumni League (NAL) is a U.S. organization that supports people that have worked for or at NASA or its predecessor NACA, to stay connected, and to "support the nation's space programs with technical expertise, educational outreach, and financial contributions to STEM organizations." The organization operates across the nation, also with state chapters that allow patrons to network locally. Three goals of NAL in the early 21st century were to "communicate with the NASA community", "to aid the NASA community with its comprehension of engineering and science, and "encourage members to participate in community service and in turn, encourage a dedication to the pursuit of scientific knowledge that benefits all humankind. " NAL is not part of NASA or the U.S. government, it is a non-profit organization founded in 1986.

The NASA Alumni League comprises groups of individuals who were former members of the National Aeronautics and Space Administration (NASA); the National Advisory Committee for Aeronautics (NACA); or the Jet Propulsion Laboratory (JPL). Any former employee of another federal government agency, including military personnel, who served an extended detail assignment at NASA for one year or longer is also eligible for membership. Any other person who was employed by NASA as a "Special Employee" for the purpose of accomplishing a special focused assignment lasting one year or more is also eligible.

== Guiding Principles ==
NASA Alumni League (NAL) chapters focus on supporting space and aeronautics programs by bringing members together in sessions to provide a broad base of information for members and the public, including:

- Sessions oriented towards educational outreach, including demonstrations by high school and college students.
- Scholarships to students in Science, Technology, Engineering, and Mathematics (STEM) studies.
- Grants to schools or organizations encouraging student interest in science, mathematics, and technology.
- Bringing students at all levels to a day at a NASA Center to learn by experience: meeting an engineer, scientist, or astronaut.
- Events to encourage public interest and participation in technical and/or professional matters related to the exploration of space.
- Publishing information of value to its members as well as other scientific and professional groups.

== NASA Center Chapters ==
The NAL consists of active chapters from two NASA centers: the Johnson Space Center chapter and the Kennedy Space Center chapter. Other NASA centers have alumni organizations that are not affiliate with the NAL. These are the Langley Research Center Alumni Association, the Goddard Space Flight Center Retirees and Alumni Association, and the NASA/Marshall Space Flight Center Retirees Association.

== NAL-Johnson Space Center (NAL-JSC) Chapter ==
The NAL-JSC chapter was formed by former JSC Center Director Jerry Griffin in 1989. The chapter consists of over 650 active members (as of 2023). Its purpose is to:

- Provide financial support to STEM organizations, primarily local elementary schools
- Communicate with the JSC alumni community
- Provide technical and advisory services to JSC as requested
- Provide social opportunities and fellowship among members
- Support historical preservation of NASA programs, projects, and organizations
- Support educational outreach programs to inspire students to pursue STEM careers
- Provide members educational information to keep them appraise of NASA programs and projects

The all-volunteer governing board of the NAL-JSC consists of four officers--President, Vice President, Secretary, and Treasurer--and ten Directors. All officers and directors are members in good standing elected by the active members for a two-year term of office beginning in October of even-numbered years. There is no limit on the number of consecutive terms that an individual may serve. Between-election vacancies are filled by appointment of the Board of Directors.

== NAL-Kennedy Space Center (NAL-KSC) Chapter ==
- (To be supplied)

== Canaveral Council of Technical Societies and Space Congress). ==
There were big gatherings of aerospace and people called the Space Congress that started during the early days of the Space-age. In the 20th century over 1000 aerospace professionals would gather to discuss space and present technical papers.

The Canaveral Council of Technical Societies (CCTS) was formed in 1959 to coordinate better communication and interface among the many technical societies in the Cape Canaveral area. This led to the establishment of an annual technical conference now known as Space Congress. CCTS' first technical symposium took place in Daytona Beach on October 26–28, 1962 and was called the Canaveral Council Fall Conference. The program consisted of a get-acquainted party on Friday; technical addresses and technical workshops, a luau, a conference summary, and family activities on Saturday; and a golf tournament and fashion show on Sunday.

Two years later, the CCTS held the first Space Congress in Cocoa Beach, Florida on April 20–22, 1964, with the theme, "Where Are We Going in Space?" Thirty-one papers were presented and three luncheon speakers, an opening speaker, and keynote speaker addressed the assemblage. Eighteen organizations from industry, NASA, and the U.S. Air Force contributed exhibits. The proceedings were published.

Since 1964, all CCTS Space Congresses have been held in Cocoa Beach and Cape Canaveral, Florida. In 1965, the growing list of events included authors' breakfasts, a banquet, evening sessions, and an international session, an exhibitors' cocktail party, and launch area tours. By 1966, the Congress had grown to four days in length and was being held on an annual basis. The 1993 Space Congress was quite large and event feature included matched suits for the organizers and mugs with logos. The motto for the 1993 Space Congress was Yesterday's vision is tomorrow's reality. The last week-long Space Congress was held in 1994.

In 2012, CCTS sponsored a single-day Space Congress that featured technical briefings at the Florida Solar Energy Center in Cocoa, Florida. This event was well received and provided the necessary local interest for CCTS to begin planning for annual Space Congress events starting in 2014.

In 2015 the Canaveral Council of Technical Societies hosted a Space Congress. U.S. Representative Bill Posey sent a video message to the event. Also, former U.S. astronaut Winston Scott was there.

== SpaceTEC ==
A consortium of industry, academia, and government representatives known as the Community Colleges for Innovative Technology Transfer, a not-for-profit Florida corporation. was founded in 1994 to provide technician education for Geographic Information Systems. Community Colleges for Innovative Technology Transfer received one of the first National Science Foundation grants for two-year community and technical colleges. The founding partners were all located near NASA or Department of Defense locations, providing a consortium strongly linked to post-secondary education programs for the nation's technical workforce in aerospace and defense.

Community Colleges for Innovative Technology Transfer, was restructured in 2009 and renamed SpaceTEC Partners, Inc. (SPI) to reflect a growing expansion of activities to technical education programs beyond aerospace. The mission of SPI is to create and implement an industry-driven, government-endorsed, technical education process that be shared with other educational venues.

SpaceTEC® is one of the Advanced Technological Education (ATE) Centers funded by the National Science Foundation (NSF) for developing partnerships between academic institutions and industry partners to promote improvement in the education of science and engineering technicians at the undergraduate and secondary school levels. With an emphasis on two-year colleges, the ATE program focuses on the education of technicians for the high-technology fields that drive the world's economies.

Located in Cape Canaveral, FL, SpaceTEC® supports the education and credentialing of aerospace technicians in six core areas and three advanced disciplines: (1) space vehicle processing activities (2) aerospace manufacturing; and (3) composite materials. A national consortium of community and technical colleges, universities, business and industry organizations, and government agencies promotes careers and educate candidates for technical employment. SpaceTEC® was established in 2002 as an NSF National Center of Excellence funded in part by a three-year NSF Advanced Technological Education Program grant and renewed in 2005 for an additional four years. SpaceTEC® was awarded a four-year follow-on grant in 2009 as an NSF National Resource Center, and in April, 2013, it received a four-year renewal of its NSF grant. The Center is now expanding operations to Science, technology, engineering, and mathematics (STEM fields) technicians working in technical fields beyond aerospace through its CertTEC® commercial industry credentials.

SpaceTEC® has been accredited by the International Certification Accreditation Council to ISO 17024 standards and offers performance-based examinations that result in industry-driven nationally recognized credentials that reflect the competencies employers demand. Successful candidates can qualify for college credits via transcripts provided by the American Council on Education. The SpaceTEC® national credentialing program has earned a formal Safety Approval by the Federal Aviation Administration's Office of Commercial Space Transportation.
