= International Centre for Contemporary Music =

Music organization

- International Centre for Contemporary Music
- Abbreviation: ICCM
- Formation: September 2021
- Origins: London, Great Britain
- Fields: Music
- artistic and music director: Zvonimir Hačko
- Website: iccmlondon.org

The International Centre for Contemporary Music (abbreviated: ICCM) is a music organisation devoted to the performance, production, and promotion of contemporary classical music, based in London. Its artistic and music director is Croatian/American conductor Zvonimir Hačko. It was launched in September 2021.

== Description ==
ICCM works with internationally recognised ensembles, including English Chamber Orchestra, Royal Philharmonic Orchestra, Sinfonia Varsovia, Philharmonia Orchestra, London Sinfonietta, London Symphony Orchestra, Budapest Symphony Orchestra, Manhattan String Quartet and Hashtag Ensemble.

It commissioned works from contemporary composers, including Wojciech Błażejczyk, Aziza Sadikova, Hanna Kulenty, Avner Dorman, Riccardo Riccardi.

As the official webpage of the organisation puts it, Its ensembles, programmes, recordings and services provide a platform for the sharing of new works and encourage audiences to experience works from the recent past. ICCM’s mission, then, is to be a fulcrum of contemporary symphonic music on the international music scene.
