= James C. Fletcher =

American NASA Administrator (1919–1991)

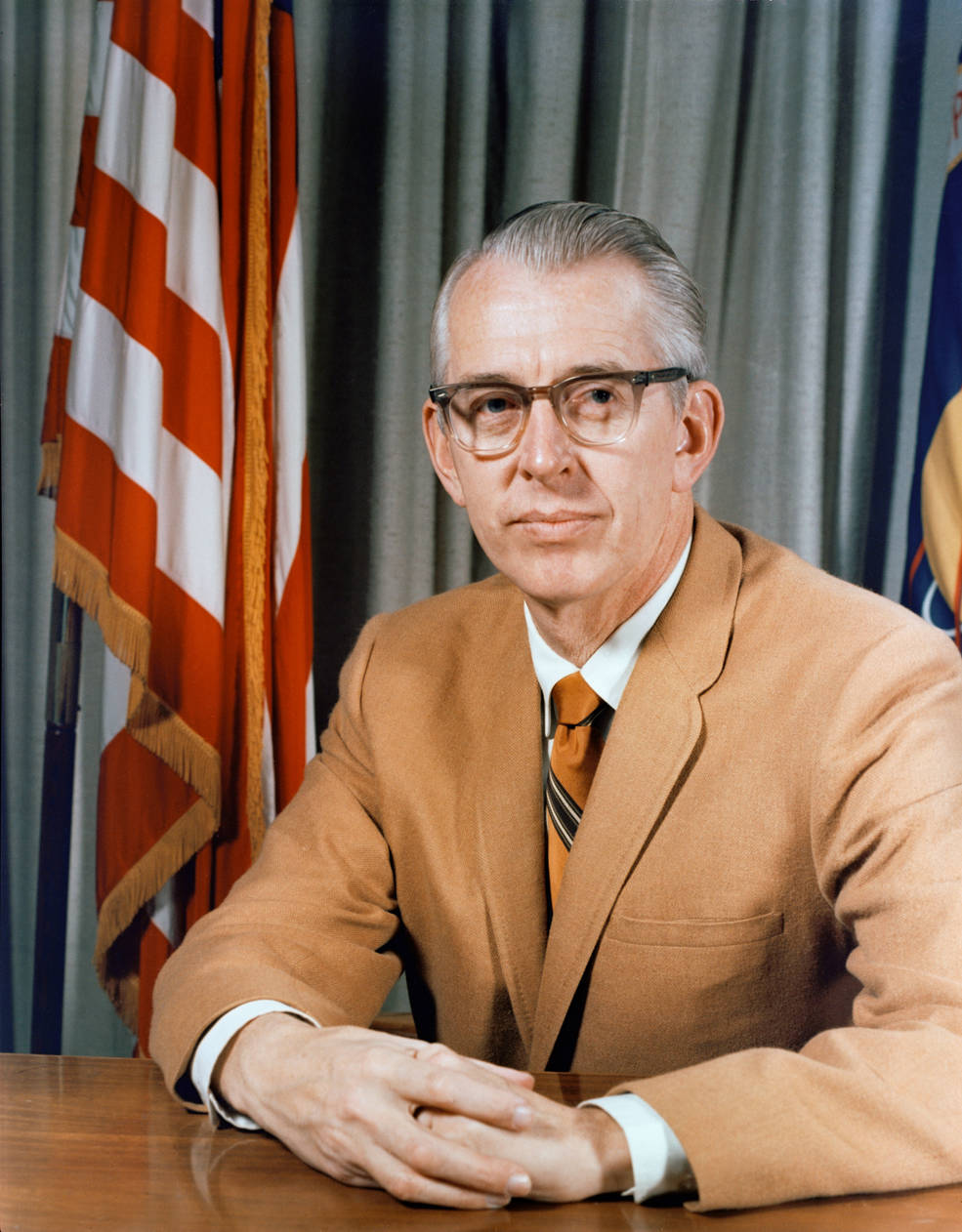

4th and 7th Administrator of the National Aeronautics and Space Administration
- In office May 12, 1986 – April 8, 1989
- President: Ronald Reagan; George H.W Bush
- Preceded by: James M. Beggs
- Succeeded by: Richard H. Truly
- In office April 27, 1971 – May 1, 1977
- President: Richard M. Nixon; Gerald Ford; Jimmy Carter
- Preceded by: Thomas O. Paine
- Succeeded by: Robert A. Frosch

8th President of the University of Utah
- In office 1964–1971
- Preceded by: A. Ray Olpin
- Succeeded by: Alfred C. Emery

Personal details
- Born: June 5, 1919 Millburn, New Jersey, U.S.
- Died: December 22, 1991 (aged 72) Washington, D.C., U.S.
- Resting place: Salt Lake City Cemetery; 40°46′37.92″N 111°51′28.8″W
- Scientific career
- Education: Columbia University; California Institute of Technology
- Fields: Physics
- Workplaces: Harvard University; Princeton University; Hughes Aircraft; Ramo-Wooldridge; Aerojet General
- Thesis: Cloud chamber studies of cosmic rays (1948)
- Doctoral advisor: Carl David Anderson

James Chipman Fletcher (June 5, 1919 – December 22, 1991) served as the 4th and 7th administrator of NASA, first from April 27, 1971, to May 1, 1977, under presidents Richard Nixon, Gerald Ford and Jimmy Carter, and again from May 12, 1986, to April 8, 1989, under presidents Ronald Reagan and George H. W. Bush. As such, he was responsible for Apollo Moon missions 15, 16, and 17, the early planning of the Space Shuttle program, and later for the shuttle program's recovery and return to flight after the Space Shuttle Challenger accident. Prior to this, he was president of the University of Utah from 1964 to 1971.

== Biography ==
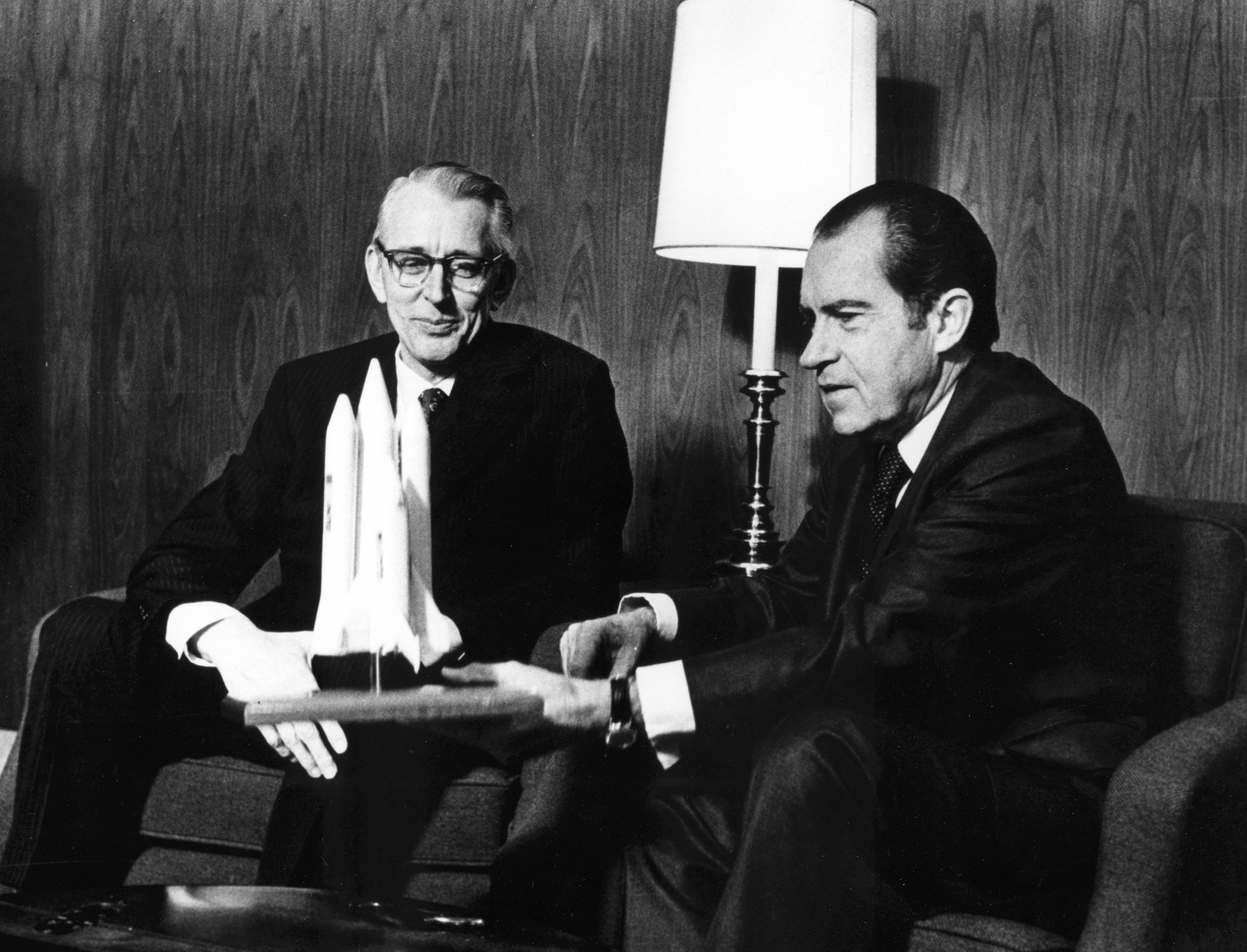
President Nixon (right) with NASA Administrator James C. Fletcher in January 1972

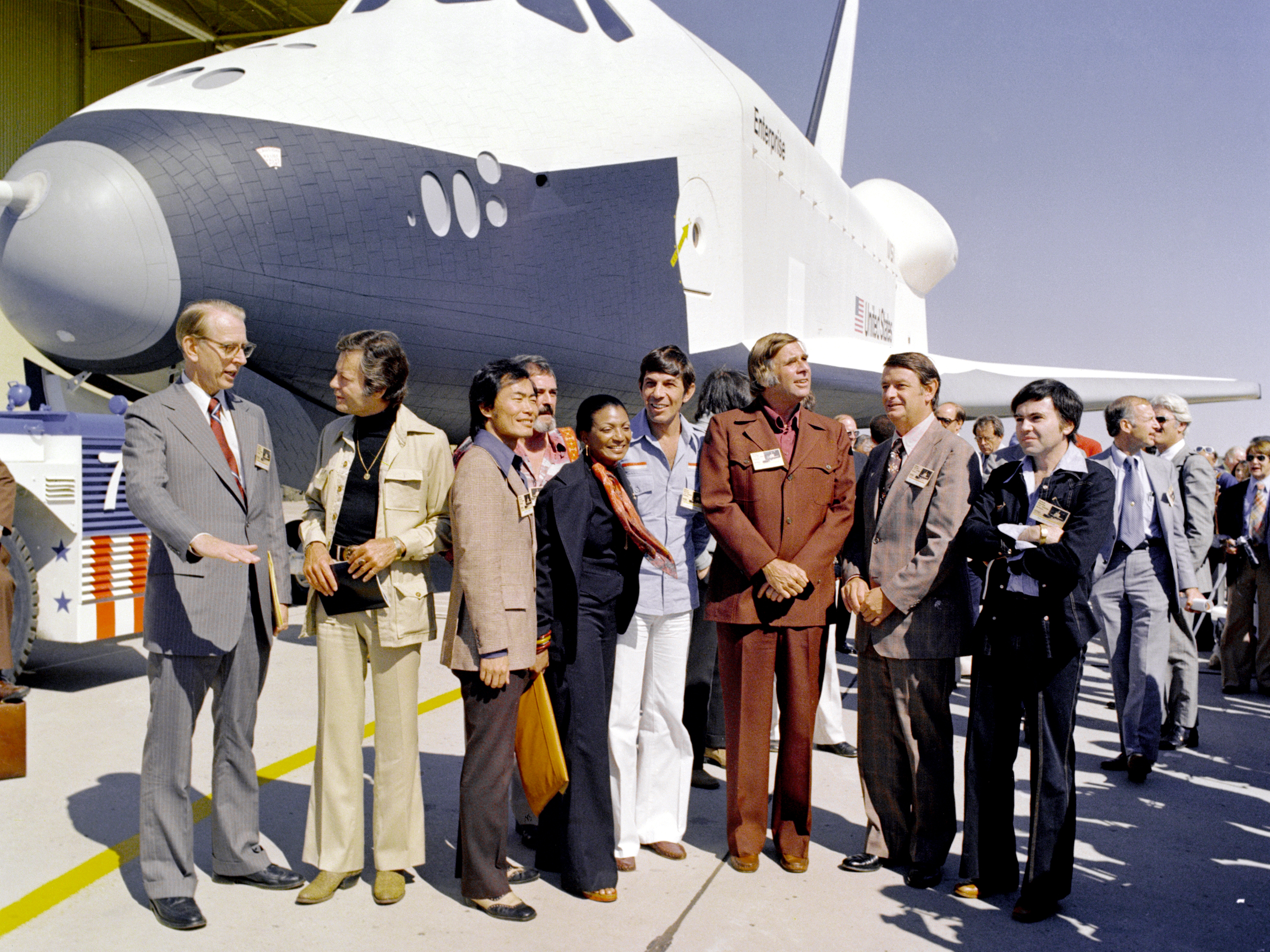
Dr. James Fletcher (left) with the cast of Star Trek in front of the Space Shuttle Enterprise at the Palmdale manufacturing facility

Fletcher was born in Millburn, New Jersey, to Harvey Fletcher and Lorena Chipman. His father, Harvey, is known as the "Father of Stereophonic sound". Fletcher earned a bachelor's degree in physics from Columbia College of Columbia University and a PhD in physics (1948) from the California Institute of Technology. After holding research and teaching positions at Harvard and Princeton Universities, he joined Hughes Aircraft in 1948 and later worked at the Guided Missile Division of the Ramo-Wooldridge Corporation. In 1958, Fletcher co-founded the Space Electronics Corporation in Glendale, California, which, after a merger, became the Space General Corporation. He was later named systems vice president of the Aerojet General Corporation in Sacramento, California. In 1964, he became president of the University of Utah, a position he held until he was named NASA Administrator by President Richard M. Nixon in 1971.

During his first administration at NASA, Fletcher was responsible for beginning the Space Shuttle effort, as well as the Viking program that sent landers to Mars. He oversaw the Skylab missions and approved the Voyager space probes and the Apollo–Soyuz Test Project.

When he left NASA in 1977, Fletcher became an independent consultant in McLean, Virginia, and served on the faculty of the University of Pittsburgh. For nine years, he was active as an advisor to key national leaders involved in planning space policy. Among other activities, he served on an advisory board involved in developing the Strategic Defense Initiative.

In 1986, President Ronald Reagan selected Fletcher to administer NASA for a second time, to help the agency recover from the Space Shuttle Challenger accident. Shuttle flights went into a two-year hiatus while Fletcher ensured that NASA reinvested heavily in the program's safety and reliability, made organizational changes to improve efficiency, and restructured its management system. He oversaw a complete reworking of the components of the Shuttle to enhance its safety, including a redesign of the solid rocket boosters, and added an egress method for the astronauts. The Space Shuttle returned to flight on September 29, 1988. Fletcher also approved the Hubble Space Telescope program. He served as Administrator until April 8, 1989, into the term of Reagan's successor, President George H. W. Bush.

Fletcher lived in McLean, Virginia. He died from lung cancer on December 22, 1991, at Georgetown University Hospital in Washington, D.C., aged 72, and was buried at Salt Lake City Cemetery. He was a member of the Church of Jesus Christ of Latter-day Saints.

In 1974, he received the Golden Plate Award of the American Academy of Achievement. He was posthumously inducted into the International Space Hall of Fame in 1992.

== Sources ==
- Portions of this article are based on public domain text from NASA

Academic offices
Preceded by A. Ray Olpin	President of the University of Utah	Succeeded by Alfred C. Emery
Government offices
Preceded by Thomas O. Paine	Administrator of the National Aeronautics and Space Administration; 1971 – 1977	Succeeded by Robert A. Frosch
Preceded by James M. Beggs	Administrator of the National Aeronautics and Space Administration; 1986 – 1989	Succeeded by Richard H. Truly
