= Industrial Research Institute =

American R&D professional association

Innovation Research Interchange (IRI) is a division of the National Association of Manufacturers, a nonprofit association based in Washington, D. C., United States. IRI was founded as a private non-profit association in 1938 and merged with the NAM in 2022. IRI's mission is "To enhance the innovation leader's and innovation teams' ability to create new value and growth by providing platforms and learning opportunities to share best and next practices, improving team and individual competencies, providing strategic information on the future of innovation execution and leadership, and enhancing and supporting a vibrant community for innovation leadership."

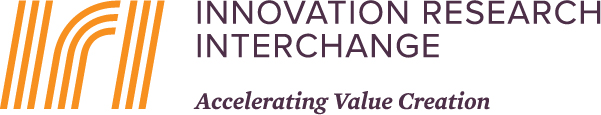
Innovation Research Interchange Logo

== History ==
IRI held its first meeting on February 25, 1938, after the National Research Council established it as a branch within its Division of Engineering and Industrial Research (DEIR). IRI's original membership consisted of fourteen companies; the organization's first president was Maurice Holland, then director of DEIR. On April 17, 1945, IRI separated from the National Research Council and formed a nonprofit, 501(c)(6) organization, incorporated in the State of New York.

=== Original Member Companies ===
- American Optical Company
- Bigelow-Sanford Carpet Company
- Champion Paper and Fibre Company
- Colgate-Palmolive Peet Company
- Collins and Aikman Corporation
- Crane Company
- Fitchburg Paper Company
- Handy and Harman
- Hercules Powder Company
- The Hoover Company
- Jones & Laughlin Steel Corporation
- Procter & Gamble
- Taylor Instruments Company
- Universal Oil Products

== Timeline ==
- 1938, IRI is established as a department within the National Research Council's Division of Engineering and Industrial Research (DEIR).
- 1945, IRI separates from the National Research Council and forms an independent organization.
- 1946, IRI establishes the IRI Medal.
- 1952, IRI hosts a meeting with the Organisation for European Economic Co-operation (OEEC) and the Mutual Security Agency to discuss the management and organization of applied science.
- 1958, The need to publish research findings results in the creation of IRI's journal Research Management.
- 1960, IRI collaborates with the Harvard Graduate School of Business Administration to develop an executive management course called Seminar on Management of Industrial Research and later the Special Industry Training Program, which is offered annually henceforth.
- 1966, The organization assists the OEEC in developing a proposal for the construction of a college in Europe meant to teach scientists how to manage and lead. This eventually leads to the creation of one of IRI's sister organizations, the European Industrial Research and Management Association (EIRMA).
- 1968, After failing to convince the National Science Foundation (NSF) to sponsor the creation of "research-on-research" centers in U.S. universities, the IRI Board appoints a Research-on-Research (ROR) Subcommittee to initiate the work.
- 1971, the ROR Subcommittee evolves into one of IRI's central units: Research-on-Research (ROR) Working Groups, each exploring a specific topic in research and innovation management, with oversight of the diverse groups managed by a central committee.
- 1973, IRI establishes the IRI Achievement Award.
- 1982, IRI establishes the Maurice Holland Award.
- 1984, IRI creates a fellowship program to allow an individual to serve in the Office of Science and Technology Policy (OSTP) at the White House.
- 1985, IRI and its journal begin publishing the results of an annual survey regarding expected expenditure levels among R&D labs. The report is known as the R&D Trends Forecast.
- 1988, Research Management is redesigned and renamed Research-Technology Management as part of the institute's 50th-anniversary celebration.
- 1989, the IRI Board decides to relocate IRI headquarters from New York City to Washington, DC.
- 1994, the Special Industry Training Program at Harvard University is relocated to the Kellogg School of Management at Northwestern University, Chicago, and renamed the Shaping Innovation Leaders Executive Program.
- 1995, the IRI Board changes the constitution of the institute to allow for organizations without a U.S.-based lab to become members, helping to expand membership internationally.
- 2001, RTM begins to be offered online via Ingenta.
- 2003, IRI headquarters is moved from Washington, D.C., to Arlington, VA.
- 2007, IRI celebrates RTM's 50th year of publication.
- 2008, IRI drafts policy speeches on science and technology for both candidates in the presidential election.
- 2012, IRI's journal, RTM, is redesigned and reformatted starting in the January–February 2012 issue.
- 2013, IRI celebrates its 75th anniversary.
- 2018, IRI changes its name to Innovation Research Interchange.

== Governance ==
IRI governance resides in its membership. Each member organization is responsible for choosing a voting representative to vote on its behalf in IRI elections. A simple majority is required for any action to be taken. The membership is led by an elected sixteen-member Board of Directors, with each member serving three years. The board also appoints a president who serves as Chief Staff Administrator and deciding voter should a tie occur.

== Membership ==
To qualify for IRI membership, an organization should have as its primary purpose the creation, production, and marketing of physical or intellectual products or services based on technological innovation. Federal laboratories involved in technological innovation, research, design, or technical support of products and services may also join as Associate Members. The Board of Directors retains the right to offer limited membership to others at its discretion.

Membership includes free attendance to IRI events and a subscription to IRI's official journal, Research-Technology Management (RTM).

== Publications ==
IRI maintains a bimonthly journal, Research-Technology Management (RTM). It publishes peer-reviewed articles covering the full spectrum of technological innovation, from R&D through product development to commercialization. Oversight of the journal is provided by an appointed Board of Editors, led by the Editor-in-Chief. The Managing Editor provide day-to-day management of RTM.

IRI also issues weekly e-newsletters, press releases and other marketing materials on important events, and occasional white papers on a variety of topics.

== Awards ==
- IRI Medal
- IRI Achievement Award
- Maurice Holland Award

== See also ==
- Research-Technology Management (RTM)
