= Research-Technology Management =

- Discipline: Innovation management, Technology management, Research and development
- Language: English
- Edited by: Yat Ming Ooi (since 2023)

Publication details
- History: 1958–Present
- Publisher: Taylor & Francis
- Frequency: Bimonthly
- Impact factor: 3.0 (2024)

Standard abbreviations
- ISO 4: Res.-Technol. Manag.

Indexing
- ISSN: 0895-6308 (print); 1930-0166 (web)

Links
- Journal homepage; LinkedIn

Research-Technology Management (RTM) is an academic journal published by Taylor & Francis. It was previously the journal of the Industrial Research Institute (now called Innovation Research Interchange - IRI) since 1958. It publishes peer-reviewed, research-based articles and managerial pieces written by academics, practitioners and industrial researchers for the innovation and R&D management community. Published bimonthly, the journal is offered electronically to subscribers interested in the management of innovation and R&D.

RTM is led by the Editor-in-Chief, supported by the Associate Editors and an Editorial Review Board. An Advisory Board of imminent scholars and practitioners provides strategic advice.

== History ==
RTM was initially launched as Research Management (RM) in the spring of 1958; Its focus was disseminating information on the techniques of organization, administration, and operation of industrial research. According to Charles Burrill, the first chairman of the Board of Editors for RM, "Why another publication? Because there has been no one place to turn for the latest ideas regarding research management discussions from the research administrator's point of view." RM was published quarterly, in digest format, averaging 64 pages per issue. In 1962, the quarterly schedule was upgraded to a bimonthly publication schedule.

In 1982, IRI began presenting the Maurice Holland Award for the best paper published in RM during the previous year. In 1985, RM began publishing the R&D Trends Forecast, which summarized the data collected during IRI's annual survey of its member companies' spending expectations for the coming year. The article continues to be published in the first issue of RTM each year.

In 1988, Research Management was renamed Research-Technology Management (RTM). RTM retained RM's focus on practitioner-oriented articles. Authors are generally R&D experts from well-known organizations, with some representation of academic researchers.

RTM has been offered electronically since 2001 via Ingenta, with issues as far back as the November–December issue of 1998 available. In 2007, the journal became available on iTunes. In 2011, the journal underwent a redesign; the new layout was unveiled in the January–February 2012 issue.

Past Editors

- 1958–1959, Charles M. Burrill (RM Board of Editors chairman)
- 1960–1961, William H. Lycan (BOE chair)
- 1962–1963, George L. Royer (BOE chair)
- 1964–1965, Robert W. Olson (BOE chair)
- 1966–1967, Robert N. DuPuis (BOE chair)
- 1968–1970, Robert N. DuPuis (Editor, long-term editorial position introduced in 1968)
- 1971–1982, Henry R. Clauser (Editor)
- 1982–2010, Michael F. Wolff (Executive Editor)
- 2010–2023, James A. Euchner (Editor-in-Chief)

== Maurice Holland Award ==
Picture of IRI's Maurice Holland Award.

The Maurice Holland Award is presented each year by the IRI to honor the most outstanding paper published in the previous year's volume of RTM. Named for IRI's founder, the Holland Award is a bronze replica of a "Jenny", the model of airplane Maurice Holland flew during his service in World War I. The award was first presented in 1982 by Maurice Holland's son. The Holland Award is presented to the winning paper's authors at IRI's Member Summit, held each year in the fall. The recipient is determined by RTM's Board of Editors.
