= United States Space Academy =

Proposed US service academy

The United States Space Academy is a proposed American service academy for space-related operations. It was announced on 28 August 2026 by President Donald Trump, and is slated to act as a training academy for NASA, the U.S. Space Force, and the private spaceflight sector. It is planned to be fully operational by 2031.

The proposed Space Academy may be similar in operation to the U.S. Merchant Marine Academy and West Point; however, it will not be a purely military institution, being led by NASA and training civilians in addition to cadets.

== Purpose ==
The proposed academy is planned to not be solely for commissioning officers into the armed services, unlike most other federal service academies. Upon graduation, there will be a multi-year service obligation; however, a majority of outgoing students are projected to join the civilian sector, with a few slots being allocated for Space Force officer contracts.

== Establishment ==
=== Background ===
Space has been highly prioritized by Trump during both of his terms in office. In 2017, he established the Artemis program for a lunar return. In December 2019, he signed into law the bill that established the Space Force as the sixth branch of the U.S. military. Citing "grave threats" to national security, he said the new service would help the U.S. "deter aggression and control the ultimate high ground." On 20 August 2026, he signed a National Security Presidential Memorandum, calling for U.S. ranges to enable "more than 1,000 launches and reentries every year” by 2030.

Trump announced that he would sign the executive order establishing the academy while presenting the Congressional Space Medal of Honor to Artemis II crew members. The mission was part of his administration's plan to return humans to the Moon by 2028.

=== Presidential Commission on the United States Space Academy ===
The Presidential Commission on the United States Space Academy was established on 28 August 2026 by a presidential proclamation. The Presidential Commission on the United States Space Academy, which was established by executive order, will be responsible for the creation of the institution.

Commission leaders and members
Position	Incumbent	Agency	Start	Appointer
Chair
Administrator of the National Aeronautics and Space Administration	Jared Isaacman	National Aeronautics and Space Administration	28 August 2026	Trump
Vice Chairs
Assistant to the President for Science and Technology	Michael Kratsios	Office of Science and Technology Policy	28 August 2026	Trump
Assistant to the President for Economic Policy	Kevin Hassett	National Economic Council	28 August 2026	Trump
Executive Director
Deputy Administrator of the National Aeronautics and Space Administration	Matthew P. Anderson	National Aeronautics and Space Administration	28 August 2026	Trump
Members
United States Secretary of Defense (Note: Secondarily referred to as the Secretary of War. "Secretary of Defense" remains the statutory name.)	Pete Hegseth	Department of Defense (Note: Secondarily referred to as the Department of War. "Department of Defense" remains the statutory name.)	28 August 2026	Trump
Assistant to the President and Chief of Staff	Susie Wiles	White House Office	28 August 2026	Trump
Director of the Office of Management and Budget	Russell Vought	Office of Management and Budget	28 August 2026	Trump
Assistant to the President for National Security Affairs	Marco Rubio	National Security Council	28 August 2026	Trump
Secretary of the Air Force	Troy Meink	Air Force	28 August 2026	Trump

Other commission members may be appointed in the future, although they must be employed by the federal government and chosen by the Chairs.

==== First meeting ====
On 9 September 2026, the Presidential Commission held its first meeting, which was attended by Hegseth, Isaacson, and Meink in addition to others. After the meeting—in which Isaacson remarked that the U.S. was in another space race with China and Russia and that success in such a race would come down to months, and not years—NASA set a short timeline for the project's completion: States were asked to submit their proposals by 26 October that year, groundbreaking was supposed to be done by 2027, a temporary campus for the first class of 300 students was supposed to be set up by 2028, and the academy's permanent location was supposed to be operational by 2031.

== Location ==
According to the initial presidential proclamation, the Presidential Commission on the U.S. Space Academy has the responsibility to specify the process for the selection of the physical location of the academy. Shortly after his announcement, Trump indicated that he would be choosing the location himself. However, of 19 September 2026, no location has been specified for the academy, although it is likely to be situated near existing NASA facilities according to Eric Berger.

On 9 September 2026, NASA, following the Presidential Commission's first meeting, released an RFI in which states were asked to submit their proposals by 26 October. In response to the request, several states including Louisiana, Alabama, Texas, Pennsylvania, and Florida announced that they would apply and compete for the academy's location. Ted Cruz had already expressed his interest in hosting the academy in Texas upon the 28 August announcement.

== Reception and criticism ==
Trump's announcement drew comparisons to the Starfleet Academy—a fictional institution with a somewhat similar objective in the Star Trek series—notably by George Whitesides and Eric Berger.

Brent Ziarnick, writing for RealClearDefense, called Trump's vision for the academy "exactly right" and its timing "fortuitous", since the announcement was made just when the Space Force started building its part-time personnel body. He stated that the U.S. Merchant Marine Academy provided an example of an institution which has been performing a similar mission in the maritime domain, educating both civilian and military professionals. He also said that the academy would make an unprecedented contribution to U.S. human capital by producing a body of space professionals spread out over the country's civilian and military sectors. Recommending that the Space Force should establish something similar to the Navy's Strategic Sealift Officer program, he argued that graduates' experience in civilian space activities would add to their military value.

Wendy Whitman Cobb, in an article in The Conversation, noted that the executive order signed by Trump did not establish a space academy right way and that the academy would be the first nonmilitary one to be run by the government. She also noted several points that the order left open to question, primarily relating to funding and the possible conflation of civilian space exploration with military projects: Trump's comparison of the academy to military service academies contradicted the executive order's description of the installation as NASA-led (NASA is a civilian agency); the academy reignited the debate over the civilian-military distinction in space efforts upheld by U.S. policy since the 1950s; how much of the curriculum to be taught by the academy would be about military applications remained unclear; and the actual establishment of the academy required funding by the Congress, which would make the academy's operation even more difficult because NASA, not being mandatory, is usually prone to budget cuts. Conceding that the establishment of such an academy could prove to be a prudent choice, she recommended a balance between civilian and military intentions to avoid an escalation with U.S. adversaries.

Courtney Albon, in the Air & Space Forces Magazine, also noted that Trump's executive order did not establish the academy outright. Charles Galbreath, director of the Mitchell Institute's Spacepower Advantage Center of Excellence, said that the establishment of a NASA-led space academy made sense given NASA's depth of knowledge and expertise in the domain. He also noted the opportunity to educate people at varying levels of expertise in space activities using programs ranging from certifications to academic degrees and for the military to commission officers. While Todd Harrison, a space policy expert at the American Enterprise Institute, noted that establishing an ROTC-like scholarship program would be more beneficial than establishing a separate academy, Galbreath argued that the co-location coming with the academy would give birth to new ideas and provide better learning opportunities to students. He also said that cost would be an important factor in locating the academy, something which Harrison cautioned would hamper the process of its establishment since the discussion could get stuck in parochial politics. Harrison also noted that the process could face a challenge if the Republicans lost their majority in the November midterms; however, Galbreath said that it would attract bipartisan support, with all disputes eventually coming down to cost—some Democrats, such as George Whitesides, had already stated their interest in the concept.
