= John R. Dailey =

US Marine Corps general

John Revell "Jack" Dailey
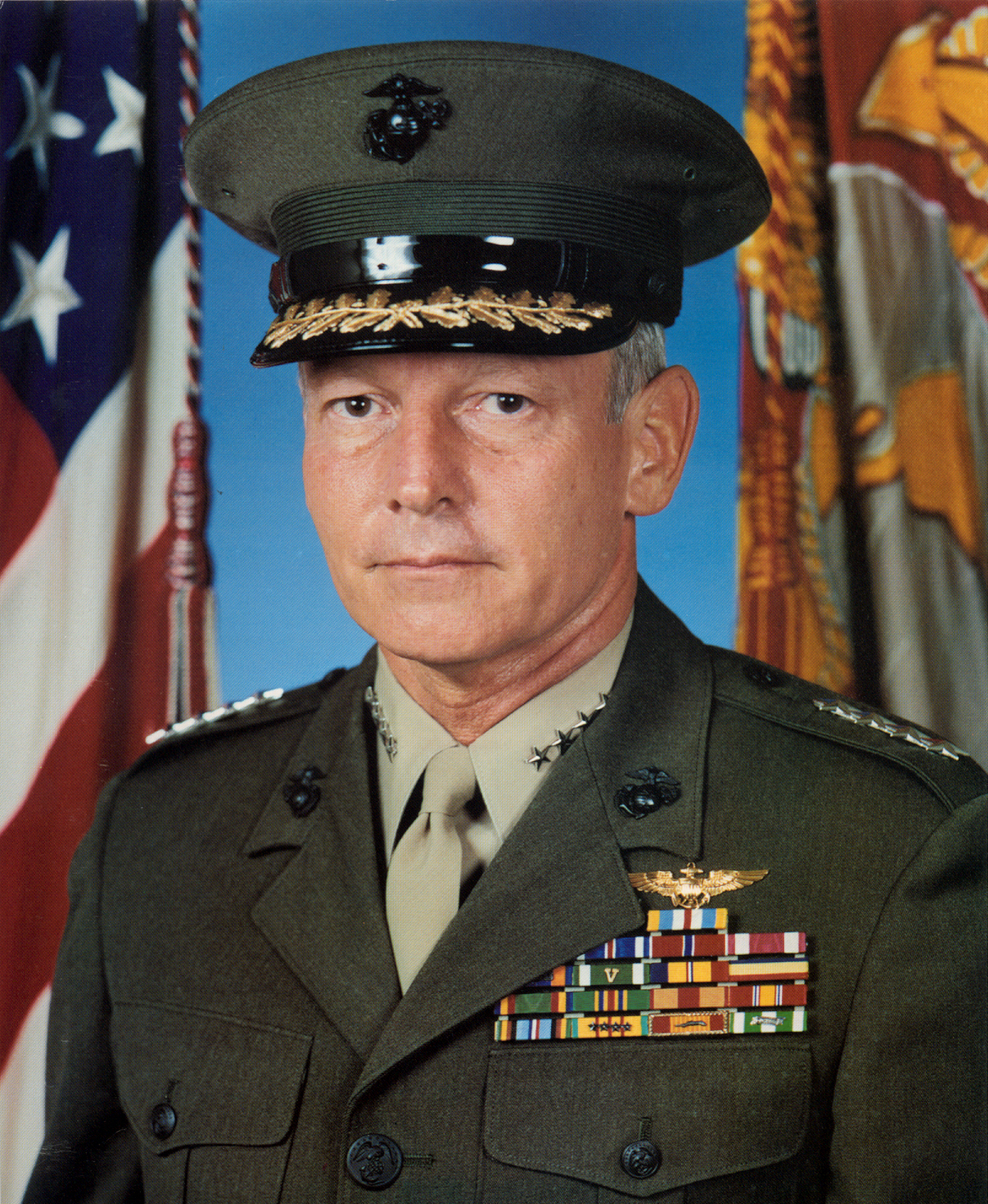
- General John R. Dailey

8th Director of the National Air and Space Museum
- In office January 1, 2000 – April 30, 2018
- Preceded by: Donald D. Engen
- Succeeded by: Ellen Stofan

Acting Deputy Administrator of the National Aeronautics and Space Administration
- In office November 3, 1992 – December 31, 1999
- President: George H. W. Bush; Bill Clinton
- Administrator: Daniel S. Goldin
- Preceded by: Aaron Cohen (acting)
- Succeeded by: Daniel Mulville (acting)

Personal details
- Born: February 17, 1934 (age 92) Quantico, Virginia, U.S.
- Relations: Brig Gen Frank G. Dailey (father)
- Nickname: Call sign "Zorro"

Military service
- Branch/service: United States Marine Corps
- Years of service: 1956-1992
- Rank: General
- Commands: Assistant Commandant of the Marine Corps; Marine Corps Research, Development and Acquisition Command; 2nd Marine Aircraft Wing
- Battles/wars: Vietnam War
- Awards: Distinguished Service Medal (2); Defense Superior Service Medal; Distinguished Flying Cross; Bronze Star

John Revell "Jack" Dailey (born February 17, 1934) is a retired United States Marine Corps four-star general who served as Assistant Commandant of the Marine Corps (ACMC) and Chief of Staff from 1990 to 1992, Acting Associate Deputy Administrator of the National Aeronautics and Space Administration (NASA) from 1992 to 1999; and director of the National Air and Space Museum (NASM) from 2000 to 2018.

His career in the Marine Corps spanned thirty-six years and included a wide variety of operational and staff assignments. He is a pilot with over 7000 hours in fixed and rotary wing aircraft. He has extensive command experience including the Marine Corps Systems Command and the Armed Forces Staff College. He flew 450 missions during two tours in Vietnam and has numerous personal decorations which he received for combat operations.

== Biography ==
John Dailey was born on February 17, 1934, in Quantico, Virginia, as the son of future Brigadier general and Naval aviator, Frank G. Dailey and his wife Flora. He earned a Bachelor of Science degree from the University of California, Los Angeles, in 1956.

=== Marine Corps career ===
Upon graduation from UCLA, Dailey was commissioned a second lieutenant in June 1956. He completed The Basic School prior to flight training and was designated a Naval Aviator in July 1958.

His operational experience includes over 7,500 flying hours in fighters; light attack, reconnaissance, and electronic warfare aircraft; transports; and helicopters.

In 1972, Dailey served as commanding officer of Marine Composite Reconnaissance Squadron-l, and also commanded a carrier task unit supporting combat operations in North Vietnam. During two tours in Vietnam, he flew 450 combat missions. Returning from overseas in May 1973, Dailey was assigned to the Aviation Weapons Requirements Branch, Headquarters Marine Corps, Washington, D.C. In 1975 he entered the National War College and, after graduation, returned to the Aviation Plans and Programs Branch at Headquarters Marine Corps.

In 1978, Dailey took command of Marine Aircraft Group-ll, 3rd Marine Aircraft Wing, Marine Corps Air Station, El Toro. In July 1980, he assumed new duties as chief of staff of 3d Marine Aircraft Wing. He returned to Headquarters Marine Corps in July 1981 and was assigned as head of Aviation Plans, Programs, Budget and Joint Doctrine Branch. After promotion to brigadier general in May 1982, Dailey assumed the position of assistant deputy chief of staff for aviation. In May 1985 he took command of the 1st Marine Amphibious Brigade, Kaneohe Bay, Hawaii.

Dailey was promoted to major general on June 12, 1986, and took command of the 2nd Marine Aircraft Wing, Fleet Marine Force, Atlantic, Marine Corps Air Station Cherry Point, North Carolina. He was assigned duty as the Commandant, Armed Forces Staff College, Norfolk, Virginia, on July 30, 1987. General Dailey assumed command of the Marine Corps Research, Development and Acquisition Command, Washington, D.C., on August 21, 1989, and was appointed to the grade of lieutenant general on November 24, 1989. He was appointed to the grade of general and assumed the post as Assistant Commandant of the Marine Corps on August 1, 1990.

=== Post-Marine Corps career ===
After retirement from the Marine Corps, Dailey served as associate deputy administrator of National Aeronautics and Space Administration from 1992 to 1999. While at NASA, Dailey led the agency reinvention activities initiated by the NASA Administrator, guiding the development of new management processes in the face of a reduced budget environment.

Dailey recently retired as the Director of the National Air and Space Museum.

Since assuming his position in 2000, Dailey has led efforts to expand the size and scope of the museum and increase public outreach. In 2003, in conjunction with the Centennial of Flight, the museum opened a second building, the Steven F. Udvar-Hazy Center in Chantilly, Virginia. More than 300 aircraft and space artifacts are housed in its two hangars: the Boeing Aviation Hangar and James S. McDonnell Space Hangar. In 2011, construction was completed on the center's second and final component, a section devoted to preservation and restoration of the museum's collection.

While at the Smithsonian, he has been awarded the 2011 Lifetime Achievement Award by the University of California at Los Angeles, the Statesman of Aviation Award from the National Aeronautic Association, the Lifetime Achievement Award from the Wings Club, inducted into the Virginia Aviation Hall of Fame and the International Aviation Hall of Fame.

In 2014, Dailey was inducted into the International Air & Space Hall of Fame at the San Diego Air & Space Museum.

In 2018, Dailey was inducted into the National Aviation Hall of Fame in Dayton, Ohio.

== Decorations and awards ==
Dailey's personal decorations include:

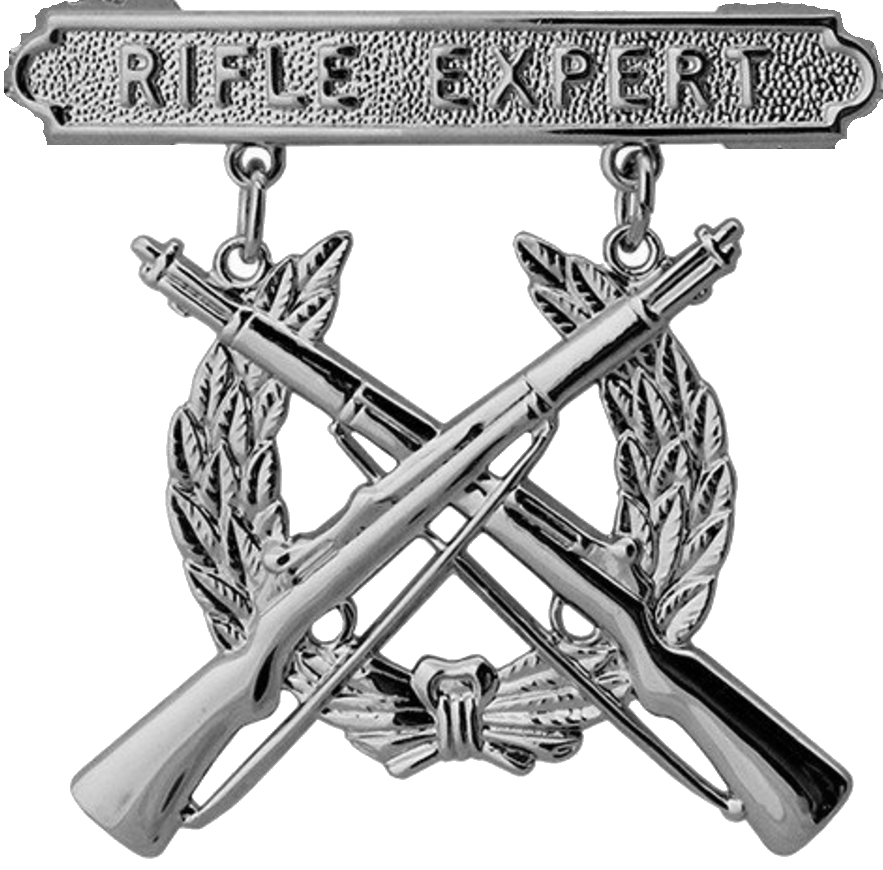

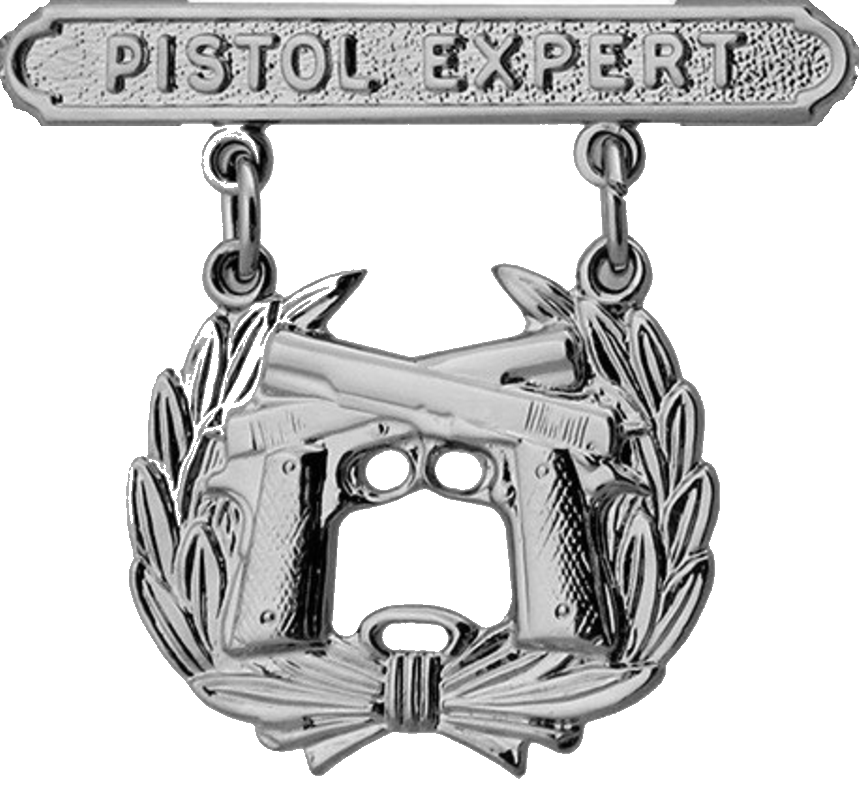

Naval Aviator Badge
1st Row		Navy Distinguished Service Medal	Army Distinguished Service Medal	Defense Superior Service Medal
2nd Row	Distinguished; Flying Cross	Bronze Star	Meritorious; Service Medal	Air Medal w/ 1 award star & Strike/Flight numeral "23"
3rd Row	Navy and Marine Corps; Commendation Medal w/ valor device	Combat; Action Ribbon	Navy Presidential; Unit Citation	Navy Unit; Commendation
4th Row	Navy Meritorious; Unit Commendation	NASA Distinguished; Service Medal	Marine Corps; Expeditionary Medal	National Defense; Service Medal w/ 1 service star
5th Row	Armed Forces; Expeditionary Medal	Vietnam Service; Medal w/ 4 service stars	Vietnam Gallantry; Cross Unit Citation	Vietnam; Campaign Medal
Expert Marksmanship Badge for rifle			Expert Marksmanship Badge for pistol	

- Though Gen. Dailey has been seen in recent photos wearing the NASA Distinguished Service Medal with other mess dress or miniature medals in 3rd order of precedence, according to US Department of Defense regulations, all civilian awards should be worn after military or uniformed service decorations and unit citations
  but before military service medals or foreign awards as shown above.

== Notes ==
Military offices
Preceded by Joseph J. Went	Assistant Commandant of the Marine Corps; 1990-1992	Succeeded by Walter E. Boomer
