= James R. Thompson Jr. =

Deputy Administrator of NASA

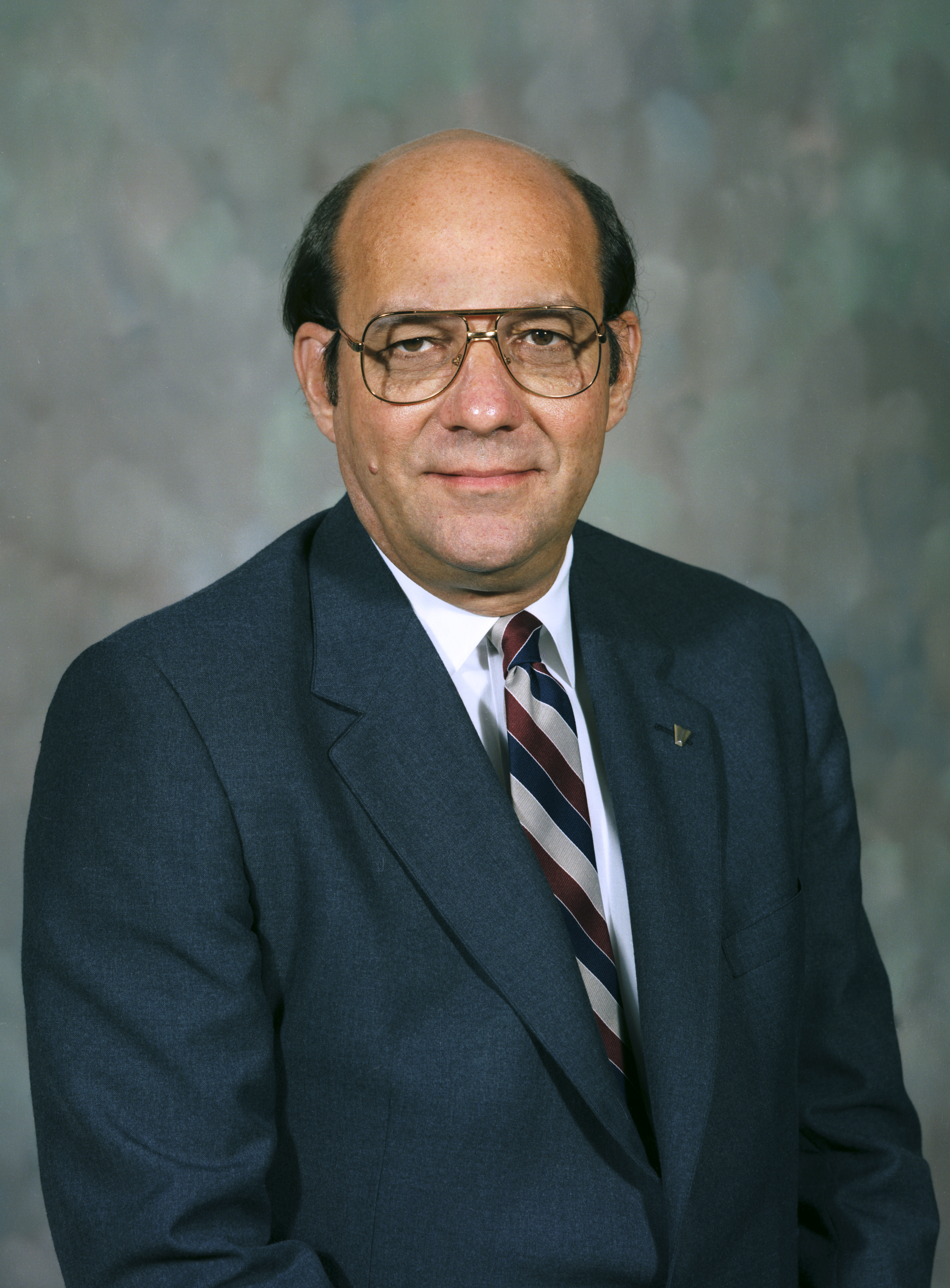
- Official NASA portrait of James R. Thompson Jr.
- Born: March 6, 1936; Greenville, South Carolina, U.S.
- Died: November 7, 2017 (aged 81); Huntsville, Alabama, U.S.
- Education: Bachelor's degree in aeronautical engineering at Georgia Institute of Technology, Master's degree in mechanical engineering at University of Florida, post-graduate work in fluid mechanics at University of Alabama
- Occupations: Director of the Marshall Space Flight Center

James Robert Thompson Jr. (March 6, 1936 – November 7, 2017), known as J. R. Thompson, was the fifth director of the NASA Marshall Space Flight Center located in Huntsville, Alabama. He served as director from September 29, 1986, to July 6, 1989. Thompson also served as NASA's deputy director from July 6, 1989, to November 8, 1991.

== Early life and education ==
Born in Greenville, South Carolina, in 1936, Thompson graduated from Druid Hills High School in Atlanta in 1954. He was awarded a Bachelor of Science degree in aeronautical engineering from the Georgia Institute of Technology in 1958 and a Master of Science degree in mechanical engineering from the University of Florida in 1963. He has completed all course work at the University of Alabama toward a Ph.D. in fluid mechanics.

== Career ==
Thompson served as a lieutenant in the U.S. Navy from 1958 to 1960 and was stationed at Green Cove Springs, Florida, as an administrative officer in the Atlantic Fleet.

He began his professional career in 1960 as a development engineer with Pratt and Whitney Aircraft in West Palm Beach, Florida.

He spent 20 years with NASA at the Marshall Space Flight Center in various positions, including associate director for engineering in the Science and Engineering Directorate and as manager of the Space Shuttle Main Engine Project in the Shuttle Projects Office.

Thompson joined the research and development team at the Marshall Center in 1963 as a liquid propulsion system engineer responsible for component design and performance analysis associated with the J-2 engine system on the Saturn Launch Vehicle. In 1966 he joined the Space Engine Section in the former Propulsion and Vehicle Engineering Laboratory at Marshall and became chief of the section in 1968. In that capacity, he was responsible for the design and test evaluation of auxiliary space engine propulsion systems for the Saturn Launch Vehicle and experimental small interplanetary propulsion systems.

In 1969, Thompson transferred to Marshall's Astronautics Laboratory where he served as chief of the Man/Systems Integration Branch from 1969 to 1974.

In September 1974, he was named manager of the Main Engine Projects Office at the Marshall Space Flight Center. In that position he was responsible for the development and operation of the most advanced liquid propulsion rocket engine ever developed. He served in that position almost from the beginning of early development testing on the Shuttle main engine through the initial Shuttle flights.

In February 1982, Thompson was named associate director for engineering in the Marshall Science and Engineering Directorate. In that position, he was responsible for planning and executing the engineering overview, analysis, evaluation and support for all Marshall Center projects that were in the hardware development stage.

He served three years as deputy director for technical operations at Princeton University's Plasma Physics Laboratory in Princeton, New Jersey.

From March to June 1986, he was vice-chair of the NASA task force inquiring into the cause of the Space Shuttle Challenger accident. In that capacity, he headed the day-to-day operations of the 51-L Data and Design Analysis Task Force, which collected and analyzed accident-related information in support of the Presidential Commission on the Space Shuttle Challenger Accident.

Thompson became director of the Marshall Space Flight Center on September 29, 1986. He became deputy administrator of NASA in 1989.

After retiring from NASA in November 1991, Thompson joined Orbital Sciences Corporation (now Orbital ATK). Thompson - who was not related to David W. Thompson, Orbital co-founder - was executive vice president and chief technical officer of Orbital from 1991 to 1993, executive vice president and general manager of Orbital's Launch Systems Group from 1993 until October 1999, president and chief operating officer of the company from October 1999 to April 2011, and vice chairman of Orbital from April 2002 until his retirement in September 2013.

=== Awards ===
Thompson was awarded the NASA Medal for Exceptional Service in 1973 for his work on Skylab, and NASA Medals for Distinguished Service in 1981 for this work on the Space Shuttle main engine and in 1988 for his work on the 51-L Data and Design Analysis Task Force. President Ronald Reagan conferred on Thompson the rank of Meritorious Senior Government Executive twice, in 1982 and in 1987. He was one of five members of NASA's Return to Flight Team awarded the Dr. Robert H. Goddard Memorial Trophy for 1989.

=== Death and Cygnus Memorial ===
Thompson died in retirement on November 7, 2017, in Huntsville, Alabama.

In 2018, Orbital ATK announced that its Cygnus spacecraft destined for the International Space Station on resupply mission OA-9 would be named the S.S. J.R. Thompson in Thompson's honor. The spacecraft was successfully launched on May 21, 2018, from the Mid-Atlantic Regional Spaceport in Virginia on an Orbital ATK Antares 230 launch vehicle and docked to the International Space Station's Node 1 Nadir Common Berthing Mechanism on May 24, 2018, by the Canadarm2 robotic manipulator.

Government offices
| Preceded by Dale D. Myers | Deputy Administrator of NASA; July 6, 1989 - November 8, 1991 | Succeeded by Aaron Cohen (acting) |
