= Cygnus OA-9E =

Mid-2018 cargo mission to the ISS

OA-9E
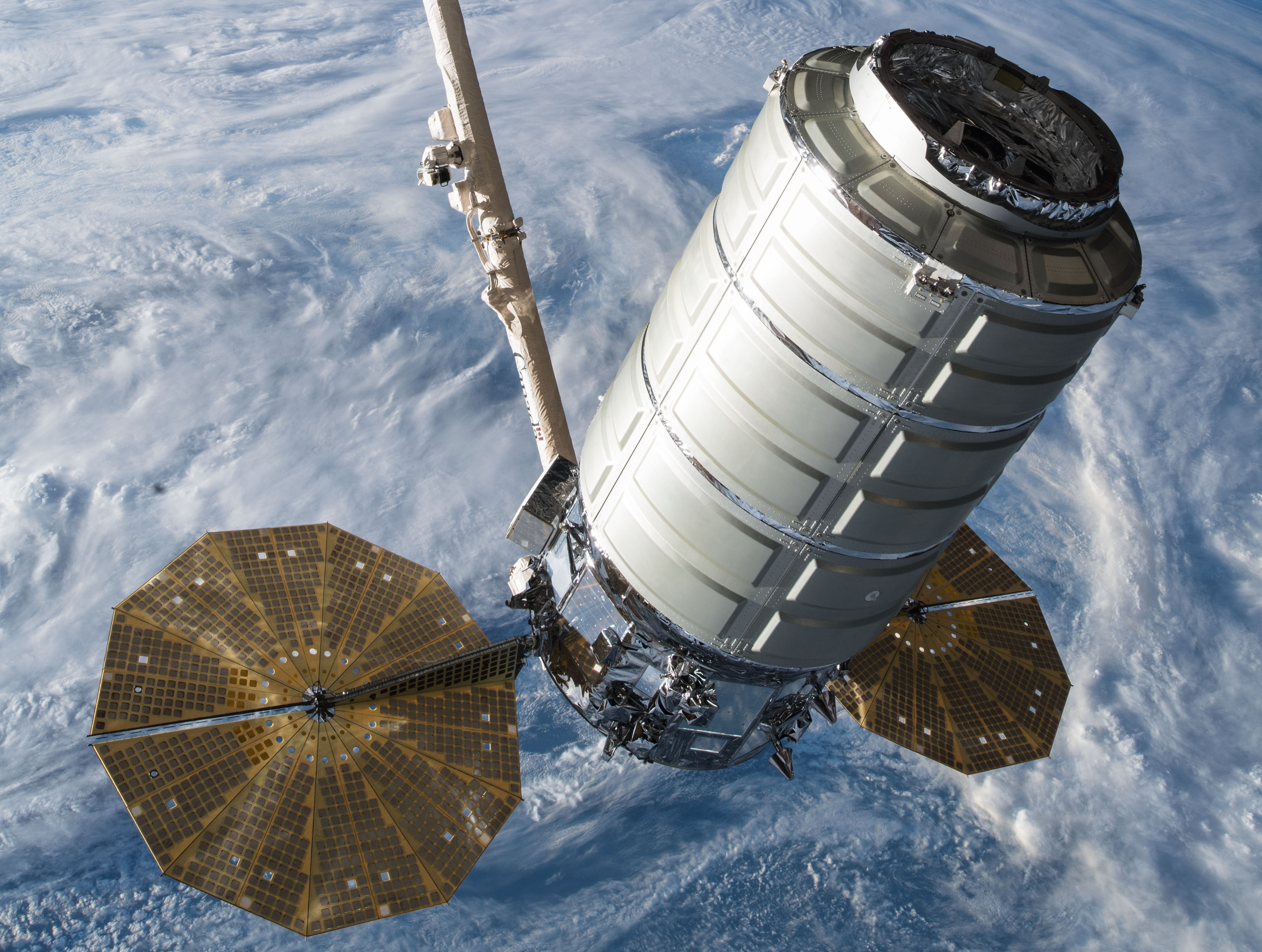
- Canadarm2 grapples the S.S. J.R. Thompson
- Names: CRS OA-9E
- Mission type: ISS resupply
- Operator: Orbital ATK (May–June); Northrop Grumman (June–July)
- COSPAR ID: 2018-046A
- SATCAT no.: 43474
- Mission duration: 70 days, 32 minutes

Spacecraft properties
- Spacecraft: S.S. J.R. Thompson
- Spacecraft type: Enhanced Cygnus
- Manufacturer: Orbital ATK; Thales Alenia Space
- Launch mass: 6,172 kg (13,607 lb)

Start of mission
- Launch date: 21 May 2018, 08:44:06 UTC (4:44:06 am EDT)
- Rocket: Antares 230
- Launch site: MARS, Pad 0A

End of mission
- Disposal: Deorbited
- Decay date: 30 July 2018, 09:17 UTC

Orbital parameters
- Reference system: Geocentric orbit
- Regime: Low Earth orbit
- Inclination: 51.66°

Berthing at ISS
- Berthing port: Unity nadir
- RMS capture: 24 May 2018, 09:26 UTC
- Berthing date: 24 May 2018, 12:13 UTC
- Unberthing date: 15 July 2018, 10:20 UTC
- RMS release: 15 July 2018, 12:37 UTC
- Time berthed: 52 days, 54 minutes

Cargo
- Mass: 3,350 kg (7,390 lb)
- Pressurised: 3,268 kg (7,205 lb)
- Unpressurised: 82 kg (181 lb)
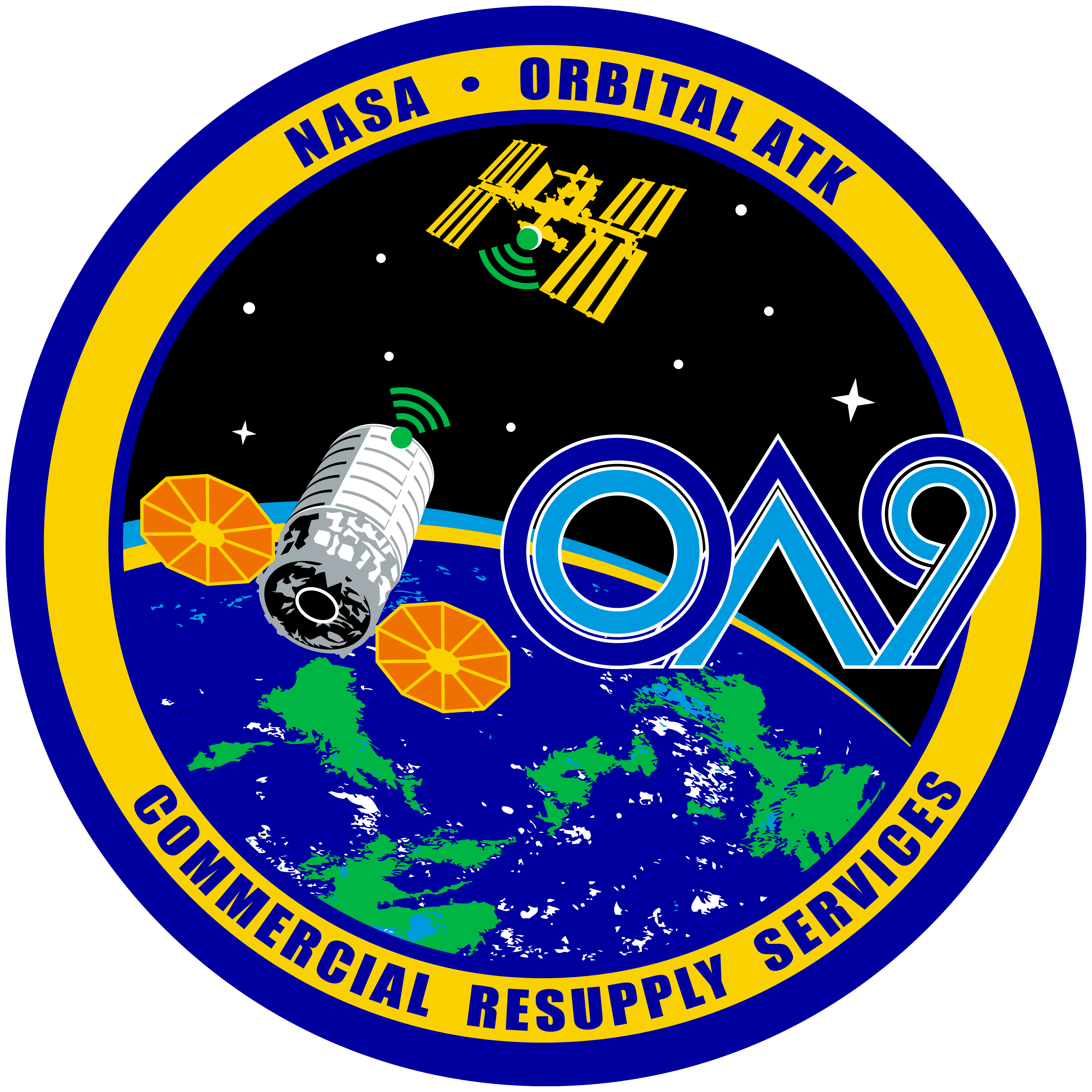
- NASA insignia Commercial Resupply Services Cygnus flights

OA-9E was the tenth flight of the Cygnus, an uncrewed resupply spacecraft. The flight was launched by Orbital ATK (OA), which was purchased by Northrop Grumman during the mission. It was the ninth flight under the Commercial Resupply Services (CRS) contract with NASA and conducted under an extension, leading to the "E" in the mission name. The mission launched on 21 May 2018 at 08:44:06 UTC.

Orbital and NASA jointly developed a new space transportation system to provide commercial cargo resupply services to the International Space Station. Under the Commercial Orbital Transportation Services (COTS) program, then Orbital Sciences designed and built Antares, a medium-class launch vehicle; Cygnus, an advanced maneuvering spacecraft, and a Pressurized Cargo Module which is provided by Orbital's industrial partner Thales Alenia Space.

== History ==
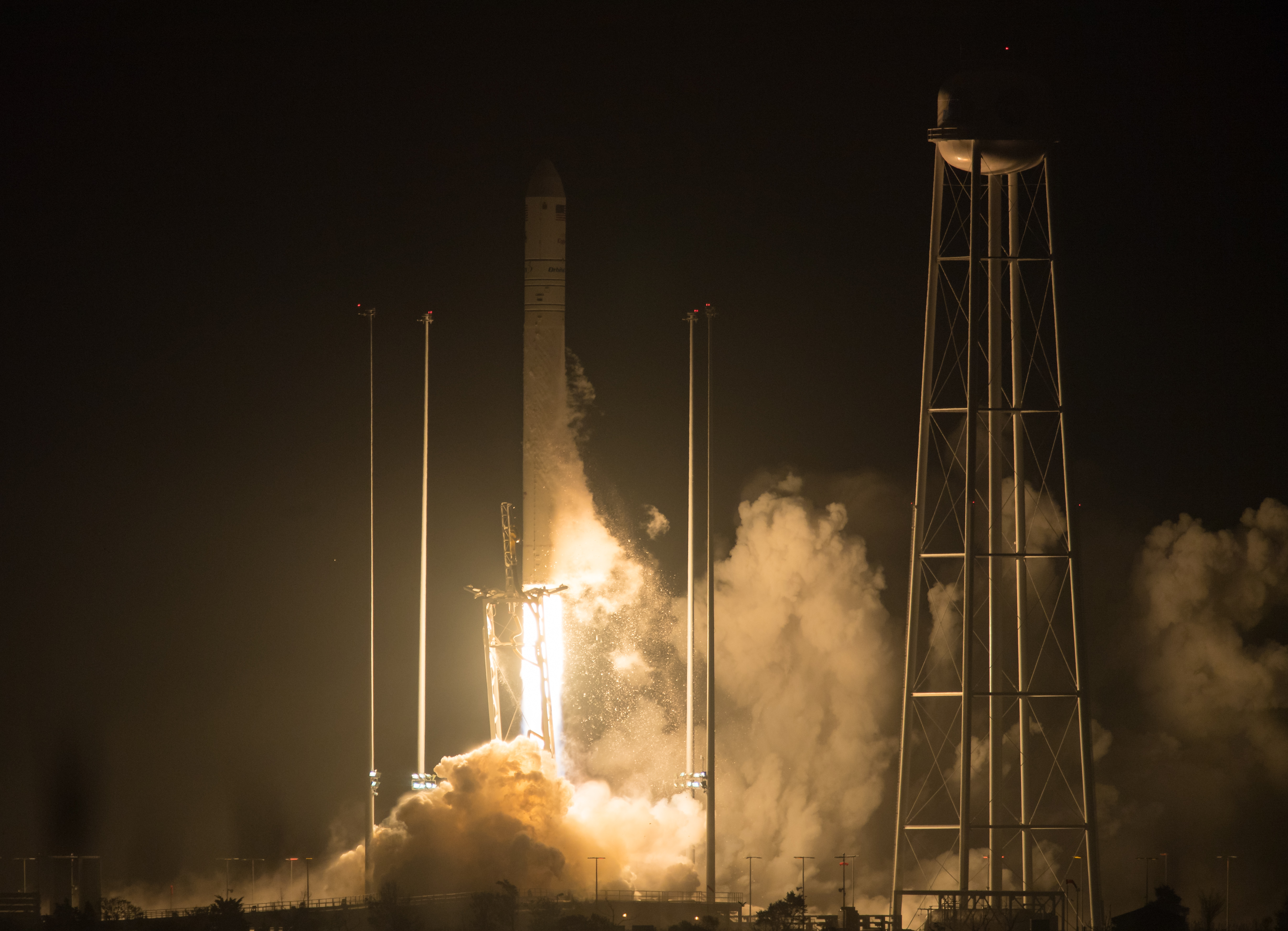
Launch of Antares carrying Cygnus CRS OA-9E.

The COTS demonstration mission was successfully conducted in September 2013, and Orbital commenced operational ISS cargo missions under the Commercial Resupply Service (CRS) program with two missions in 2014. Regrettably, the third operational mission, Orb CRS-3, resulted was not successful due to spectacular Antares failure during launch. The company decided to discontinue the Antares 100 series and accelerate the introduction of a new propulsion. The Antares system will be upgraded with newly built RD-181 first-stage engines to provide greater payload performance and increased reliability.

In the meantime, the company had contracted with United Launch Alliance for an Atlas V launch of CRS OA-4 in late 2015 from Cape Canaveral, Florida, with a second Atlas V Cygnus launch in 2016. The company had planned Cygnus missions for the first (CRS OA-5), second (CRS OA-6) and fourth quarters (CRS OA-7) of 2016. Two of which flew on the new Antares 230 and one on the aforementioned second Atlas V. These three missions enabled Orbital ATK to cover their initial CRS contracted payload obligation. This particular mission, known as CRS OA-9E, is part of an extension program that will enable NASA to cover the ISS resupply needs until the Commercial Resupply Services-2 (CRS-2 contract) enters in effect, and thus the "E" indicates that it actually is an extension above the originally contracted payload transport.

Production and integration of Cygnus spacecraft is performed in Dulles, Virginia. The Cygnus service module is mated with the pressurized cargo module at the launch site, and mission operations are conducted from control centers in Dulles, Virginia and Houston, Texas.

== Spacecraft ==
This is the ninth of ten flights by Orbital ATK under the Commercial Resupply Services contract with NASA, and it is considered an extension over the originally contracted flights. This is the sixth flight of the Enhanced sized Cygnus PCM. The mission launched on 21 May 2018.

In an Orbital ATK tradition, this Cygnus spacecraft was named the S.S. J.R. Thompson after the former president and chief executive officer at Orbital Sciences Corp. who died in 2017. Thompson served in multiple management positions at Orbital, overseeing development of the Antares rocket and other vehicles in the company's launcher family.

== Manifest ==
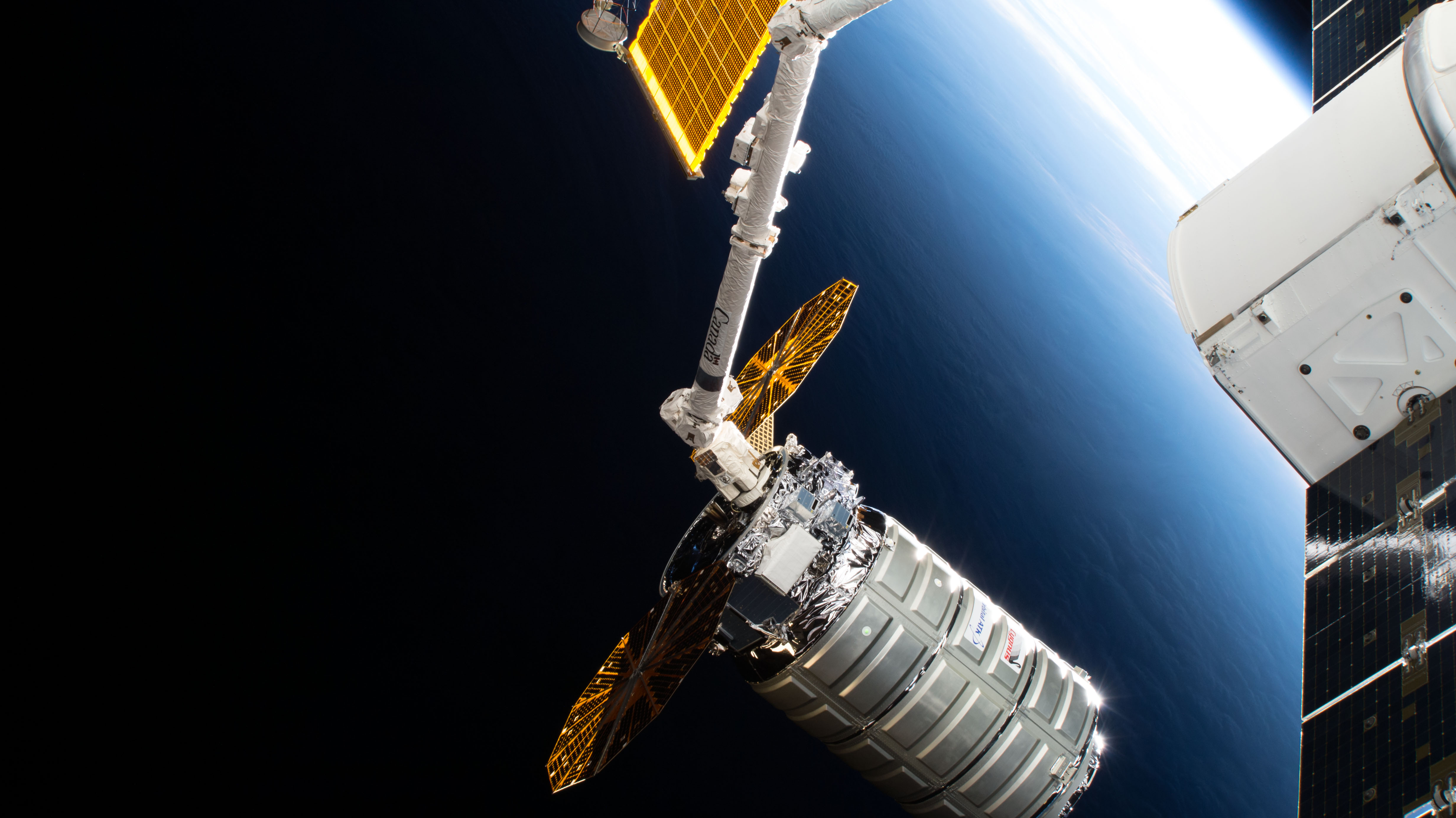
Cygnus CRS OA-9E at the International Space Station

NASA contracted for the CRS OA-9E mission from Orbital ATK and therefore determined the primary payload, date/time of launch, and orbital parameters for the Cygnus space capsule. CRS OA-9E carried a total of 3,350 kg (7,390 lb) of material into orbit. This includes 3,268 kg (7,205 lb) of pressurised cargo with packaging bound for the International Space Station, and 82 kg (181 lb) of unpressurised cargo. The unpressurised cargo consists of a Nanoracks deployer and six CubeSats which will be released after Cygnus unberths from the ISS.

The following is a breakdown of cargo bound for the ISS:

- Crew supplies: 811 kg (1,788 lb)
- Science investigations: 1,021 kg (2,251 lb)
- Spacewalk equipment: 132 kg (291 lb)
- Vehicle hardware: 1,192 kg (2,628 lb)
- Computer resources: 100 kg (220 lb)
- Russian hardware: 13 kg (29 lb)
- Nanoracks CubeSat Deployer: 82 kg (181 lb)

== See also ==
- Uncrewed spaceflights to the International Space Station
