= Nerka Lake =

Lake in the state of Alaska, United States

== History ==
So named in 1910 by U.S. Bureau of Fisheries (USBF) because the lake is a great spawning ground of the red or blueback salmon (Nerka). The Eskimo name of the lake, "Agulukpak," meaning "big aguluk," was obtained in 1898 as "Agouloukpak" from A. Mittendorf, a local trader, by J. E. Spurr and W. S. Post, U.S. Geological Survey (USGS). This is probably the same lake called "Pamiek" by Captain M. D. Tebenkov (1852, map 4), Imperial Russian Navy (IRN).

Nerka Lake
- Location within Alaska
- Location: Dillingham Census Area, Alaska
- Coordinates: 59°33′34″N 159°01′27″W
- Type: lake

Nerka Lake is a lake in Dillingham Census Area, Alaska. In August 2010, a bush plane left from a fishing lodge on the lake and crashed nearby. The crash killed former Senator Ted Stevens and injured former NASA Administrator Sean O'Keefe and his son.

== Climate ==
Climate data for Nerka Lake, Alaska
Month	Jan	Feb	Mar	Apr	May	Jun	Jul	Aug	Sep	Oct	Nov	Dec	Year
Record high °F (°C)	41 (5)	47 (8)	48 (9)	67 (19)	70 (21)	94 (34)	87 (31)	80 (27)	73 (23)	56 (13)	46 (8)	41 (5)	94 (34)
Mean daily maximum °F (°C)	17.0 (−8.3)	17.2 (−8.2)	30.1 (−1.1)	38.7 (3.7)	47.7 (8.7)	61.4 (16.3)	65.6 (18.7)	62.2 (16.8)	54.1 (12.3)	40.6 (4.8)	30.4 (−0.9)	13.8 (−10.1)	39.9 (4.4)
Daily mean °F (°C)	8.1 (−13.3)	6.0 (−14.4)	20.0 (−6.7)	29.0 (−1.7)	39.2 (4.0)	51.0 (10.6)	56.1 (13.4)	54.2 (12.3)	46.4 (8.0)	33.7 (0.9)	24.3 (−4.3)	5.8 (−14.6)	31.2 (−0.5)
Mean daily minimum °F (°C)	−0.8 (−18.2)	−5.3 (−20.7)	9.8 (−12.3)	19.3 (−7.1)	30.6 (−0.8)	40.6 (4.8)	46.5 (8.1)	46.2 (7.9)	38.6 (3.7)	26.8 (−2.9)	18.2 (−7.7)	−2.3 (−19.1)	22.3 (−5.4)
Record low °F (°C)	−49 (−45)	−47 (−44)	−43 (−42)	−19 (−28)	7 (−14)	28 (−2)	33 (1)	29 (−2)	19 (−7)	−1 (−18)	−20 (−29)	−36 (−38)	−49 (−45)
Average precipitation inches (mm)	5.10 (130)	3.87 (98)	3.65 (93)	2.59 (66)	4.71 (120)	4.05 (103)	5.16 (131)	6.98 (177)	7.08 (180)	6.01 (153)	6.13 (156)	2.64 (67)	57.97 (1,474)
Average snowfall inches (cm)	36.3 (92)	41.9 (106)	21.7 (55)	13.3 (34)	1.0 (2.5)	0.0 (0.0)	0.0 (0.0)	0.0 (0.0)	0.1 (0.25)	3.5 (8.9)	23.9 (61)	26.3 (67)	168 (426.65)
Source: WRCC
