= Daniel Mulville =

American engineer (born 1939)

Daniel R. Mulville
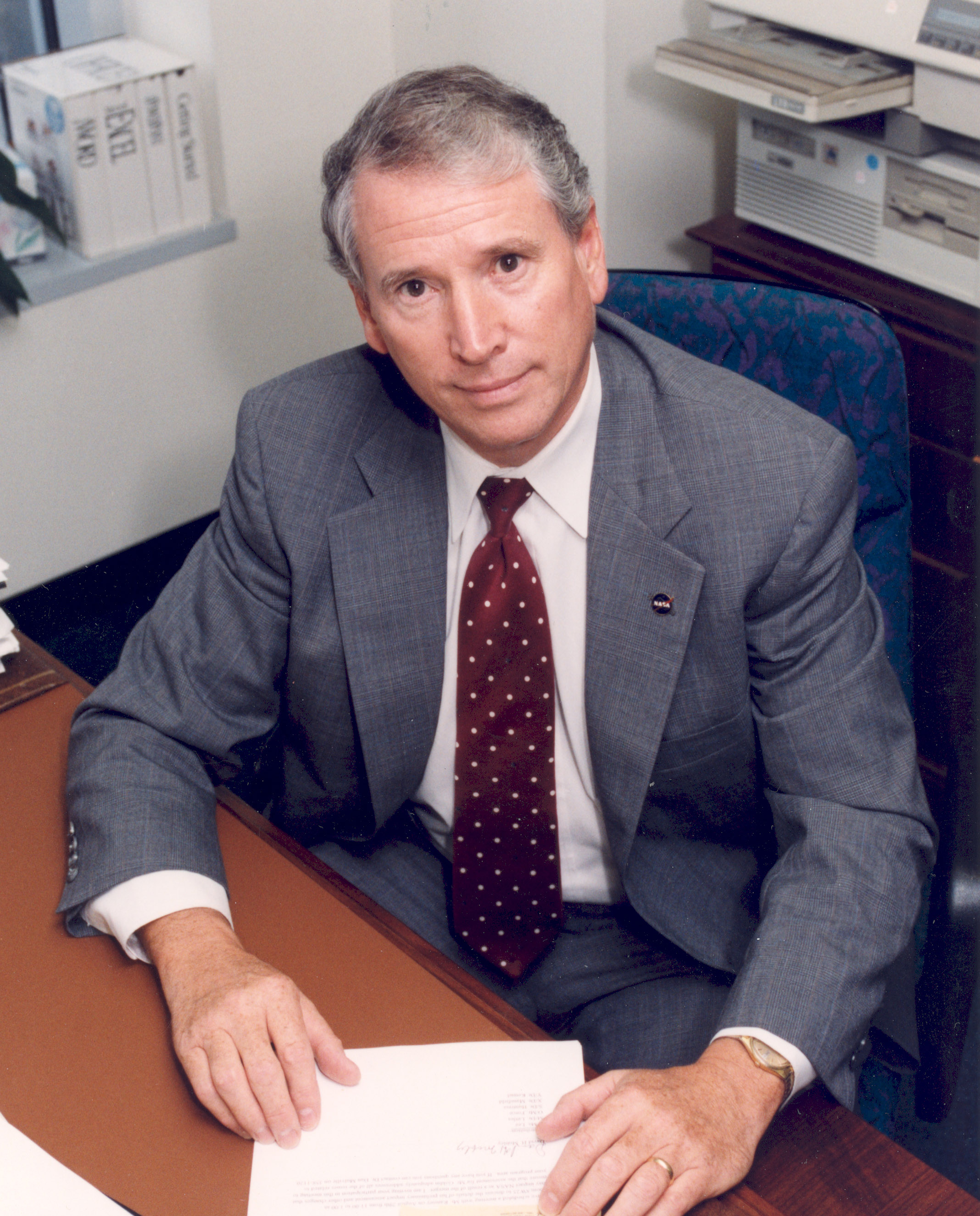

Acting Administrator of the National Aeronautics and Space Administration
- In office November 19, 2001 – December 21, 2001
- President: George W. Bush
- Preceded by: Daniel Goldin
- Succeeded by: Sean O'Keefe

Personal details
- Born: 1939 (age 86–87)
- Scientific career
- Education: George Washington University; Catholic University of America
- Fields: Mechanical engineering
- Workplaces: Naval Air Systems Command; Office of Naval Research; Naval Research Laboratory; NASA
- Thesis: Characteristics of crack propagation at the interface of two dissimilar media (1974)

Daniel R. Mulville (born 1939) is an American engineer who served briefly as acting administrator of NASA in 2001.

== Early life ==
Born in 1939, Mulville received his bachelor's degree in mechanical engineering in 1962, a master's degree in engineering in 1966 from The George Washington University and a Ph.D. in structural mechanics from Catholic University in 1974. He also attended the Industrial College of the Armed Forces in 1986.

== Career ==
=== Early work ===
Mulville served as the Structures Technology Manager at the Naval Air Systems Command from 1979 to 1986. He led the development of structural design, test, and certification methods and was the program manager for development of composites for the AV-8B, F/A-18, and advanced aircraft and missile programs. He served as a program manager for Structures Research at the Office of Naval Research in 1975 and was a mechanical engineer at the Naval Research Laboratory involved in design and analysis of aircraft, missile and ship structures from 1962 to 1979.

=== NASA career ===
From 1986 to 1990, Mulville was Deputy Director of the Materials and Structures Division in the Office of Aeronautics and Space Technology, NASA Headquarters. He managed the Advanced Composite Technology Program, the Control of Flexible Structures Program, and materials and structures elements of the Advanced Launch Systems, Space Exploration Initiative, and High Speed Civil Transport programs. Mulville also directed NASA's participation in the joint NASA/FAA Aging Aircraft Program.

From 1990 to 1994, Mulville was Director of the Engineering and Quality Management Division in the Office of Safety and Mission Assurance, NASA Headquarters. In that position, he was responsible for development of NASA's engineering and quality assurance standards and procedures related to design and development of spacecraft and aeronautics systems.

Mulville served as NASA's Chief Engineer from 1995 to 1999. He was responsible for overall review of the technical readiness and execution of all NASA programs. He provided an integrated focus for Agency-wide engineering policies, standards, and practices. From 1994 to 1995, Mulville was NASA's Deputy Chief Engineer and was responsible for ensuring that development efforts and mission operations of the Agency were conducted on a sound engineering basis.

From January 1, 2000 to February 3, 2003, Mulville was the Associate Deputy Administrator, serving as the Administrator's most senior adviser. He reported directly to the Administrator and was responsible for planning, directing, and managing the daily operations and reinvention activities of the Agency. He served briefly as acting Administrator of NASA, starting on November 19, 2001, as the result of the resignation of Daniel Goldin. As an Associate Deputy Administrator, Mulville was the highest ranking NASA official at the time, due to the vacancy in the office of the Deputy Administrator. He oversaw NASA's daily operations until the new administrator, Sean O'Keefe was confirmed by the United States Senate on December 21, 2001.

Muville retired from NASA after 16 years of service in February 2003.

Mulville has been awarded the NASA Distinguished Service Medal, the NASA Outstanding Leadership Medal, the NASA Exceptional Service Medal, and has received the Meritorious and Distinguished Executive Rank Awards for management and leadership.

Government offices
| Preceded by John R. Dailey (acting) | Deputy Administrator of NASA (acting); January 1, 2000 – August 11, 2002 | Succeeded by Frederick D. Gregory |
| Preceded by Daniel Goldin | Administrator of NASA (acting); November 19, 2001 – December 21, 2001 | Succeeded by Sean O'Keefe |
