= Lori Garver =

Former Deputy Administrator of NASA (born 1961)

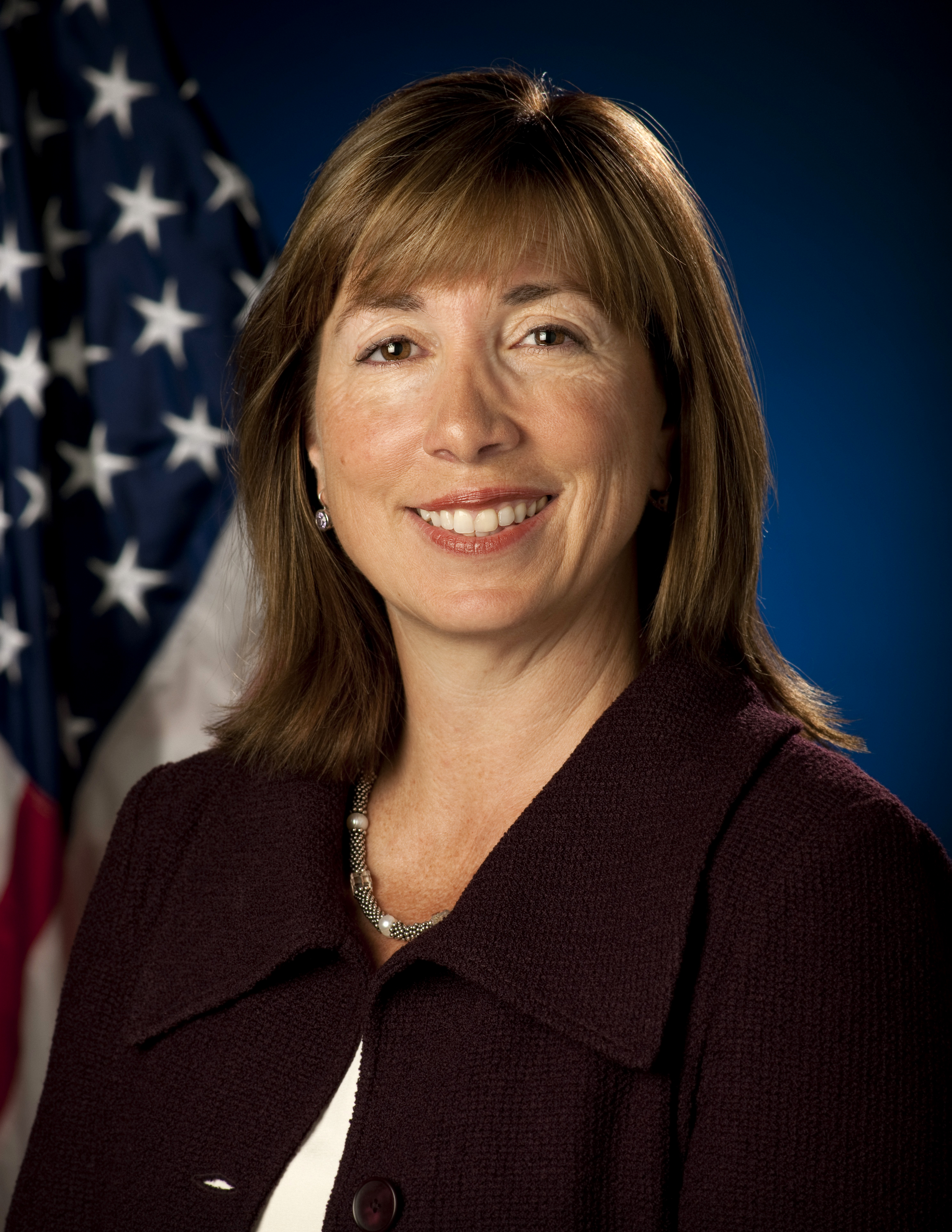

12th Deputy Administrator of the National Aeronautics and Space Administration
- In office July 17, 2009 – September 6, 2013
- President: Barack Obama
- Preceded by: Shana Dale
- Succeeded by: Dava Newman

Personal details
- Born: May 22, 1961 (age 65) Lansing, Michigan, U.S.
- Spouse: David Brandt
- Children: 2
- Education: Colorado College (BA); George Washington University (MA)

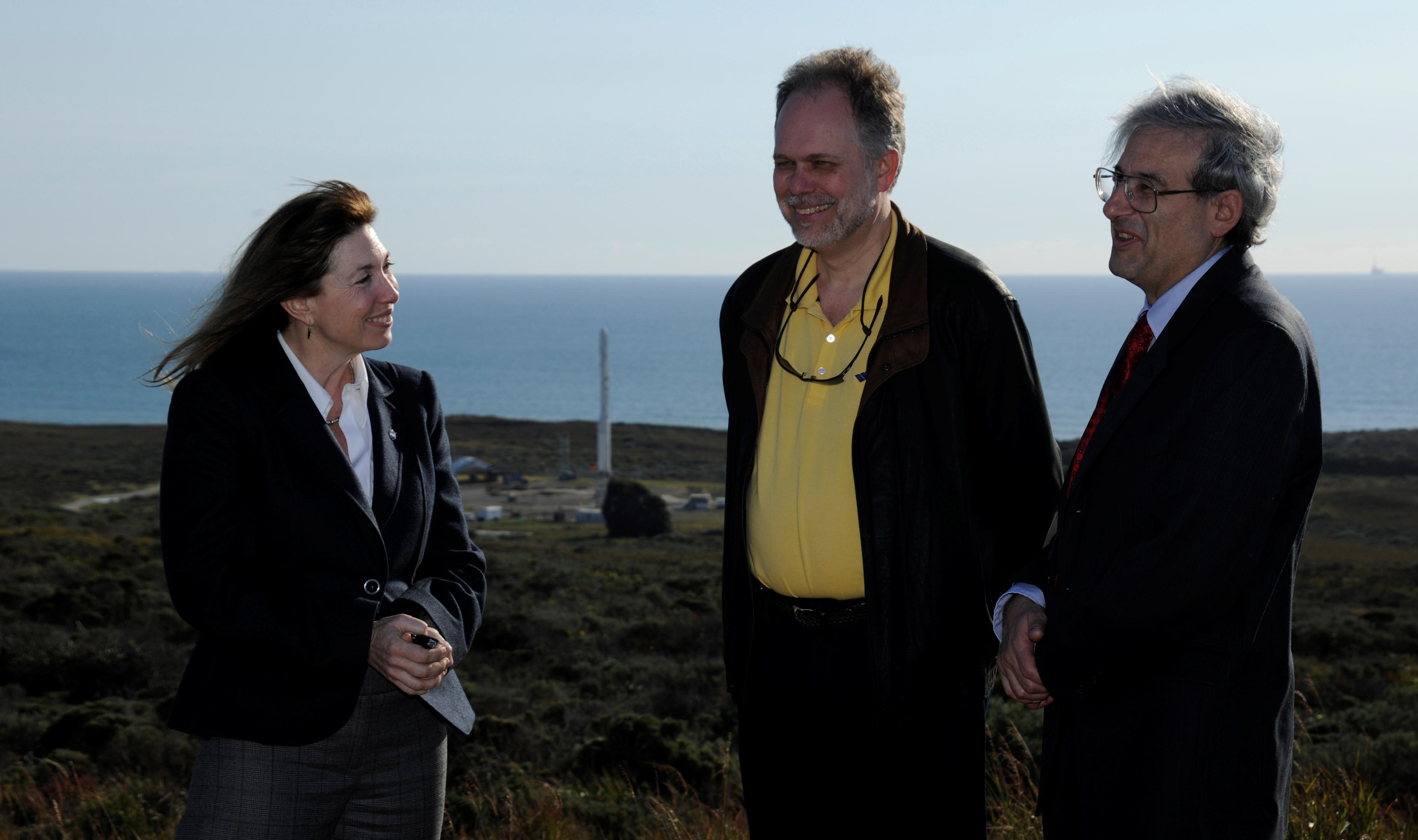
A few hours before the launch of NASA's Glory research satellite, Garver visited the mission's launch site.

Lori Beth Garver (born May 22, 1961, in Lansing, Michigan) is a former Deputy Administrator of the National Aeronautics and Space Administration (NASA). She was nominated on May 24, 2009, by President Barack Obama, along with Charles Bolden as NASA Administrator. She was confirmed by the United States Senate by unanimous consent on July 15, 2009. She left the position in September 2013 to become General Manager of the Air Line Pilots Association.

Garver was the lead civil space policy advisor for Obama's 2008 presidential campaign and led the agency review team for NASA during the post-election transition. She worked at NASA from 1996–2001, first as a special assistant to the NASA administrator and senior policy analyst for the Office of Policy and Plans, and then as the Associate Administrator for the Office of Policy and Plans.

== Early life and education ==
Garver was born in Lansing, Michigan on May 22, 1961, and she graduated from Haslett High School in Haslett, Michigan in 1979. In 1983, she earned a Bachelor of Arts degree in political science and economics from Colorado College. While working for Senator John Glenn from 1983–1984 she became interested in space, and went on to earn a Master of Arts degree in science, technology and public policy from the George Washington University in 1989.

== Career ==
During her career, Garver worked in the nonprofit, government, and commercial sectors. Garver has held advocacy roles for space exploration as a member of the NASA Advisory Council, a guest lecturer at the International Space University, president and board member of Women in Aerospace, and president of the American Astronautical Society. She was awarded both the NASA Distinguished Public Service Medal, and the NASA Distinguished Service Medal.

Garver served as the second Executive Director of the National Space Society, a non-profit space organization based in Washington, D.C. for nine years, leaving the organization in 1998. From 1998–2001, she served as the Associate Administrator of the Office of Policy and Plans for the National Aeronautics and Space Administration. Reporting directly to the NASA Administrator, she managed the analysis, development, and integration of NASA policies and long-range plans, the NASA Strategic Management System, the NASA Advisory Council, and the History Division. Prior to this appointment, Garver served as a Senior Policy Analyst for the Office of Policy and Plans, and Special Assistant to the Administrator.

In 2001–2002, Garver initiated a project to increase the visibility and viability of commercial spaceflight. While providing support to a client who was paying for a trip to space, she attempted to secure her own sponsored space flight, as "the first Soccer Mom" aboard the Russian Soyuz vehicle to the International Space Station. She worked to secure sponsorship funding as she began the initial medical certification and training in Star City, Russia. The effort ended because of a conflicting bid from another prospective space tourist.

Garver was the President of Capital Space, LLC, and served as a Senior Advisor for Space at the Avascent Group, based in Washington, D.C. She served as Vice President of DFI Corporate Services (the predecessor organization to the Avascent Group) from 2001–2003. In these roles, Garver provided strategic planning, technology feasibility research and business development assistance. She also gave merger, acquisition, and strategic alliance support to financial institutions and Fortune 500 companies in many industries.

Garver served as a lead space policy advisor for the Barack Obama, Hillary Clinton and John Kerry campaigns for president. In November 2008, she was named to lead the Obama Presidential Transition Agency Review Team for NASA.

In 2016 Garver founded the Brooke Owens Fellowship, which offers paid summer internships to college undergraduate women planning to pursue aviation or space careers. Garver received the Women in Aerospace (WIA) 2020 Lifetime Achievement Award in December 2020 for her contributions to the aerospace industry laying the groundwork for the Commercial Crew Program, founding the Brooke Owens Fellowship, and her current position as CEO of Earthrise Alliance.

== NASA career ==
Garver's confirmation as deputy administrator marks the second time she has worked for NASA. Her first period of service to the agency was from 1996 to 2001. She first served as a special assistant to the NASA administrator and senior policy analyst for the Office of Policy and Plans, before becoming the associate administrator for the Office of Policy and Plans. Reporting to the NASA administrator, she oversaw the analysis, development and integration of policies and long-range plans, the NASA Strategic Management System, and the NASA Advisory Council.

In June 2010, she addressed the United Nations Committee on the Peaceful Uses of Outer Space, and signed an earth science satellite agreement. She has participated in several NASA launch Tweetups. In May 2011, she joined NASA scientists to participate in a field campaign studying how dust affects the snow cover in the Colorado River Basin. The team visited dust emission sites in the deserts of Utah and then snowpits in the Colorado mountains to learn how dust layers might help predict snow melt.

== Writing ==
In 2022, Garver published a book entitled Escaping Gravity: My Quest to Transform NASA and Launch a New Space Age. In the book, Garver focuses on the agency's attempts to launch commercial cargo and crew capabilities to the International Space Station.

Government offices
Preceded by Shana Dale	Deputy Administrator of NASA; July 15, 2009 – September 6, 2013	Succeeded by Dava J. Newman
