= Matthew P. Anderson =

United States Air Force colonel

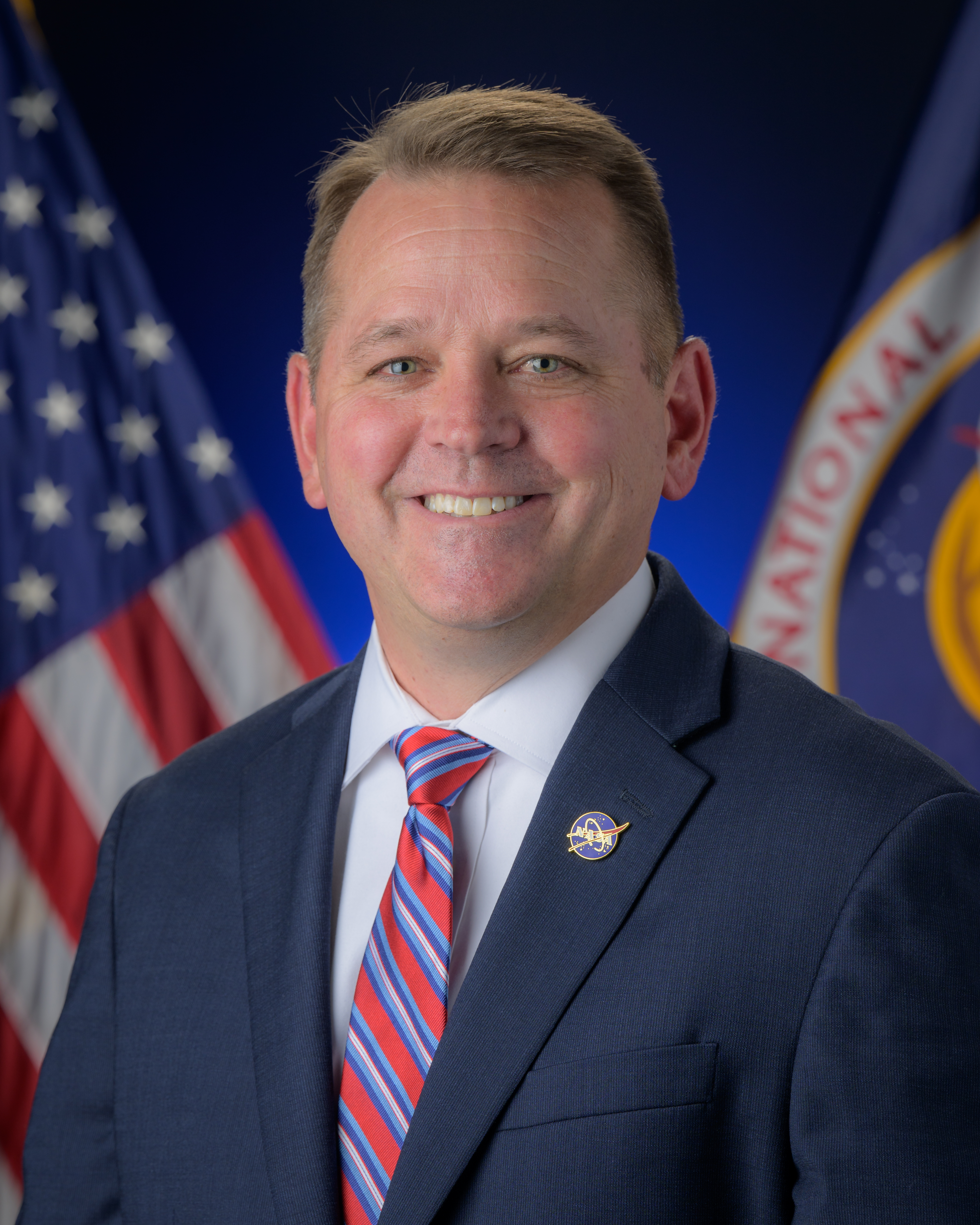
- Official portrait, 2026

16th Deputy Administrator of the National Aeronautics and Space Administration
- Incumbent
- Assumed office May 21, 2026
- President: Donald Trump
- Preceded by: Pamela Melroy

Personal details
- Born: Colorado Springs, Colorado, U.S.
- Spouse: Christine Anderson
- Children: 2
- Education: United States Air Force Academy (BS); Embry-Riddle Aeronautical University (MS); University of Colorado Colorado Springs (MA)
- Military career
- Allegiance: United States
- Branch: United States Air Force
- Service years: 1997–2021
- Rank: Colonel

Matthew P. Anderson is an American aerospace executive and retired United States Air Force colonel who has served as the 16th deputy administrator of NASA since May 2026. He previously served as the Chief Growth Officer of the Space Force Association.

== Early life and education ==
Anderson graduated from the United States Air Force Academy with a Bachelor of Science degree in biology. He later earned a Master of Science in Aeronautical Science from Embry-Riddle Aeronautical University and a Master of Arts in Leadership and Counseling from the University of Colorado Colorado Springs.

== Military career ==
Anderson served in the U.S. Air Force for over 24 years, retiring as a colonel in October 2021. A trained pilot and instructor, he held various roles, including Senior Aide-de-Camp to the Commander of North American Aerospace Defense Command (NORAD) and United States Northern Command from 2011 to 2013. His final assignment was as the senior liaison officer to United States Space Command, NORAD, and United States Northern Command for the United States Transportation Command from 2018 to 2021.

== Post-military career ==
After retiring from the Air Force, Anderson joined CACI International as Vice President and Client Executive for the U.S. Space Force and Air Force, focusing on professional services and information technology contracts for the United States Department of Defense and other federal agencies. He also became involved with the Space Force Association, a nonprofit organization advocating for the United States Space Force, serving as Director of Outreach, Chief Operating Officer, and later Chief Growth Officer.

In 2024, Anderson was recognized by Washington Exec as one of the "Top Space Execs to Watch" for his contributions to the aerospace industry. He has been an advocate for commercial space initiatives and has publicly supported the nomination of Jared Isaacman as NASA administrator, notably interviewing Isaacman at the Space Force Association's Spacepower Conference in December 2024.

== NASA Deputy Administrator ==
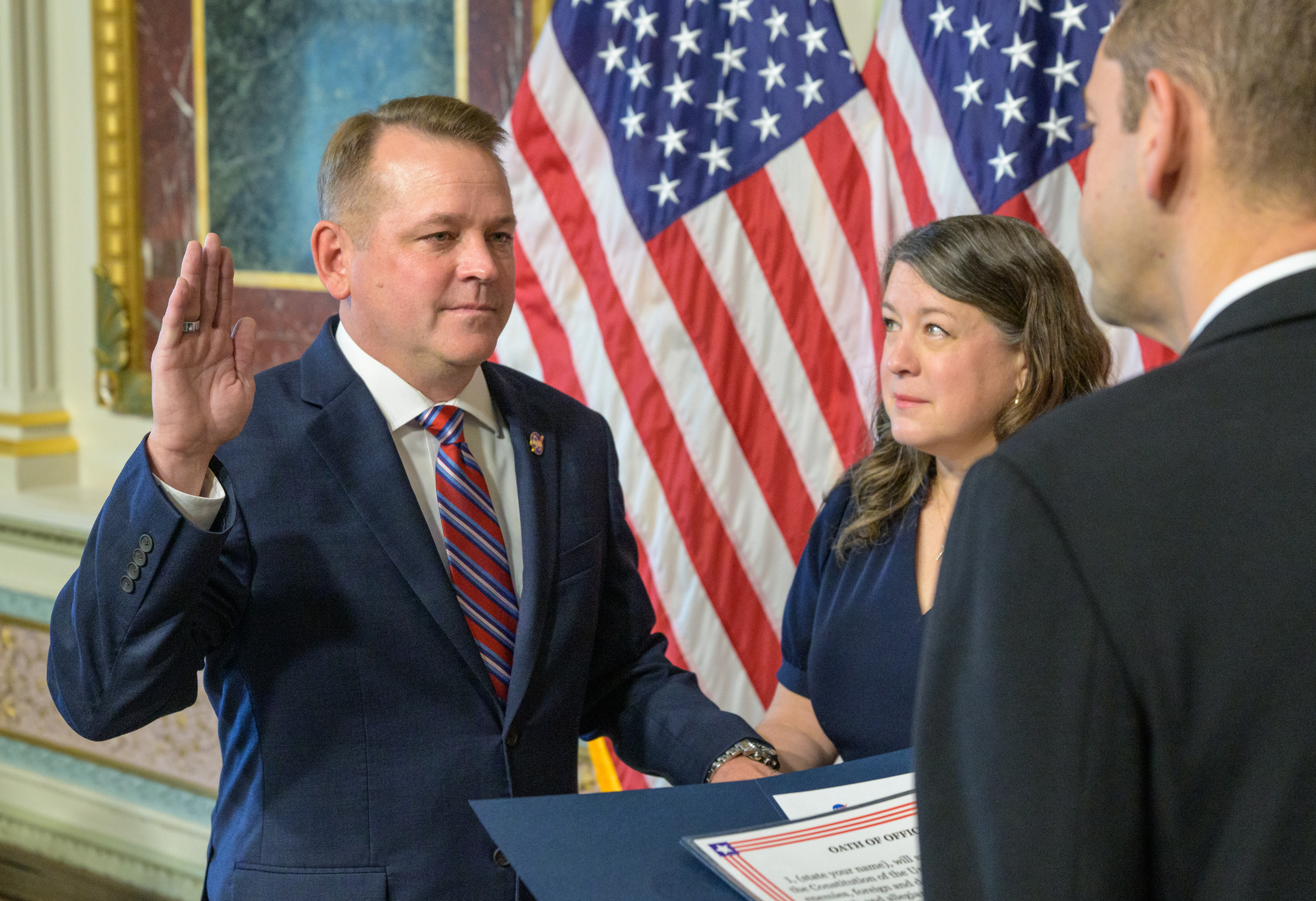
Anderson, left, joined by his wife Christine, is sworn in as Deputy Administrator

=== First nomination ===
On May 6, 2025, President Donald Trump nominated Anderson to serve as the deputy administrator of NASA, the second-highest-ranking position in the agency, assisting the NASA administrator in leading the organization. The nomination was formally transmitted to the Senate with a confirmation hearing pending before the Senate Committee on Commerce, Science, and Transportation. Acting NASA administrator Janet Petro praised Anderson's nomination, citing his "extensive knowledge of space operations, aeronautics expertise, and industry experience" as assets for NASA's mission.

Anderson's nomination was noted for its focus on external partnerships, given his limited prior direct engagement with NASA compared to predecessors like Pamela Melroy. His background in national security space and industry has sparked discussion within the space community about his potential to complement Jared Isaacman, the nominee for NASA administrator, who also has limited NASA experience.

=== Second nomination ===
He was renominated on January 13, 2026, confirmed on May 18, and sworn in on May 21.
