= Pamela Melroy =

American astronaut and USAF officer (born 1961)

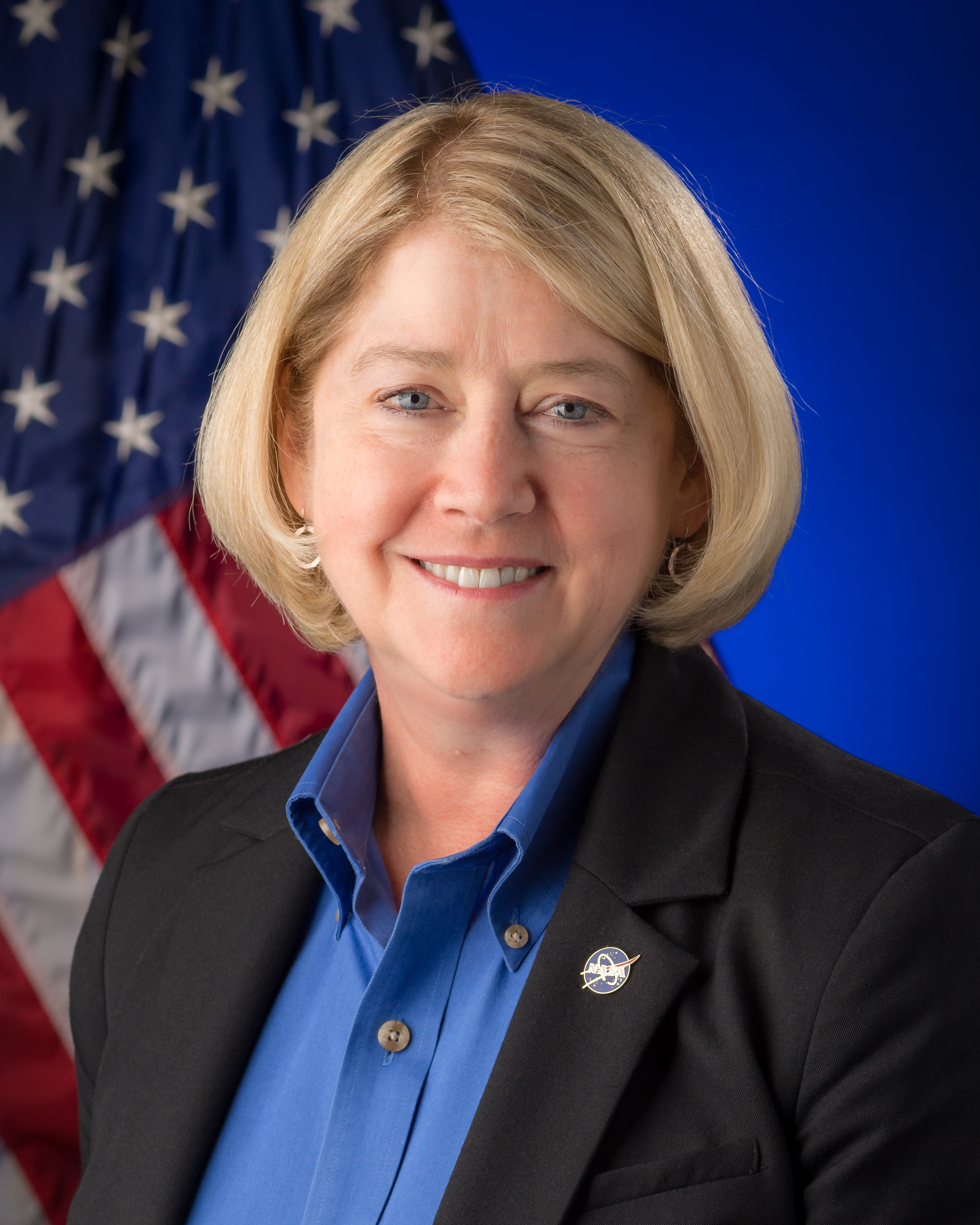
- Official portrait, 2023

15th Deputy Administrator of the National Aeronautics and Space Administration
- In office June 21, 2021 – January 20, 2025
- President: Joe Biden
- Preceded by: James Morhard
- Succeeded by: Matthew P. Anderson

Personal details
- Born: Pamela Ann Melroy; September 17, 1961 (age 65) Palo Alto, California, U.S.
- Education: Wellesley College (BA); Massachusetts Institute of Technology (MS)
- Space career

NASA astronaut
- Rank: Colonel, USAF
- Time in space: 38d 20h 6m
- Selection: NASA Group 15 (1994)
- Missions: STS-92; STS-112; STS-120
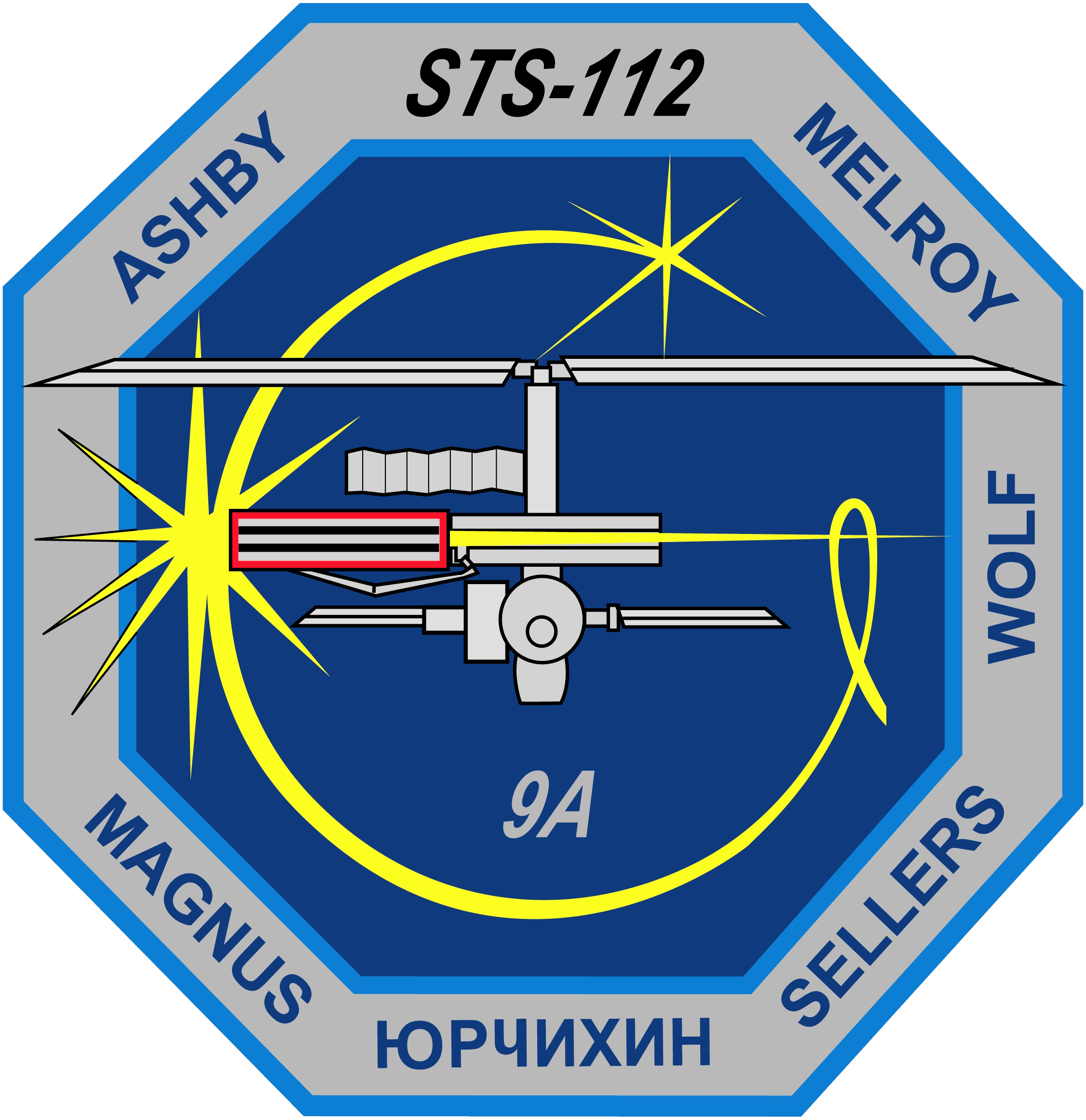
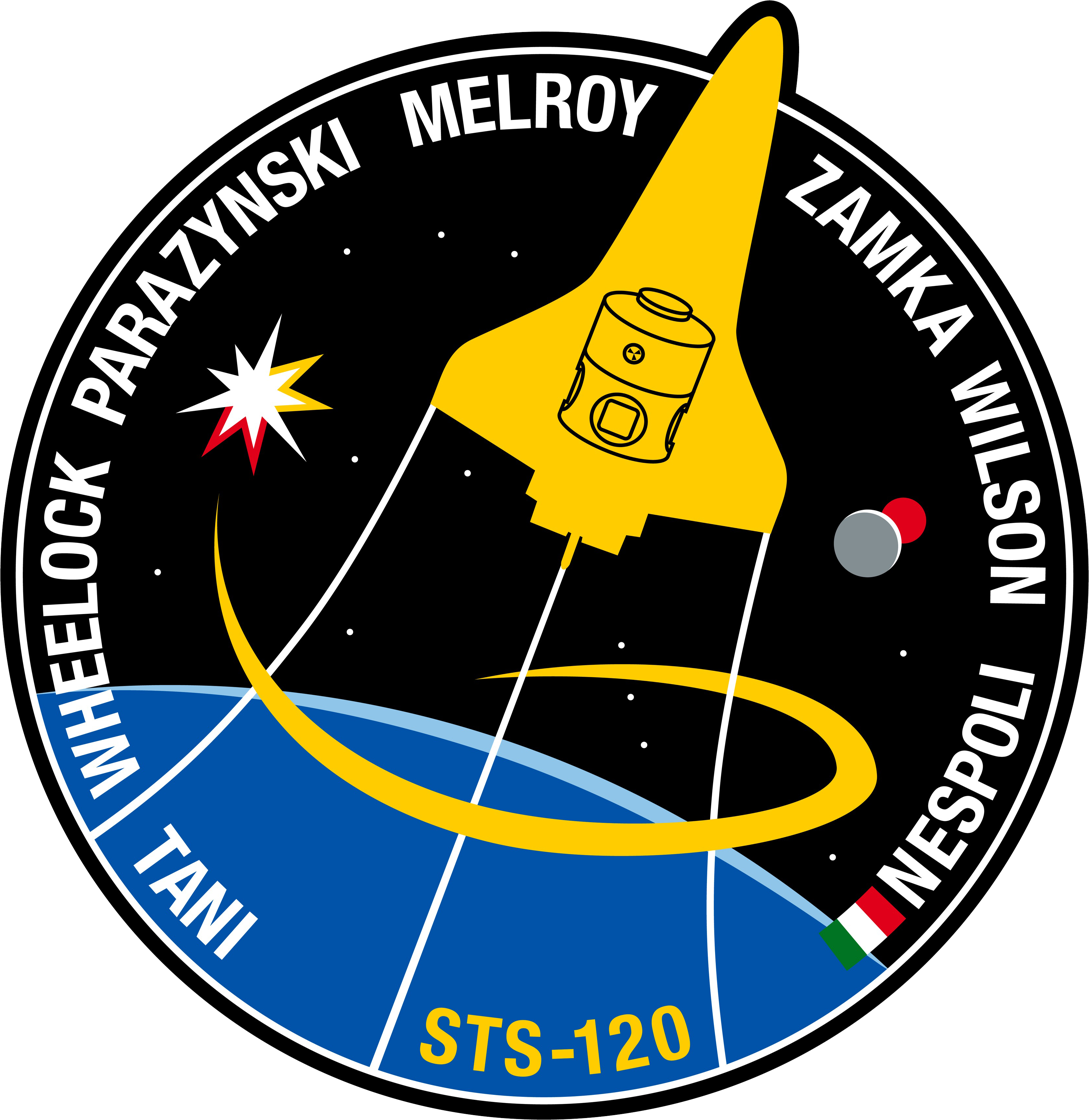
- Mission insignia

Pamela Ann Melroy (born September 17, 1961) is an American retired United States Air Force officer and NASA astronaut who also served as the deputy administrator of NASA. She served as pilot on Space Shuttle missions STS-92 and STS-112 and commanded mission STS-120 before leaving the agency in August 2009. After serving as deputy program manager of Space Exploration Initiatives with Lockheed Martin, Melroy joined the Federal Aviation Administration in 2011, where she was a senior technical advisor and director of field operations for the FAA's Office of Commercial Space Transportation.

In 2013, she left the FAA and joined DARPA as deputy director of the Tactical Technology Office. She left the agency in February 2017.

In November 2021, Melroy was inducted into the United States Astronaut Hall of Fame at the Kennedy Space Center Visitor Complex. The ceremony, originally planned for May 2020, was delayed due to the COVID-19 pandemic.

Melroy served as Deputy Administrator of NASA from 2021 to 2025, helping design strategies like Moon to Mars (Artemis), NASA 2040, Low Earth Orbit (LEO) Commercialization and Space Sustainability.

Today, she works as a strategic advisor and keynote speaker.

== Early life and education ==
Melroy was born in Palo Alto, California, and graduated from Bishop Kearney High School in Rochester, New York in 1979. She received a Bachelor of Arts in physics and astronomy from Wellesley College in 1983. She then earned her Master of Science in Earth and planetary science from the Massachusetts Institute of Technology in 1984. On May 18, 2008, Melroy received an honorary degree from Iona College in New Rochelle, New York.

== Career ==
=== Military ===
Melroy was commissioned through Air Force ROTC, Detachment 365, in 1984. After completing a master's degree, she attended Undergraduate Pilot Training at Reese Air Force Base in Lubbock, Texas and was graduated in 1985. She flew the KC-10 for six years at Barksdale Air Force Base in Bossier City, Louisiana, as a copilot, aircraft commander and instructor pilot. Melroy is a veteran of the United States invasion of Panama and Operation Desert Shield/Desert Storm, with over 200 combat and combat support hours. In June 1991, she attended the Air Force Test Pilot School at Edwards Air Force Base, California. Upon her graduation, she was assigned to the C-17 Combined Test Force, where she served as a test pilot until her selection for the astronaut program. She has logged over 5,000 hours of flight time in over 50 different aircraft. Melroy retired from the Air Force in February 2007.

=== NASA ===
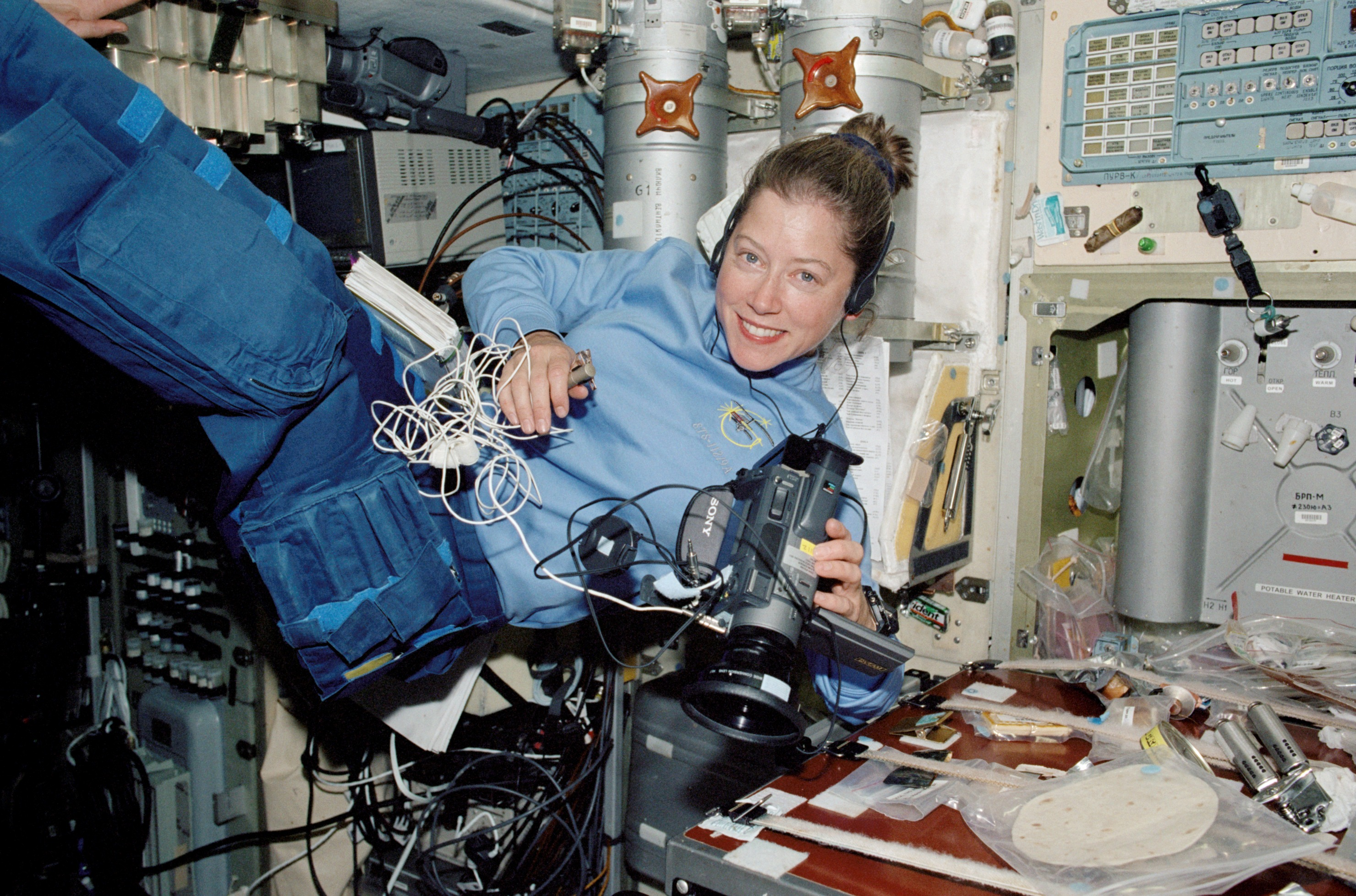
Melroy aboard the ISS during STS-112

Selected as an astronaut candidate by NASA in December 1994, Melroy reported to the Johnson Space Center in March 1995. She completed a year of training and evaluation and was qualified for flight assignment as a shuttle pilot. Initially assigned to astronaut support duties for launch and landing, she also worked Advanced Projects for the Astronaut Office. She also performed CAPCOM duties in mission control. Melroy served on the Columbia Reconstruction Team as the lead for the crew module and served as deputy project manager for the Columbia crew survival investigation team. In her final position, she served as branch chief for the Orion branch of the Astronaut Office.

Melroy served as pilot on two flights (STS-92 in 2000 and STS-112 in 2002), and was the mission commander on STS-120 in 2007, making her the second woman to command a Space Shuttle mission (after Eileen Collins). The STS-120 crew visited the station during Expedition 16, commanded by Peggy Whitson. Whitson was the first female ISS commander, making the STS-120 mission the first time that two female mission commanders were in orbit at the same time.

She has logged more than 924 hours (over 38 days) in space.

==== Spaceflight experience ====
- STS-92 Discovery (October 11–24, 2000) was launched from the Kennedy Space Center, Florida and returned to land at Edwards Air Force Base, California. During the 13-day flight, the seven member crew attached the Z1 Truss and Pressurized Mating Adapter 3 to the International Space Station using Discovery's robotic arm and performed four spacewalks to configure these elements. This expansion of the ISS opened the door for future assembly missions and prepared the station for its first resident crew. The STS-92 mission was accomplished in 202 orbits, traveling 5.3 million miles in 12 days, 21 hours, 40 minutes and 25 seconds.
- STS-112 Atlantis (October 7–18, 2002) launched from and returned to land at the Kennedy Space Center, Florida. STS-112 was an International Space Station assembly mission during which the crew conducted joint operations with the Expedition-5 by delivering and installing the S1 Truss (the third piece of the station's 11-piece Integrated Truss Structure). It took three spacewalks to outfit and activate the new component, during which Melroy acted as internal spacewalk choreographer. STS-112 was the first shuttle mission to use a camera on the External Tank, providing a live view of the launch to flight controllers and NASA TV viewers. The mission was accomplished in 170 orbits, traveling 4.5 million miles in 10 days, 19 hours, and 58 minutes.
- STS-120 Discovery (October 23 – November 7, 2007) launched from and returned to land at the Kennedy Space Center. During the mission, the Node 2 element named Harmony was delivered to the International Space Station. This element opened up the capability for future international laboratories to be added to the station. In addition, the P6 Solar Array was re-located from the Z1 Truss to the end of the port side of the Integrated Truss Structure. During the re-deploy of the array, the array panels snagged and were damaged. An unplanned spacewalk was successfully performed to repair the array. The mission was accomplished in 238 orbits, traveling 6.2 million miles in 15 days, 2 hours, and 23 minutes.

==== Deputy administrator ====
Pam Melroy in 2022

In November 2020, Melroy was announced as a member of President-elect Joe Biden's presidential transition Agency Review Team, where her role was to support transition efforts related to NASA. This fueled speculation that Melroy was under consideration for the role of NASA Administrator in the Biden administration (then-Administrator James Bridenstine had indicated that he did not intend to stay in the role under Biden, even if asked).

On April 16, 2021, the White House announced their intent to nominate Melroy to be NASA's deputy administrator, under former Democratic Senator Bill Nelson, who was nominated by the White House on March 19, 2021, to be the agency's administrator. On April 22, 2021, her nomination was sent to the Senate. The Senate Committee on Commerce, Science, and Transportation held a hearing on May 20, 2021, in which Melroy won strong bipartisan support to be deputy administrator. During her hearing, Melroy expressed support for extending the lifetime of the International Space Station, and said she would work closely with Nelson in running the agency.

On June 16, 2021, Melroy's nomination was reported out of the Senate Commerce Committee by voice vote and the following day, she was confirmed by the full Senate with unanimous consent. On June 21, 2021, Melroy was sworn into office by administrator Bill Nelson. Melroy served as NASA deputy administrator through the end of the Biden Administration, leaving office January 20, 2025. On April 25, 2025, Melroy was honored with the National Space Trophy by the Rotary National Award for Space Achievement Foundation, and in September 2025, it was announced that Melroy was appointed to the Board of Directors for Venus Aerospace.

== Personal life ==
Melroy is married to Douglas Hollett, a geologist, who was previously acting assistant secretary for fossil energy in the United States Department of Energy and vice president for Southeast Asia exploration at Marathon Oil.

== Awards ==
Melroy has received various rewards over her career.

1995: USAF Air Medal, 1st Oak Leaf Cluster

2006: Wellesley College Alumnae Achievement Award

2007: Flight Achievement Award, American Astronautical Society

2007, 2009: NASA Outstanding Leadership Medal

2017: Secretary of Defense Medal for Outstanding Public Service

2019: Public Achievement Award, American Institute of Aeronautics and Astronautics (AIAA)

2021: US Astronaut Hall of Fame

2023: Wash100 Award for Leadership in Advancing Space & Aeronautics Innovation

2025: National Space Trophy for Lifetime Achievement Award from the Rotary National Awards for Space Achievement Foundation
