= Shana Dale =

American lawyer

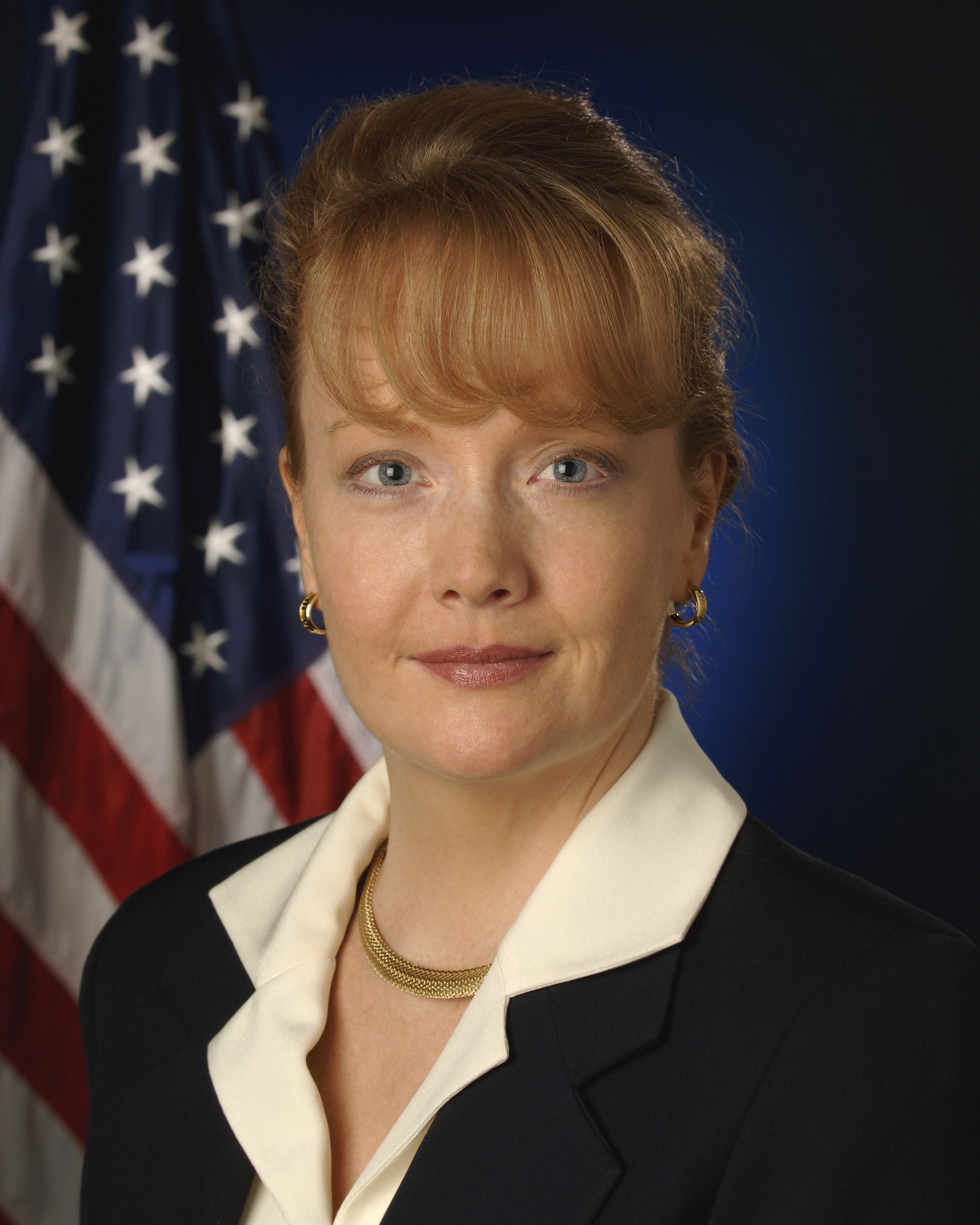
- Dale in 2005

11th Deputy Administrator of the National Aeronautics and Space Administration
- In office November 4, 2005 – January 17, 2009
- President: George W. Bush
- Preceded by: Frederick D. Gregory
- Succeeded by: Lori Garver

Personal details
- Born: 1964 (age 61–62) Georgia, United States
- Party: Republican
- Education: University of Tulsa; California Western School of Law

Shana L. Dale (born 1964 in Georgia) is an American politician and lawyer. She served as the Deputy Administrator of the National Aeronautics and Space Administration (NASA) in the George W. Bush administration from 2005 to 2009.

== Education and career ==
Before coming to NASA, Dale was deputy director for Homeland and National Security for the Office of Science and Technology Policy (OSTP) in the Executive Office of the President of the United States. She co-chaired the National Science and Technology Council’s Committee on Homeland and National Security and supervised work of the subcommittees. Dale previously served as the chief of staff and general counsel at OSTP. In this position, she led and managed the staff officials involved with homeland and national security, legislative affairs, press operations, legal and ethical issues, the federal research & development budget, and internal budget and administration.

Earlier in her career, Dale served as the assistant vice chancellor for federal relations at the University of Texas System, Federal Relations Office in Washington, D.C. In addition, Dale had more than ten years of service on Capitol Hill including her tenure as staff director to the House of Representatives Subcommittee on Space and Aeronautics. Dale also served on the board of directors for Women in Aerospace for four years.

Prior to serving as staff director, Dale was the Republican assistant legislative director and counsel on the space subcommittee. She was appointed to the Committee on Science, Space and Technology in March 1991, as the Republican counsel on the subcommittee on science. Dale also served on the House Public Works & Transportation Committee.

Before moving to Washington, Dale was employed in private law practice in San Diego, California. She received her bachelor’s with honors in management information systems from the University of Tulsa and her Juris Doctor degree from California Western School of Law. She is a member of the bars of California and the District of Columbia, and is admitted to practice before the United States Supreme Court.

== Deputy Administrator of NASA ==
Her nomination was announced by the White House on September 9, 2005, and sent her nomination to the Senate on September 13. Also on September 13, NASA Administrator Michael Griffin issued a press release saying he was "delighted" with the nomination and she would make a "valuable addition to NASA's team". He added later that it was he who recommended her for the position. She replaced Frederick D. Gregory as Deputy Administrator. She was the first woman to hold that position and thus the highest-ranked female official in NASA up to that point. Her nomination also drew praise from the National Space Society and the American Astronautical Society. Dale was confirmed as Deputy Administrator on November 4, 2005, and sworn in on November 29, 2005.

Dale had applied to work at NASA just after graduating from law school but was not hired. After being sworn in as deputy administrator, she joked that she could finally put NASA on her résumé.

In her blog on the NASA website, she declared that she was preparing to transition out of NASA in January 2009. She resigned her NASA post effective 17 January 2009. Dale was succeeded as Deputy Administrator of NASA by fellow Women in Aerospace board member Lori Garver.

== After NASA ==
After her resignation as Deputy Administrator of NASA, Dale worked once again for the House Committee on Science, Space and Technology, before taking a job with Dell's Science, Engineering, and Technology Services (SETS) division in Fairfax, Virginia. Dale then went on to serve as Deputy Associate Administrator of the FAA’s Office of Commercial Space Transportation, a position she has held since November 3, 2014. In January 2017, she was "loaned" to the White House for four months.

Government offices
Preceded by Frederick D. Gregory	Deputy Administrator of NASA; November 4, 2005 – January 17, 2009	Succeeded by Lori Garver
