= James Morhard =

American government official (born 1956)

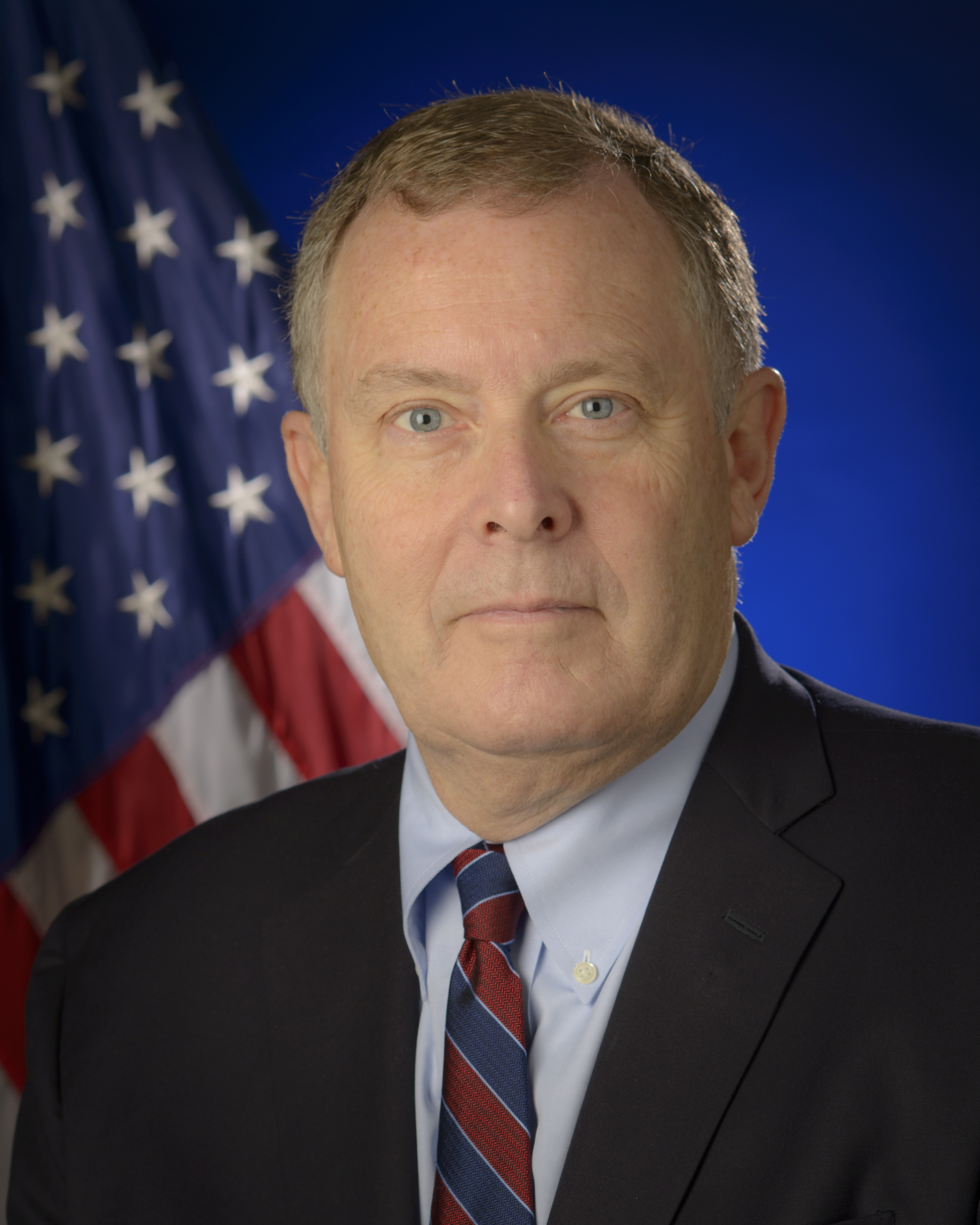

14th Deputy Administrator of the National Aeronautics and Space Administration
- In office October 17, 2018 – January 20, 2021
- President: Donald Trump
- Preceded by: Dava Newman
- Succeeded by: Pamela Melroy

Personal details
- Born: September 20, 1956 (age 70) Washington, D.C., U.S.
- Education: Saint Francis University (BS); George Washington University (MBA); Georgetown University (JD)

James Morhard (born 20 September 1956) is a former American government official who served as the Deputy Administrator of NASA under President Donald Trump.

== Biography ==
=== Early life and education ===
Morhard was born in Washington, DC. He received his Bachelor of Science in Accounting from Saint Francis University, his Master's in Business Administration from George Washington University, and his J.D. from Georgetown University.

=== Career ===
Morhard began his career in the Secretary of the Navy’s Office of the Comptroller. Morhard later served as Staff Director of the Committee on Appropriations, where he also managed the Subcommittee on Commerce, Justice, State, and the Judiciary, as it was called during the 108th Congress (2003–05), now known as the Subcommittee on Commerce, Justice, Science, and Related Agencies. He also oversaw the Appropriations Subcommittee on Military Construction, as it was called up to the 108th Congress, now the Subcommittee on Military Construction, Veterans Affairs, and Related Agencies. This subcommittee was responsible for funding all construction activities within the Department of Defense.

Morhard served as Deputy Sergeant at Arms for the United States Senate from January 2015 to October 2018.

Morhard was nominated by then President Donald Trump on July 12, 2018, to serve as Deputy Administrator for NASA and was confirmed on October 11, 2018, in a voice vote. At the time of his nomination, Morhard was noted for his lack of experience in space technology, but his strong bipartisan connections on Capitol Hill and Appropriations Committee experience were noted as potential benefits for the Agency. James Morhard resigned from NASA after Donald Trump left office on January 20, 2021.

He is one of four survivors of the 2010 Alaska DHC-3 Otter crash that killed five others on board, including former U.S. Senator Ted Stevens of Alaska.
