= 2010 Alaska DHC-3 crash =

2010 aviation accident in Alaska

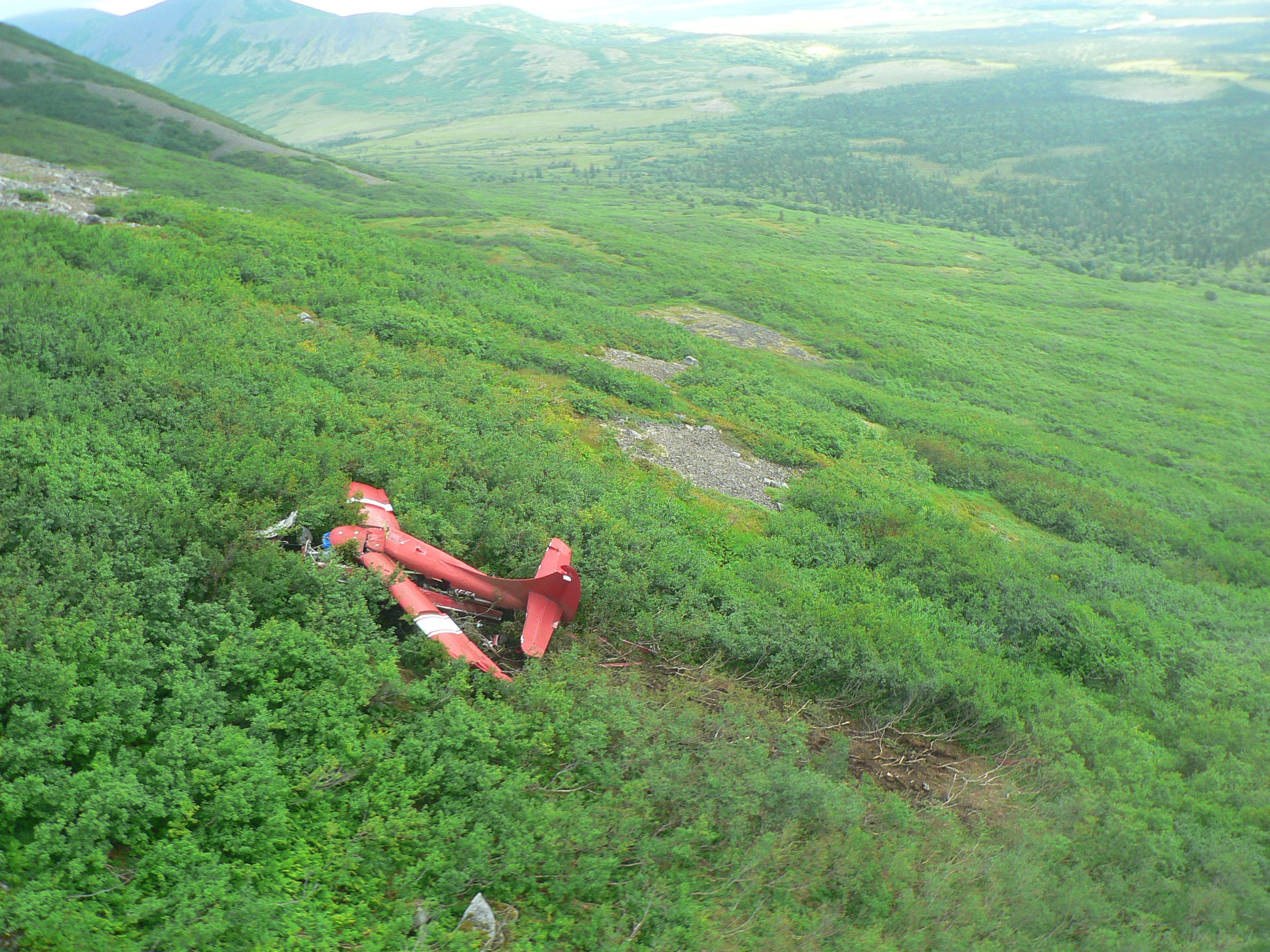
- Wreckage of the aircraft

Accident
- Date: August 9, 2010
- Summary: Controlled flight into terrain in low visibility due to pilot error
- Site: Near Aleknagik; 59°19′46″N 158°22′52″W

Aircraft
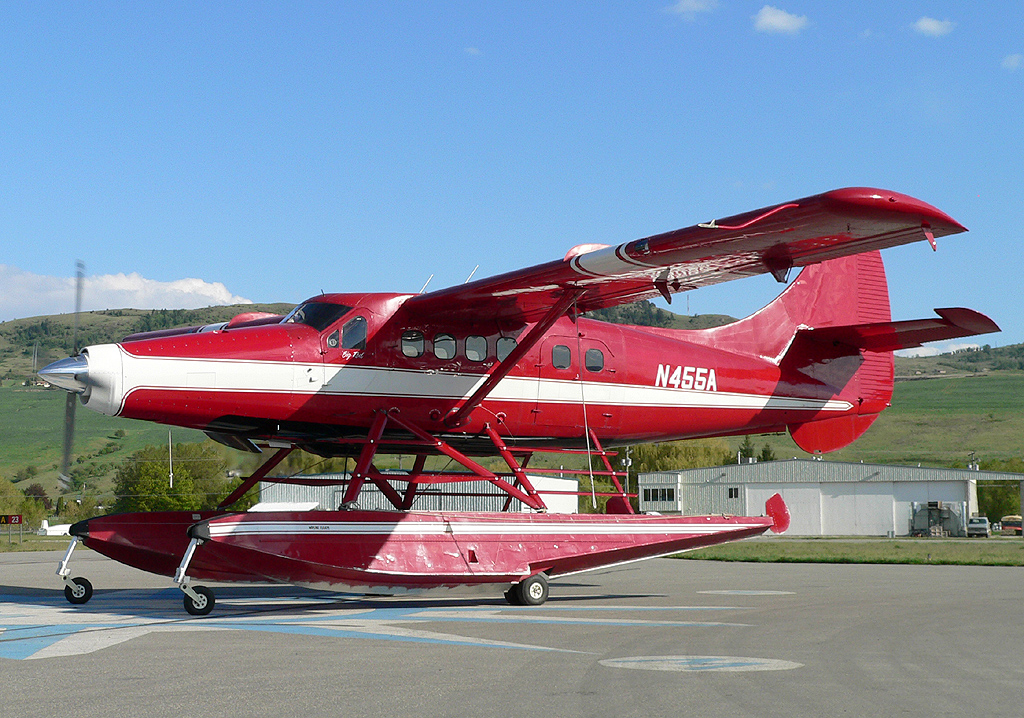
- N455A, the aircraft involved in the accident, seen in 2005
- Aircraft type: de Havilland Canada DHC-3T Turbo Otter
- Operator: GCI
- Registration: N455A
- Flight origin: Nerka Lake, Alaska
- Destination: HRM Sports camp, Nushagak River, Alaska
- Occupants: 9
- Passengers: 8
- Crew: 1
- Fatalities: 5
- Injuries: 4
- Survivors: 4

On August 9, 2010, a privately operated de Havilland Canada DHC-3 Otter amphibious floatplane crashed near Aleknagik, Alaska, killing five of the nine people on board. The fatalities included former U.S. Senator Ted Stevens, while the survivors included former Administrator of NASA and then-CEO of EADS North America Sean O'Keefe, his son, and future Deputy Administrator of NASA James Morhard.

The aircraft, a single-engine de Havilland Canada DHC-3 Otter registered to GCI, crashed on a mountainside while on a flight between two fishing lodges. Stevens and O'Keefe had been on a fishing trip. The wreckage was quickly located after an aerial search, but rescue efforts were hampered by poor weather.

== Accident ==
The floatplane crashed at around 2:30 p.m. Alaska Daylight Time (UTC-8), 10 miles (16 km) northwest of Aleknagik. After it was reported that the aircraft had not landed as scheduled, other pilots launched a search and located the wreckage on a 40-degree slope in the mountainous Dillingham region. The flight was being conducted under visual flight rules and was not monitored by radar at the time of the accident, since there is no such coverage in the area under 4000 feet. Other pilots who had flown in the same area during the course of the day described weather conditions in the region as "very bad" with visibility at times being less than 1 mile (1.6 km).

== Rescue efforts ==
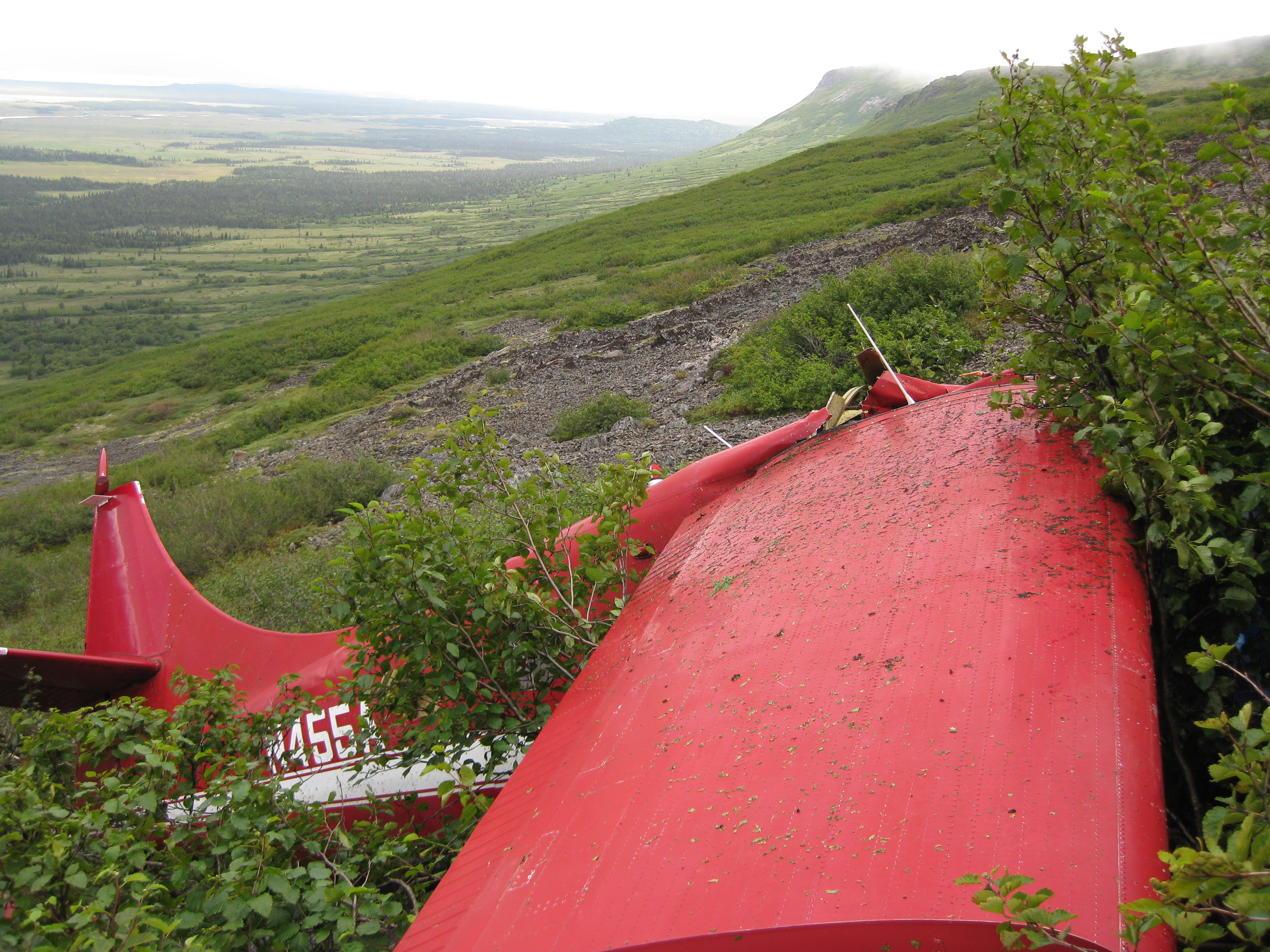
Closeup of the wreckage

Local responders were on the mountain within a half hour of the airplane being located around 6:30 p.m. A doctor and emergency medical technicians were dropped off by helicopter the same day and spent the night providing aid to crash survivors.

Early in the morning as the Alaska Air National Guard arrived at the scene, also by helicopter, the first responders assisted rescuers in navigating to the site with rain and fog in the area hampering rescue and recovery efforts.

U.S. Coast Guard assets from Coast Guard Air Station Kodiak were also launched. A MH-60J Jayhawk helicopter crew arrived on scene and deployed their rescue swimmer to the crash site to assist Air National Guard pararescuemen in extricating and treating patients for transport to medical care. Survivors were transported to Dillingham after being hoisted into both the Air National Guard and Coast Guard helicopters. The crew was met in Dillingham by a HC-130H Hercules aircraft and crew from Coast Guard Air Station Kodiak. They embarked and transported several patients, including O'Keefe's son Kevin. The aircrew also transported two Air National Guard pararescuemen so that they could continue work on and monitor the medical conditions of the survivors. Due to the nature of the survivors' injuries, the cabin could not be pressurized and the aircrew flew at a lower altitude. All patients were delivered to awaiting EMS in Anchorage at Kulis Air National Guard Base.

A spokesperson for the Alaska National Guard said that rescuers were giving medical aid to survivors of the crash, and that three survivors were being airlifted to Providence Alaska Medical Center in Anchorage. Upon examination of the wreckage it was discovered that the ELT antenna had separated from the ELT housing on impact, thus disabling the emergency signal. It was also later determined that a functional satellite telephone that could have been used to summon aid was on board, but it went unused for hours, because passengers did not know it was there.

== Passengers ==
The aircraft was carrying eight passengers and one pilot. Four of the passengers and the pilot died and two more were badly injured, with the last two suffering only minor injuries. Among the five fatalities was Ted Stevens, who was a former U.S. Senator from Alaska. Also among the fatalities were a GCI executive and her 16-year-old daughter. Among the survivors were former NASA Administrator Sean O'Keefe and his 19-year-old son Kevin, both of whom sustained non-life-threatening injuries but were listed in critical and serious conditions respectively the night after the crash. The senior O'Keefe sustained leg and neck injuries, and several of his teeth were broken.

Stevens and O'Keefe had been fishing together before, and had been planning a fishing trip to a site near Dillingham at the time of the crash. Stevens had survived a crash at Anchorage International Airport in 1978 that killed his first wife. Pilot Theron "Terry" Smith, who also died, had lost his son-in-law in another plane crash less than two weeks before.

Also among the dead was one of Stevens' former staff members, Bill Phillips. His youngest son, Willy, was seriously injured, and had to spend the night at the crash site with his dead father along with Jim Morhard, who survived.

== Investigation ==
The National Transportation Safety Board (NTSB) sent a team to the site of the accident to investigate the cause of the crash. The team returned an inconclusive report in May 2011. They speculated that the pilot, a recovered stroke victim, may have fallen asleep or had a seizure, but there was no direct evidence to support these theories. The report was critical of the Federal Aviation Administration's re-certification process, stating:

The Federal Aviation Administration's internal guidance for medical certification of pilots following stroke is inadequate because it is conflicting and unclear, does not specifically address the risk of recurrence associated with such an event, and does not specifically recommend a neuropsychological evaluation (formal cognitive testing) to evaluate potential subtle cognitive impairment.

The report went on to note that the airplane was equipped with a Terrain Awareness and Warning System, but that the pilot had elected to fly with the system turned off. Because much of Alaska's terrain is highly variable, bush pilots will often de-activate the system, as it issues many false warnings.
