= Space Force Association =

American non-profit organization

- Formation: October 29, 2019; 7 years ago
- Founder: Bill "Hippie" Woolf
- Founded at: Colorado Springs, Colorado
- Type: 501(c)(3) nonprofit organization
- Purpose: space, space force, united states space force, united states, ussf, international, space industry
- Headquarters: Colorado Springs, Colorado
- President and Founder: Colonel Bill "Hippie" Woolf, Air Force Space Command (Ret)
- General Manager: Rhonda Sheya
- Chief Growth Officer: Colonel (Ret) Matt Anderson
- Website: ussfa.org

The Space Force Association (SFA) is an American independent, 501(c)(3) non-profit professional military association for the United States Space Force. Its declared mission is "to achieve superior national space power by shaping a Space Force that provides credible deterrence in competition, dominant capability in combat, and professional services for all partners."

The Space Force Association is also a space advocacy group and space education association for the United States Space Force and space professionals at large.

== History ==
The Space Force Association was established on 29 October 2019, two months before the establishment of the Space Force on 20 December 2019. The Space Force Association compares itself to the Air Force Association, which was established in January 1946 to support the standup of the United States Air Force, which occurred in September 1947.

Since establishment, the Space Force Association has run a number of interviews and podcasts with Space Force leadership and members on the development of the Space Force and on space policy and strategy.

On 9 September 2020, several U.S. senators announced the creation of the Space Force Caucus, which the Space Force Association had been working on standing up since March 2020.
