= Deputy Administrator of NASA =

NASA official

Deputy Administrator of the National Aeronautics and Space Administration
- Seal of the National Aeronautics and Space Administration

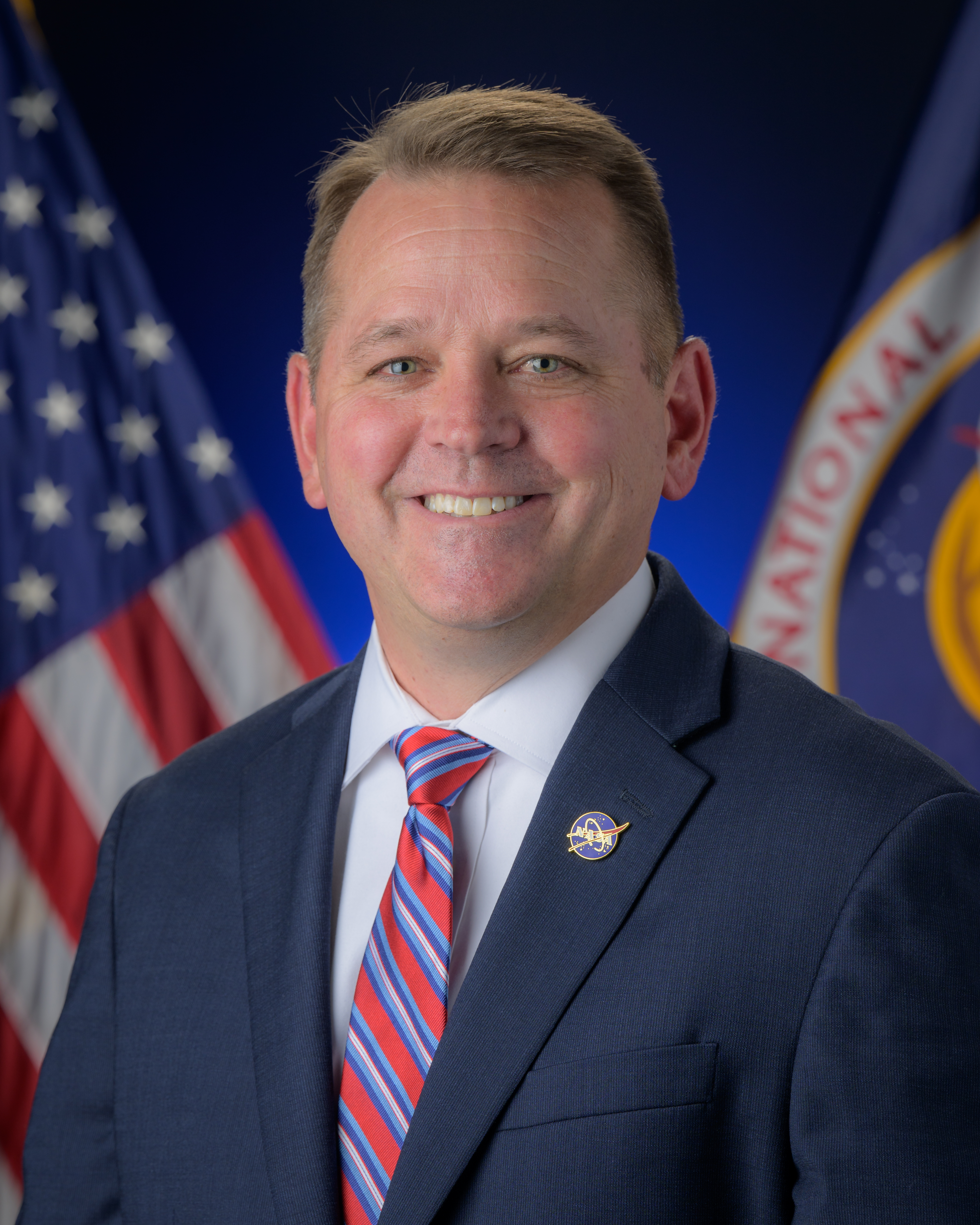
- Incumbent; Matthew P. Anderson since May 21, 2026
- National Aeronautics and Space Administration
- Reports to: Administrator of NASA
- Seat: Mary W. Jackson NASA Headquarters, Washington, D.C.
- Appointer: The president; with advice and consent of the Senate
- Term length: No fixed term
- Constituting instrument: 51 U.S.C. § 20111
- Formation: August 19, 1958; 68 years ago
- First holder: Hugh Latimer Dryden
- Salary: Executive Schedule, Level III
- Website: nasa.gov

The deputy administrator of the National Aeronautics and Space Administration is the second-highest-ranking official of NASA, the national space agency of the United States. Administrator of NASA is NASA's chief decision maker, responsible for providing clarity to the agency's vision and serving as a source of internal leadership within NASA. The office holder also has an important place within United States space policy. Additionally the deputy administrator is first in the line of succession for the administrator of NASA followed by the associate administrator of NASA.

== History ==
The longest-running (acting) deputy administrator was John R. Dailey, who held the post following his retirement from the United States Marine Corps. The longest-running full deputy administrator was Hugh Latimer Dryden, who was the first deputy administrator. William R. Graham has held the post of deputy administrator twice, and was the acting administrator in between, as did Frederick D. Gregory. Dr. Daniel Mulville served as the acting deputy administrator twice, and was acting administrator in between.

== Deputy administrators ==
Denotes an acting deputy administrator of NASA

No.	Photograph	Name	Term start	Term end	Term length	Ref(s)
1	Hugh L. Dryden	Dr. Hugh L. Dryden	August 19, 1958	December 2, 1965	2,662 days	
2	Robert C. Seamans (Left)	Dr. Robert C. Seamans Jr.	December 21, 1965	January 5, 1968	745 days	
3	Thomas O. Paine	Dr. Thomas O. Paine	March 25, 1968	March 20, 1969	360 days	
4	George M. Low	Dr. George M. Low	December 3, 1969	June 5, 1976	2,376 days	
5	Alan M. Lovelace	Dr. Alan M. Lovelace	July 2, 1976	July 10, 1981	1,834 days	
6	Hans Mark	Dr. Hans Mark	July 10, 1981	September 1, 1984	1,149 days	
7	William R. Graham	Dr. William R. Graham	November 25, 1985	December 4, 1985	9 days	
8	William R. Graham	Dr. William R. Graham	May 11, 1986	October 1, 1986	143 days	
9	Dale D. Myers	Dale D. Myers	October 6, 1986	May 13, 1989	950 days	
10	James R. Thompson	James R. Thompson, Jr.	July 6, 1989	November 8, 1991	885 days	
-	Aaron Cohen	Aaron Cohen	February 19, 1992	November 1, 1992	256 days	
-	John R. Dailey	John R. Dailey	November 3, 1992	December 31, 1999	2,614 days	
-	Daniel Mulville	Dr. Daniel Mulville	January 1, 2000	November 19, 2001	688 days	
-	Daniel Mulville	Dr. Daniel Mulville	December 21, 2001	August 11, 2002	233 days	
10	Frederick D. Gregory	Frederick D. Gregory	August 12, 2002	February 20, 2005	923 days	
10	Frederick D. Gregory	Frederick D. Gregory	April 14, 2005	November 4, 2005	204 days	
11	Shana Dale	Shana Dale	November 4, 2005	January 17, 2009	1,171 days	
12	Lori Garver	Lori Garver	July 17, 2009	September 6, 2013	1,512 days	
13	Dava Newman	Dr. Dava Newman	May 15, 2015	January 20, 2017	616 days	
-		Lesa Roe	January 20, 2017	September 30, 2017	253 days	
-		Krista Paquin	September 30, 2017	May 2018	8 months	
14		James Morhard	October 17, 2018	January 20, 2021	826 days	
15		Pamela Melroy	June 21, 2021	January 20, 2025	1,309 days	
16		Matthew P. Anderson	May 21, 2026	Incumbent	169 days	
