= Aaron Cohen (Deputy NASA administrator) =

Former Deputy Administrator of NASA

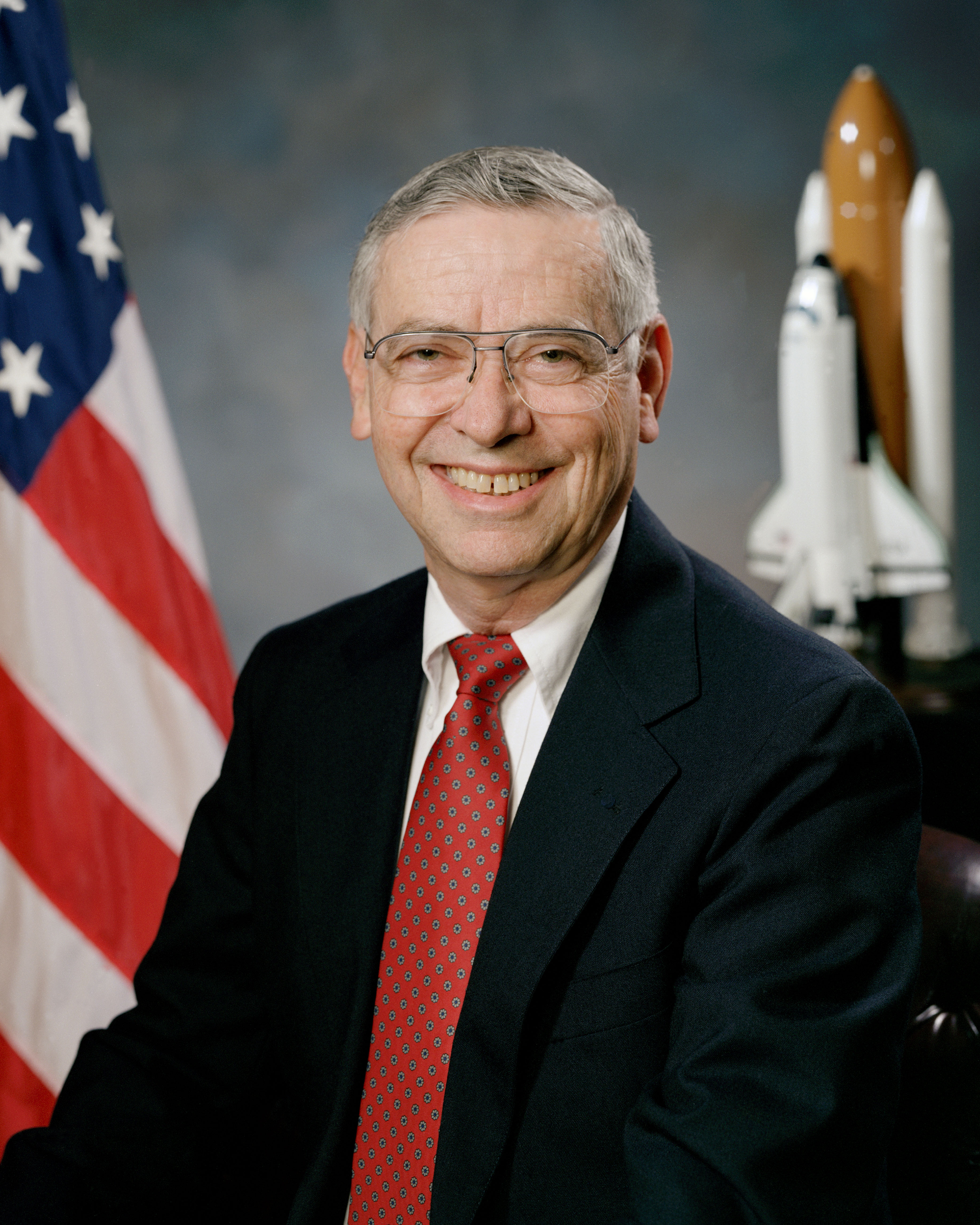
Aaron Cohen

Aaron Cohen (January 5, 1931 – February 25, 2010) was the Acting Deputy Administrator of NASA between 19 February 1992 and 1 November 1992 as well as the manager of the Space Shuttle Program from 1972.

== Education ==
Cohen graduated from Thomas Jefferson High School in San Antonio, Texas. He received a Bachelor of Science degree from Texas A&M University in 1952, a Master of Science degree from Stevens Institute of Technology in 1958, and an honorary doctorate from Stevens in 1982.

== Career ==
Cohen joined NASA in 1962 and served in key leadership roles critical to the success of the flights and lunar landings of the Apollo Program. From 1969 to 1972, Cohen was the manager for the Apollo Command and Service Modules. He oversaw the design, development, production and test flights of the Space Shuttles as manager of NASA's Space Shuttle Orbiter Project Office from 1972 to 1982. After serving as Director of Engineering at Johnson for several years, he was named director of the center in 1986, serving in that post until 1993. In 1984, he was awarded the ASME Medal.

After his retirement from NASA, Cohen taught mechanical engineering design at Texas A&M University. In 2000, he was appointed Professor Emeritus, and in 2010, he was awarded an honorary Doctor of Letters.
