= Lesa Roe =

American aerospace engineer

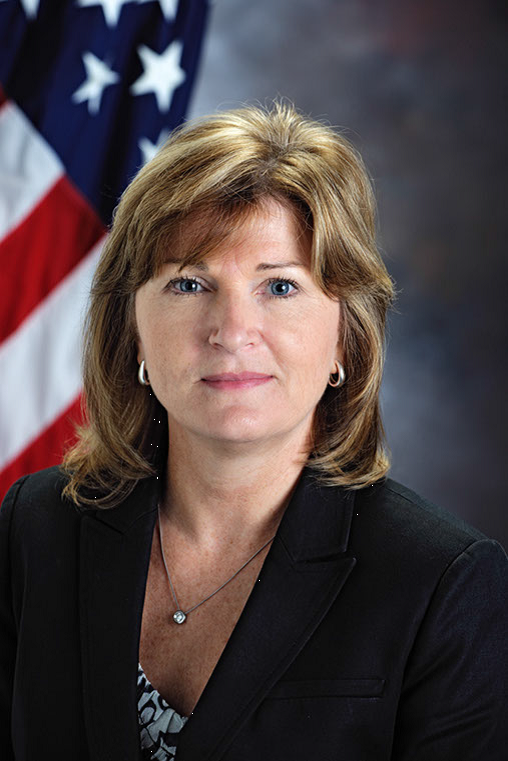

Chancellor of the University of North Texas System
- In office October 1, 2017 – December 31, 2021
- Preceded by: Lee F. Jackson
- Succeeded by: Michael R. Williams

Acting Deputy Administrator of NASA
- In office January 20, 2017 – September 30, 2017
- President: Donald Trump
- Leader: Robert M. Lightfoot Jr. (acting)
- Preceded by: Dava Newman

Deputy Associate Administrator of NASA
- In office May 1, 2014 – September 30, 2017
- President: Barack Obama; Donald Trump
- Leader: Charles Bolden
- Preceded by: Richard Keegan
- Succeeded by: Krista Paquin

Director of the Langley Research Center (NASA)
- In office October 3, 2005 – April 28, 2014
- President: George W. Bush; Barack Obama
- Preceded by: Roy D. Bridges Jr.
- Succeeded by: Stephen G. Jurczyk

Personal details
- Born: 1962 or 1963 (age 62–63) Florida
- Education: University of Florida; University of Central Florida
- Profession: Engineer

Lesa B. Roe is an American aerospace engineer, Deputy Associate Administrator of NASA, and former acting Deputy Administrator of NASA. She served as the Chancellor of the University of North Texas System from 2017 to 2021. Most recently Solid Power Inc. named Lesa Roe to its board of directors. Solid Power develops solid-state rechargeable battery products for government and commercial markets, including aerospace and electric vehicles.

== Biography ==
She received her bachelor's degree in electrical engineering from the University of Florida, and her master's degree in electrical engineering from the University of Central Florida.

Roe served as chancellor of the University of North Texas from 2017 to 2021.

Prior to becoming chancellor, Roe served as the Acting Deputy Administrator of NASA from January 20, 2017, to September 30, 2017, and was the Deputy Associate Administrator from May 1, 2014, to September 30, 2017. Roe also served as the Director of NASA Langley Research Center from 2005 to 2014, the first woman to hold that position. She previously served as the center's Deputy Director from June 2004 until being named Director in October 2005. Roe in totality served 32 years at NASA, managed the employment of over 17,000 employees with a budget of 19.6 billion.

== Awards ==
Roe has received many awards, including the NASA Exceptional Service Medal and YWCA Women of Distinction in Space and Technology honor.
