= UNT Health Fort Worth =

Public medical school in Fort Worth, Texas

- Type: Public medical school
- Established: 1970
- Parent institution: University of North Texas System
- Accreditation: SACS
- Endowment: $110.4 million
- Budget: $1.4 billion (2024)
- President: Kirk Calhoun
- Faculty: 1,449 faculty and staff
- Students: 2,338
- Location: Fort Worth, Texas, U.S. 32°44′55″N 97°22′10″W
- Campus: Urban, 33.5 acres (13.6 ha)
- Website: www.unthealth.edu

UNT Health Fort Worth, formerly the University of North Texas Health Science Center (UNTHSC), is an academic health science center in Fort Worth, Texas. It is part of the University of North Texas System and was founded in 1970 as the Texas College of Osteopathic Medicine, with its first cohort graduating in 1974. The health science center has consisted of four colleges since a 2026 reorganization, and enrolled 2,410 students in fall 2025.

UNT Health serves as home to several NIH-funded research programs and currently leads all Texas medical and health science centers in research growth. UNT Health also houses the Atrium Gallery, a nonprofit public art exhibition space which holds eight to 10 arts shows each year.

== History ==
UNT Health Fort Worth was founded in 1970 as the Texas College of Osteopathic Medicine (TCOM). TCOM was the first osteopathic medical school to be established in Texas. The college initially operated out of the Fort Worth Osteopathic Hospital as well as a small white house and its adjacent garage. In 1971, classes were moved into the converted Taverner Bowling Alley.

In 1975, the Texas Legislature passed Senate Bill 216. This law transformed TCOM into a state-supported medical school under the direction of North Texas State University's Board of Regents. TCOM used its state funding to break ground on several new facilities for its Fort Worth campus, which at the time was 16 acres.

In 1993, TCOM established its Graduate School of Biomedical Sciences and renamed itself University of North Texas Health Science Center (UNTHSC). In 1999, UNTHSC opened its School of Public Health.

In 2004, UNTHSC opened a new Center for Biohealth facility. That same year, the university also opened its School of Health Professions.

In 2013, UNTHSC opened its College of Pharmacy. Its inaugural class consisted of 82 students pursuing a PharmD. By this time, the university comprised five colleges and its campus had expanded to 33 acres. In 2015, UNTHSC and TCU announced the creation of a joint MD school, which began matriculating students in 2018. During the height of the COVID-19 pandemic, UNTHSC partnered with the Tarrant County Department of Public Health to perform contact tracing. The program included 90 students working part time to interview people who tested positive for COVID and find out where they had traveled as well as who they had been in contact with.

In 2022, UNT Health Science Center's Physician Assistant, Health Care Management, Public Health, and Physical Therapy programs were ranked #33, #65, #90, and #97, respectively, by U.S. News & World Report. That same year, UNTHSC opened its Regional Simulation Center, a facility that uses virtual reality technology in conjunction with mannequins and multi-functional spaces in order to simulate health care scenarios. The facility is used as a training tool for medical students as well as more experienced health care providers aiming to hone new skills. Also in 2022, the School of Biomedical Sciences started UNTHSC's first bachelor's degree program in Biomedical Sciences. In 2023, UNTHSC further expanded by opening its College of Nursing. The school was founded in part to address the shortage of trained nurses in Tarrant County.

In September 2024, NBC News revealed that UNTHSC had received around 2,350 unclaimed bodies from Dallas County and Tarrant County since 2019, of which more than 830 bodies were subsequently selected for dissection and study. Some of these studies occurred without the pre-death consent of the deceased or the consent of their survivors. The leasing of unclaimed bodies and body parts, as well as related laboratory space, to for-profit medical device makers and others generated revenue for UNTHSC of around $2.5 million a year. In response to inquiries by NBC News, UNTHSC announced the closure of the BioSkills Lab, the suspension of its Willed Body Program, and the firing of the program's leadership.

In November 2024, UNT Health Science Center received a cease-and-desist letter from the Texas Funeral Service Commission, which stated that it had discovered in an October 2024 inspection that UNT Health Science Center had been liquefying human remains using water cremation, which the Commission claimed to be illegal in the state of Texas. The university responded by citing a section of the Texas administrative code allowing for the practice while also indicating that it had proactively stopped water cremation in September 2024.

In January 2025, UNT Health Science Center was awarded tenth place in the Lown Institute's 2024 Shkreli awards, which seek to highlight profiteering and dysfunction in the healthcare industry.

In July 2025, UNTHSC renamed itself UNT Health Forth Worth.

In February 2026, the University of North Texas System Board of Regents unanimously approved a reorganization and consolidation that reduced UNT Health from six colleges to four, effective June 1, 2026. The change was expected to save about $600,000 a year in administrative costs. The four remaining colleges are the Texas College of Osteopathic Medicine, the College of Nursing, the College of Biomedical and Translational Sciences, and the UNT System College of Pharmacy and Health Professions. No academic programs were eliminated.

== Academics ==
College	Specialized accreditation
Texas College of Osteopathic Medicine (TCOM)	American Osteopathic Association's COCA (osteopathic medicine); Council on Education for Public Health (public health programs)
UNT System College of Pharmacy and Health Professions	Accreditation Council for Pharmacy Education (pharmacy); American Physical Therapy Association (physical therapy)
College of Biomedical and Translational Sciences	None
College of Nursing	

UNT Health Science Center is governed by the University of North Texas Board of Regents. Since the 2026 reorganization, the health science center has been organized into four colleges, offering doctorate-, masters- and bachelors-level programs focusing on healthcare delivery and biomedical science. Doctoral degrees offered include Doctor of Osteopathic Medicine (DO), Doctor of Philosophy (PhD), Doctor of Public Health (DrPH), Doctor of Physical Therapy (DPT), and Doctor of Pharmacy (PharmD).

Master's degrees include Master of Science, Master of Health Administration, and Master of Physician Assistant Studies. In 2021, SBS received preliminary accreditation from Southern Association of Colleges and Schools Commission on Colleges to offer an online bachelor's degree in biomedical sciences. The initial cohort started in fall 2022, and was the first undergraduate program at UNT Health Science Center.

=== Texas College of Osteopathic Medicine ===
The Texas College of Osteopathic Medicine (TCOM) was founded in 1970. It is a public medical school and the first osteopathic medical school in Texas. As a primary care-oriented school, TCOM trains and graduates a large number of U.S. medical students entering general practice fields (e.g. family medicine, internal medicine, or pediatrics), and from 2018 to 2020, fifty-two percent of its graduates matriculated into these fields.

==== Medical curriculum ====
TCOM's medical curriculum consists of two years of pre-clinical studies and two years of clinical rotations. The first year consists of introductory basic science (e.g. anatomy, biochemistry, genetics, and immunology) integrated with physiologic processes structured by body system (cardiovascular, pulmonary, hematologic, musculoskeletal, renal, neurologic, and endocrine). During this time, students also learn physical examination, doctor-patient interactions, and the principles of osteopathic, palpatory diagnosis and manipulative therapy.

After learning the physiologic foundations during the first year, the second-year curriculum shifts focus to disease processes and pathology, which are also organized by body system. TCOM's systems-based, two-pass preclinical curriculum, piloted by Bruce Dubin, DO, Associate Dean of Academic Affairs, has remained the same since conception in 2010 and is now widely replicated at sister osteopathic medical schools (e.g. RVUCOM, KCUMB-COM, etc.). After the first two years, medical students are assigned a third year base site for third year clinical rotations in family medicine, internal medicine, obstetrics and gynecology, general surgery, psychiatry, and pediatrics.

===== COMLEX Board Scores =====
TCOM medical students achieved the highest exam score average, relative to students from all other U.S. osteopathic medical schools, on their COMLEX-USA ("Comprehensive Osteopathic Medical Licensing Examination of the United States") Level 1 Exam in 2019, 2020, and 2022. Level 1, the osteopathic counterpart to NBME's USMLE Step 1, is the first of three exams required for board certification of osteopathic physicians from U.S. medical schools granting the Doctor of Osteopathic Medicine degree. Annual tuition fees since 2020 have covered a 6-month subscription to USMLE World ("UWorld") and TrueLearn ("COMBANK") test bank questions.

==== Teaching hospitals ====
===== Primary teaching hospitals =====
- JPS Health Network in Fort Worth – The primary teaching institution of Texas College of Osteopathic Medicine (TCOM). Anchored by a 578-bed acute care hospital, the network includes more than 25 community-based clinics. John Peter Smith Hospital is home to Tarrant County's first Level I Trauma Center and its only psychiatric emergency services site, which is also the second-busiest psychiatric ER in the country. It is one of two Level I Trauma Centers in Tarrant County.
- Cook Children's Medical Center in Fort Worth – The primary pediatric teaching institution for TCOM, this hospital is licensed for 430 beds and is one of the largest freestanding pediatric medical centers in the U.S. The hospital also has an ACS verified level II pediatric trauma center.
- Texas Health Resources (THR) Harris Methodist Hospital in Fort Worth – Awarded the highest advanced certification by The Joint Commission as a Comprehensive Stroke Center, the 726-bed hospital is also the first in the country to earn the prestigious designation as a Joint Commission Primary Heart Attack Center. Texas Health Resources is the largest faith-based, nonprofit health system in North Texas in terms of inpatients and outpatients served. It is considered a Level I Trauma Center.
- Methodist Dallas Medical Center in Dallas – Home to one of Dallas County's 3 Level 1 Trauma Centers and to a Level III Neonatal Intensive Care Unit (NICU), Methodist Dallas is licensed for 556 beds. Awarded a Gold Seal of Approval from the Joint Commission, the hospital serves more than 175,000 patients per year.
- Driscoll Children's Hospital in Corpus Christi – Driscoll Children's Hospital is a 191-bed pediatric tertiary care center with more than 30 medical and surgical specialties offering care throughout South Texas, including Corpus Christi, the Rio Grande Valley, Victoria, and Laredo. The hospital remains the only free-standing children's hospital in South Texas. In 2020, Driscoll had almost 122,000 patient visits, including almost 28,000 patients seen at South Texas' first emergency room created exclusively for children.
- Medical City Fort Worth and Medical City Dallas – Medical City Fort Worth and Medical City Dallas are 2 of 10 Medical City Healthcare Hospitals to be recognized with an "A" Leapfrog Hospital Safety Grade in 2021. The former is licensed for 348 beds; the latter, 668 beds. Part of the Texas Stroke Institute's Stroke Care Network, the hospitals are designated Comprehensive Stroke Centers and Joint Commission-certified chest pain centers.

===== Satellite campuses =====
- Medical City Weatherford (Weatherford, TX)
- CHRISTUS Spohn Hospital Corpus Christi - Shoreline and Corpus Christi Medical Center (Corpus Christi, TX)
- HCA Houston Healthcare Conroe (Conroe, TX)
- Christus Good Shepherd Medical Center - Longview (Longview, TX)

===== Affiliated foreign teaching hospitals =====
- Daeyang Luke Hospital, Malawi
- School of Medicine, Mae Fah Luang University, Thailand
- Institute of Medicine, Suranaree University of Technology, Thailand

==== Admissions ====
The admissions process is streamlined through Texas Medical & Dental Schools Application Service (TMDSAS), whereby applicants are ranked by schools at which they interview and then "matched" for final placement to a single Texas medical school of their highest preference. Thirteen other medical schools in Texas participate in TMDSAS, including UT Southwestern Medical School and Baylor College of Medicine.

==== ROME Rural Scholars Program ====
TCOM's Rural Osteopathic Medical Education ("ROME") Rural Scholars Program is an innovative educational program designed to prepare medical students for clinical practice in the rural, underserved setting. In addition to completing regular courses in preclinical medicine during their first two years of school, ROME Scholars have additional course requirements pertinent to their curricular focus in rural or international medicine. Core clinical rotations during third year are designed to provide focused training in the rural setting through assignments at designated rural-based training sites located throughout Texas or at affiliated hospitals in Malawi and Thailand.

==== Dual degree programs ====
TCOM also offers the following dual degree programs: B.A./D.O., D.O./M.P.H., D.O./M.S., and D.O./Ph.D.

Through the HSC Scholars in Cancer Research Program, DO/PhD students are able to pursue in-depth, mentored biomedical research training in oncological studies. Scholars enrolled in this program are supported with a stipend (up to $28,000 per year) and travel support (up to $1,000 per year) for up to 3 years. Tuition for medical school is fully covered as well.

==== Rankings ====
Texas College of Osteopathic Medicine has a long record in primary care education. It was ranked among the top 50 medical schools for primary care by U.S. News & World Report from 2002 through 2014, and reached #11 for primary care in the 2023 rankings, the highest placement of any osteopathic school that year. After a 2023 methodology change that replaced most numbered positions with tiers, the 2024 rankings placed TCOM in Tier 1 for primary care, one of only 15 schools nationwide to receive that designation. The 2026 rankings placed the school in Tier 3 for both research and primary care, with additional rankings of #46 for graduates entering primary care and #82 for graduates practicing in health professional shortage areas.

In an annual report by George W. Bush Institute (2020), TCOM was ranked #1 amongst U.S. medical schools for innovation impact productivity, a measure of how well an institution converts research inputs (e.g. research spending) into patents, licenses, startups, widely cited papers, and graduates. The institute ranked the school as the most productive U.S. medical school in impacting its local economy and society through innovation.

==== Graduate medical education ====
TCOM offers many residency training programs and fellowship training programs at affiliated training institutions, including John Peter Smith Hospital and Driscoll Children's Hospital. In partnership with UNTHSC Texas Center for Performing Arts Health, the medical school also offers the nation's first fellowship training program in Performing Arts Medicine.

=== School of Biomedical Sciences ===
The School of Biomedical Sciences, founded in 1993, offers Bachelor of Science, Master of Sciences, and Doctor of Philosophy degrees in several disciplines, such as: biochemistry and cancer biology; biotechnology; cell biology, immunology, and microbiology; clinical research management; forensic genetics; integrative physiology; medical science; genetics; pharmacology and neuroscience; pharmaceutical sciences and pharmacotherapy; structural anatomy and rehabilitation sciences; visual sciences. Academic departments include: Physiology & Anatomy; Microbiology, Immunology, & Genetics; and Pharmacy & Neuroscience.

Post-baccalaureate students may join the Medical Sciences ("Med Sci") Program to improve their credentials for admission to medical, veterinary, or dental school. Students in this 1-year program receive a Masters of Science in Medical Sciences.

==== TechFW Acceleration Lab ====
The TechFW Acceleration Lab opened in 2008 to provide laboratory space for TechFW clients needing wet labs in addition to their offices. The partnership between HSC and TechFW has granted clients of TechFW access to six wet labs and other resources at the university to leverage their development of new medical devices, novel discovery tools for health and pharmaceutical research, and other life science innovations.

=== School of Public Health ===
The School of Public Health, founded in 1999, confers a doctoral professional degree in Public Health Sciences and master's degrees in Public Health, Health Administration, and Public Health Sciences. The school also has graduate certification programs in Public Health and Healthcare Management.

=== School of Health Professions ===
The School of Health Professions, founded in 2004, confers a doctoral professional degree in Physical Therapy (DPT) and master's degrees in Physician Assistant Studies and Lifestyle Health Sciences & Coaching. The school also has a graduate certification program in Genetics and Genomics.

=== UNT System College of Pharmacy ===
Founded in 2011, UNT System College of Pharmacy (HSCCP) is a four-year program that leads to the degree of Doctor of Pharmacy (PharmD). Emphasis is placed upon training students to enter any area of pharmacy practice or pharmacy residency. During the first and second years of the curriculum, a heavy emphasis is placed on foundational courses in the biomedical and pharmaceutical sciences. During the second and third years, integrated pharmacotherapy is taught with an organ system approach.

In 2022, U.S. News & World Report ranked UNT System College of Pharmacy #90 amongst the 134 pharmacy schools participating in its annual rankings.

==== Pharmacy curriculum ====
Clinical case discussions in the first year focus on health promotion and communication skills, and in the second and third years, these discussions align with the pharmacotherapy blocks. Pharmacy Practice Skills Laboratories in Years 1 and 2 focus on medication preparation, patient interviewing and assessment, and professional communication skills. Students participate in Pharmacy Practice courses in Semesters 1 - 6, in which they study a broad range of areas, including biostatistics, health care delivery systems, pharmacoeconomics, law, ethics, history of pharmacy, communications, and more.

During Years 1 - 3, students engage in Introductory Pharmacy Practice Experiences (IPPE's) in which they work with pharmacists or fourth year pharmacy students in community and institutional pharmacies, participate in health promotion projects in the community, take Basic Life Support and Advanced Cardiac Life Support classes, and perform simulations on high fidelity manikins. IPPE's emphasize interprofessional collaboration with other health professions students at HSC. In the fourth year, students engage in Advanced Pharmacy Practice Experiences (APPE's), in which they provide patient assessment and care through medication management, provide drug information to patients, providers, and other health care professionals, engage in disease management and prevention, and engage in medication distribution through filling of prescriptions and medication orders, all under the direction of a licensed pharmacist preceptor.

==== Multidisciplinary programs ====
Dual degree programs offered include PharmD/MS, PharmD/PhD, and PharmD/MPH. Students are alternatively able to pursue special curricular emphases, such as Emphasis in Pharmacometrics or Emphasis in Pharmacy Compounding, and/or certifications in Applied Health Outcomes Research, Pharmacometrics, and Drug Discovery & Development.

== Campus ==
UNT Health Science Center's campus has grown from a few offices on the fifth floor of the Fort Worth Osteopathic Hospital into a 33.5-acre campus with 20 buildings and two parking garages. Supported by state funds and private donations, the institution purchased land east of the osteopathic hospital along Camp Bowie Boulevard to form a permanent campus in 1972. The first Campus Master Plan, crafted in 1972, created a vision for these sites, which included an academic building immediately east of the osteopathic hospital that was connected to a library, student union, and student housing. After the Health Pavilion (HP) opened in 1997, patient visits burgeoned in the academic health science center. Today, HSC is located on a 33.5-acre campus in the Cultural District of Fort Worth, TX. Within a three-mile radius from campus, there are four major hospitals concentrated into what is known as the Fort Worth Medical Center.

One of the most visible results of the subsequent Campus Master Plan, crafted in 2007, was the demolition of Fort Worth Osteopathic Hospital and its subsequent replacement with the Medical Education & Training Building (MET), the new academic center of campus. The 2007 plan also identified the construction site for the Interdisciplinary Research and Education Building (IREB), which opened in 2018. The 2018 Campus Master Plan, the most recent institutional roadmap, shows potential at full build-out for over 2.3 million gross square feet of space.

The Gibson D. Lewis Health Science Library's collections, which include more than 20,000 journal titles and 67,000 books, provide HSC students and faculty with access to the latest basic science and clinical research.

=== HSC Regional Simulation Center ===
In June 2022, HSC unveils its Immersive Regional Simulation Center, which will be located on the first floor of the Gibson D. Lewis Library. As a collaborative training hub for residency program trainees, clinical staff, emergency medical service providers, nursing home staffers, and HSC students, the $6.75 million facility will enable clinical programs within the region to incorporate virtual reality into their health care curriculum.

The HSC Regional Simulation Center will house 14 clinic exam rooms; a large, changeable procedural skills suite; an "activities of daily living" suite resembling the inside of a home; several multipurpose "teams" rooms; and several learning lounges, where students can study. Many of the rooms will be capable of being resized, remodeled, and adapted based on the needs of students and veteran health care workers.

== Research ==
Major areas of research at UNT Health Fort Worth include health disparities, ophthalmology, forensics, and healthy aging.

The Center for Human Identification's accredited forensic laboratory provides genetic and anthropological examinations for criminal casework and missing persons identification, local CODIS operations, and development. The North Texas Eye Research Institute (NTERI), which opened in 1992, seeks to develop new treatments for eye disorders such as glaucoma, macular degeneration, and optic neuritis.

UNT Health's Center for Health Disparities idenitfies health disparities through research and seeks to correct them through training and community outreach. In 2021, the Center for Health Disparities received a $50 million award from the National Institutes of Health to lead the coordinating center for the AI/Machine Learning Consortium to Advance Health Equity and Researcher Diversity (AIM-AHEAD) program. AIM-AHEAD seeks to apply AI and machine-learning to health records and other medical data in order to figure out novel ways of addressing health disparities.

In 2020, as part of the National Institutes of Health's efforts to study the biology of Alzheimer's disease among different racial and ethnic groups, the UNT Health Institute for Translational Research received a $45 million grant from the National Institute on Aging. In October 2022, the Health Institute for Translational Research received another grant for $148 million in order to continue doing this research. In 2026, the Institute for Translational Research joined the NIH-supported Alzheimer's Biomarker Consortium–Down Syndrome study, becoming its first site in Texas and one of 11 sites nationally; UNT Health was awarded about $6.8 million for the work, which investigates why adults with Down syndrome have a markedly elevated lifetime risk of Alzheimer's disease.

=== Research Institutes ===
- Research centers and institutes at UNTHSC include:
- Center for Human Identification
- North Texas Eye Research Institute
- Institute for Health Disparities
- Institute for Translational Research
- Center for Anatomical Sciences
- Sensory Research Institute

== Notable alumni, faculty and staff ==
- Ronald R. Blanck — former president; current chairman of the board of the Uniformed Services University of the Health Sciences
- Tecora Ballom, DO. MPH, MS, — Rear Admiral retired United States Public Health Service, former United States Assistant Surgeon General
- Rob Dickerman — neurosurgeon
- Scott Ransom — former president; current researcher at Harvard University and principal at Ransom Capital & Advisory LLC; former partner at McKinsey & Company, PwC|Strategy& and Oliver Wyman
- J. D. Sheffield — physician in Gatesville, Texas and Republican member of the Texas House of Representatives from District 59 in Coryell County
- David Siderovski — chair of Department of Pharmacology & Neuroscience
- Michael R. Williams — president
