= Michael R. Williams =

American physician

5th Chancellor of the University of North Texas System
- Incumbent
- Assumed office January 1, 2022
- Preceded by: Lesa Roe

6th President of the University of North Texas Health Science Center
- In office July 12, 2013 – January 1, 2022
- Preceded by: Dr. Scott B. Ransom
- Succeeded by: Sylvia Trent-Adams

Personal details
- Education: Texas Wesleyan University (BS); Texas College of Osteopathic Medicine (DO)
- Occupation: physician
- Website: Office of the Chancellor

Michael R. Williams is an American physician who has served as the 5th chancellor of the University of North Texas System since 2022. He previously served as the sixth president of the University of North Texas Health Science Center from 2013 to 2022.

Williams was named to the President of the University of North Texas Health Science Center at Fort Worth (HSC) in 2013 by the University of North Texas System Board of Regents to succeed Scott Ransom. Williams practiced anesthesiology and critical care medicine in Texas for more than 20 years. Williams was CEO of Hill Country Memorial Hospital in Fredericksburg, Texas. Hill Country Memorial received a Best Practices award from the judges of the Malcolm Baldrige National Quality Award in 2013. Williams also was on the UNT System Board of Regents.

== Education ==
Williams earned his bachelor's degree in biology from Texas Wesleyan University in 1977 and his Doctor of Osteopathic Medicine (D.O.) degree from the University of North Texas Health Science Center in 1981. He then completed his residency in general surgery at Methodist Dallas Medical Center and anesthesiology/critical care at Parkland Memorial Hospital where he was chief resident.

Williams holds an M.B.A. degree from Duke University and a master's degree in Health Care Management from Harvard University. He has an M.D. degree from Ross University School of Medicine.

Academic offices
Preceded by Scott Ransom	President of University of North Texas Health Science Center; 2013-2022	Succeeded by Sylvia Trent-Adams
