= Ronald R. Blanck =

Surgeon General of the US Army (born 1941)

Ronald Ray Blanck
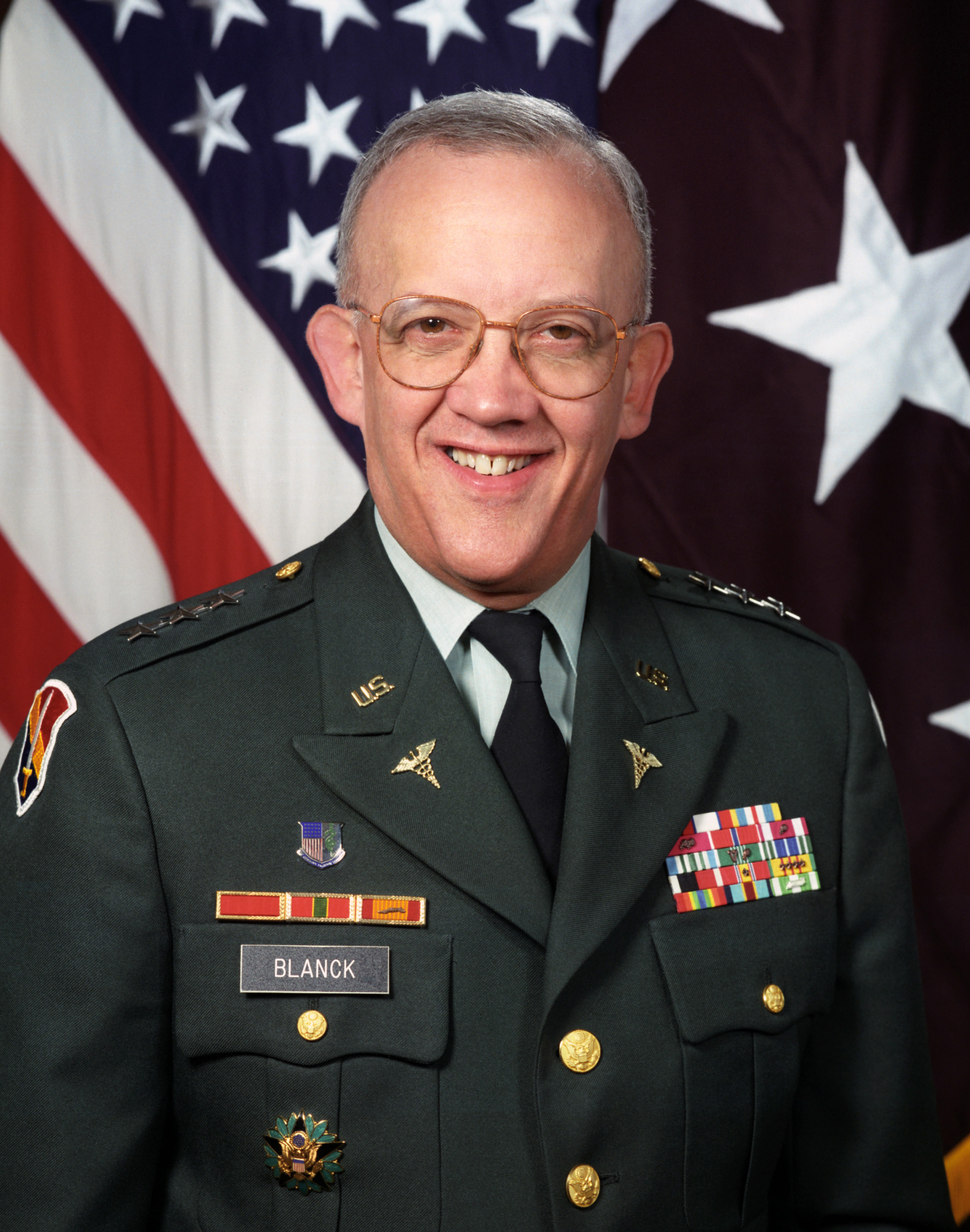
- Born: October 8, 1941 (age 84); Lancaster, Pennsylvania, U.S.
- Education: Juniata College; Philadelphia College of Osteopathic Medicine
- Military career
- Allegiance: United States of America
- Branch: United States Army
- Service years: 1968–2000
- Rank: Lieutenant General
- Commands: Surgeon General of the United States Army
- Conflicts: Vietnam War; Cold War
- Awards: Distinguished Service Medal; Defense Superior Service Medal; Legions of Merit (3); Bronze Star Medal

Lt. Gen. (Ret.) Ronald Ray Blanck, D.O. (born October 8, 1941) was the 39th Surgeon General of the United States Army, from 1996 to 2000. He is a Doctor of Osteopathic Medicine (D.O.) and is the first osteopathic physician ever appointed Surgeon General of the Army. He was also president of the University of North Texas Health Science Center at Fort Worth from 2000 to 2006. He is the former chairman of the board of regents of the Uniformed Services University of the Health Sciences.

== Early life and education ==
Blanck was born in Lancaster, Pennsylvania, on October 8, 1941. He is a graduate of Juniata College and the Philadelphia College of Osteopathic Medicine and is board certified in internal medicine.

== Career ==
=== Military career ===
He began his military career in 1968 as a medical officer and battalion surgeon in the Vietnam War. He retired 32 years later as the Surgeon General of the U.S. Army and commander of the U.S. Army Medical Command, with more than 46,000 military personnel and 26,000 civilian employees throughout the world.

During his military career, he also served as commander of Walter Reed Army Medical Center; first commander of the North Atlantic Region Medical Command; and Director of Professional Services and Chief of Medical Corps Affairs for the U.S. Army Surgeon General. Other assignments included Assistant Dean of Student Affairs at the Uniformed Services University School of Medicine; Chief of the Department of Medicine at Brooke Army Medical Center; Commander, Berlin Army Hospital; and Commander, Frankfurt Regional Army Medical Center.

=== Academia ===
He has held teaching positions at Georgetown University, George Washington University, Howard University College of Medicine, the Uniformed Services University of the Health Sciences, the University of Texas Health Science Center at San Antonio, and the University of North Texas Health Science Center.

He joined the UNT Health Science Center in August 2000 after his retirement from the U.S. Army and served as president until June 30, 2006. As president, he headed an academic health center that includes the Texas College of Osteopathic Medicine, Graduate School of Biomedical Sciences, School of Public Health and School of Health Professions.

=== Private sector ===
He is a partner and Chairman of the Board of Martin, Blanck & Associates. The company, formerly Martin & Associates, does health care consulting for the private sector and the government. He is consulted as an advisor on bioterrorism issues and an expert in preparing the medical community to respond to mass casualty incidents or those involving weapons of mass destruction. He chaired task forces on bioterrorism for both the Texas Medical Association and the American Osteopathic Association.

=== Honors and recognition ===
His military honors include Distinguished Service Medals, the Defense Superior Service Medal, the Legions of Merit, the Bronze Star Medal, Meritorious Service Medal and Army Commendation Medals.

In 2000, the American Medical Association honored him with its highest award for government officials, the Dr. Nathan Davis Award.

He is past governor of the American College of Physicians/American Society of Internal Medicine and was named a Master by the society.

He is past chair of the United States Department of Veterans Affairs' National Research Advisory Council, past member and chair of the Educational Commission for Foreign Medical Graduates (ECFMG), past chair of the board of managers of the Association of Military Surgeons of the United States and past chair of Tenax Therapeutics, Inc. He is currently on the board of the Henry M. Jackson Foundation for the Advancement of Military Medicine as well as the board of Operative Experience, Inc.

In late 2022, he was selected to be the interim president of the Foundation for Advancement of International Medical Education and Research (FAIMER), a member of Intealth, and a partner of ECFMG.

== Personal ==
In the 2024 United States presidential election, Blanck endorsed Kamala Harris.

Preceded by Lt. Gen. Alcide M. Lanoue	Surgeon General of the United States Army; October, 1996– September 22, 2000	Succeeded by Lt. Gen. James B. Peake

Preceded by David M. Richards	President of University of North Texas Health Science Center; 2000-2006	Succeeded by Scott B. Ransom
