= University of North Texas System =

Public university system in Dallas, Texas, U.S.

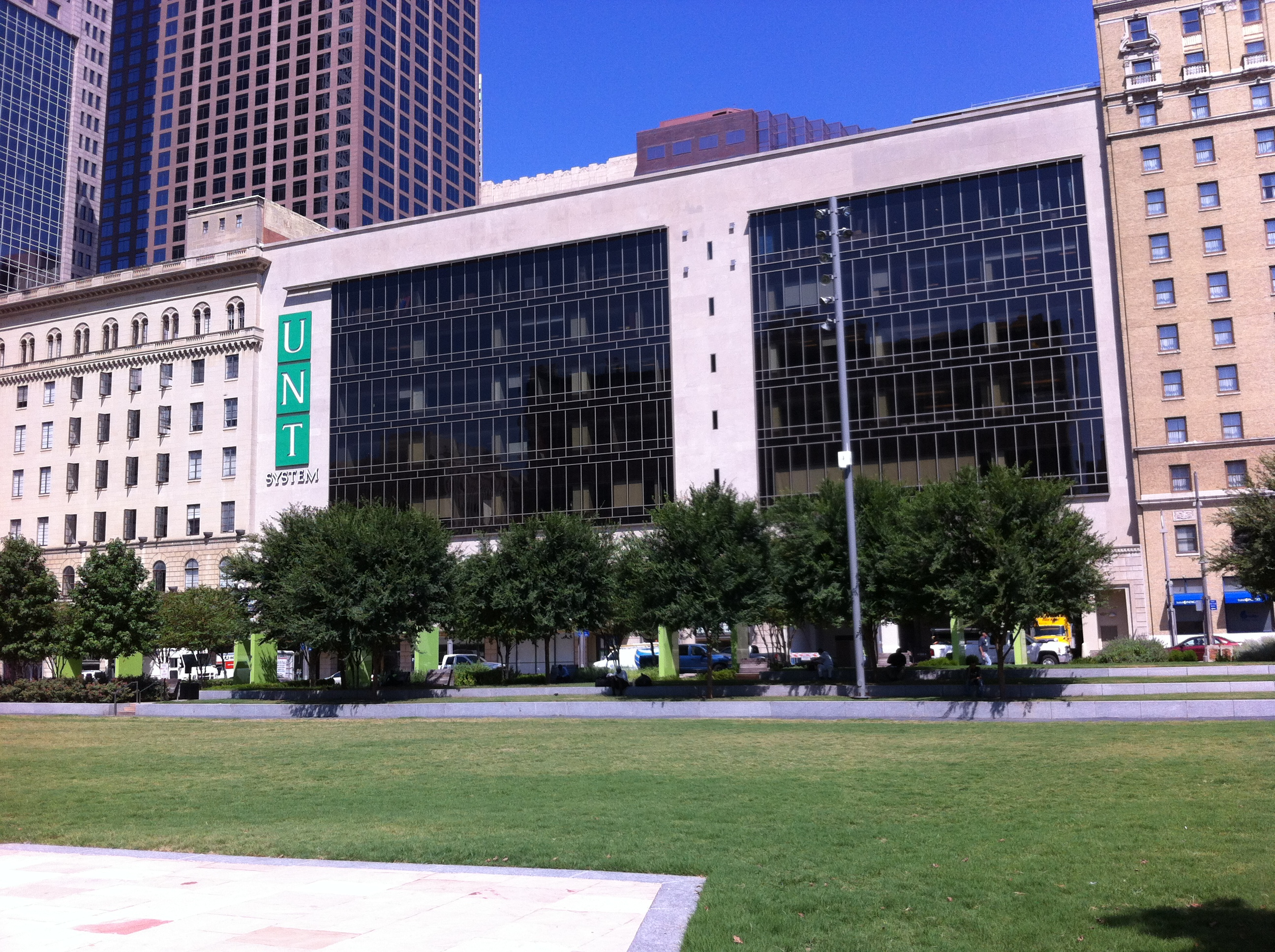
- The University of North Texas's headquarters in Dallas
- Type: Public university system
- Established: 1890 (forerunner institution founded); 1980 (system created); 2003 (system formalized)
- Chairperson: Carlos Munguia
- Chancellor: Michael R. Williams (2022–present)
- Students: 53,682 (as of 2025)
- Location: Dallas, Texas, U.S. 32°46′54″N 96°47′43″W
- Campus: UNT System (Dallas) UNT (Denton) UNT Health Science Center (Fort Worth) UNT Dallas
- Colors: Green and white
- Website: www.untsystem.edu

University of North Texas System Locations.

The University of North Texas System is a public university system headquartered in Dallas, Texas, United States. It is the administrative overseer of three otherwise autonomous Texas institutions of higher learning: the University of North Texas, a research institution based in Denton; the University of North Texas Health Science Center in Fort Worth; and the University of North Texas at Dallas in South and Downtown Dallas.

== History ==
The UNT Regents initially created the system in 1980 to optimize management with the Texas College of Osteopathic Medicine, which, 5 years earlier (September 1, 1975) became part of UNT by way of merger. As a reflection of growth, the UNT System was formalized in 2003 by the 78th Texas Legislature.

== Constituent institutions ==
=== University of North Texas ===
The University of North Texas (UNT), the System's flagship institution, a four-year general education university in Denton, Texas. As of Fall 2023, UNT has 46,940 students. Their athletic program competes in the American Conference as part of the NCAA Division I.

=== University of North Texas Health Science Center ===
The University of North Texas Health Science Center (UNTHSC) is primarily a graduate-level institution which includes the Texas College of Osteopathic Medicine (TCOM), the School of Biomedical Sciences, the School of Public Health, the School of Health Professions, the UNT System College of Pharmacy, and the School of Nursing. UNTHSC started its first bachelors program in 2022.

=== University of North Texas at Dallas ===
The University of North Texas at Dallas (formerly known as the System Center and UNT Dallas Campus) is a university established as a branch campus of the University of North Texas in 2000. In April 2009, the Texas Higher Education Coordinating Board certified this enrollment and granted UNT Dallas status as an independent general academic institution. Now, the freestanding school is known as the University of North Texas at Dallas, the first public university within Dallas city limits. Freshmen and sophomores were admitted for the first time in the fall of 2010. Initially operated as a unit within the UNT System, the University of North Texas at Dallas College of Law was founded in the fall of 2014, and was realigned within UNT Dallas on September 1, 2015. Their athletic program competes in the Red River Athletic Conference as a part of the NAIA.

=== University of North Texas New College at Frisco ===
UNT opened the Frisco satellite campus in Spring 2016. Undergraduate programs include criminal justice, sports management and, strategic corporate communication; MBAs are also available at this campus.

== Board of regents ==
The system is governed by the University of North Texas Board of Regents, whose members are appointed by the governor to serve six-year terms. The system added its first student regent—a one-year appointment that does not carry voting rights—in February 2006.

== Chancellors ==
- 1980–1981: Frank Vandiver was appointed president and chancellor July 1980, making him UNT's eleventh president and first chancellor. He resigned August 27, 1981, to accept the presidency of Texas A&M University. The Chancellor's post, at that time, oversaw the University of North Texas and University of North Texas Health Science Center. The position for a Chancellor was created by the UNT Board of Regents in 1980 and the system was formalized in 2003 by the 78th Texas Legislature. Vandiver's thirteen-month tenure in the dual role as president and chancellor is the shortest of either in the one hundred and thirty-six-year history of UNT.
- 1982–2002: Alfred Hurley was appointed president and chancellor on February 1, 1982, making him UNT's twelfth president and second chancellor. He stepped down as president of UNT in October 2000 to become the system's first full-time chancellor. Hurley stepped down as Chancellor on August 31, 2002. He is currently Emeritus Chancellor. Hurley had previously served 30 years in the U.S. Air Force, where, from 1966 to 1980, he headed the History Department at the Air Force Academy and served as chairman of its Humanities Division.

His tenures as president, eighteen years, and chancellor, twenty years, are the longest of either position in the histories of UNT and the UNT System. In August 2002, the Regents renamed UNT Administration Building—currently seventy years old—in honor of Alfred F. and Johanna H. Hurley.

- 2002–2017: Lee F. Jackson served the UNT System as Chancellor from September 1, 2002, to October 6, 2017.He was appointed Chancellor of the University of North Texas System after a 30-year career in government in Dallas and the State of Texas. Jackson began his career in the Dallas City Manager's Office, served 10 years in the Texas House of Representatives, and was elected four times as Dallas County Judge, chief elected official in the state's second largest county. He received many awards for regional leadership, initiated new programs in juvenile justice, air quality, and transportation, and helped establish the Sixth Floor Museum in downtown Dallas which examines the legacy of President John F. Kennedy and the events surrounding his assassination there in 1963.
- 2017-2022: Lesa Roe served as the UNT chancellor from 2017 to 2022. Roe came to the university system after serving as Acting Deputy Director of the National Aeronautics and Space Administration. Roe served 32 years at NASA in various leadership roles including Deputy Associate Administrator, Deputy Director and Director of NASA's Langley Research Center
- 2022–present: Michael R. Williams, D.O., president of University of North Texas System's Health Science Center (HSC) at Fort Worth since 2013 was named System Chancellor in 2022. Dr. Williams practiced anesthesiology and critical care medicine in Texas for more than 20 years and is an experienced business executive and entrepreneur. Dr. Williams previously served on the Board of Regents at the UNT System and Texas Wesleyan University.
