= Robert M. Lightfoot Jr. =

American space agency executive

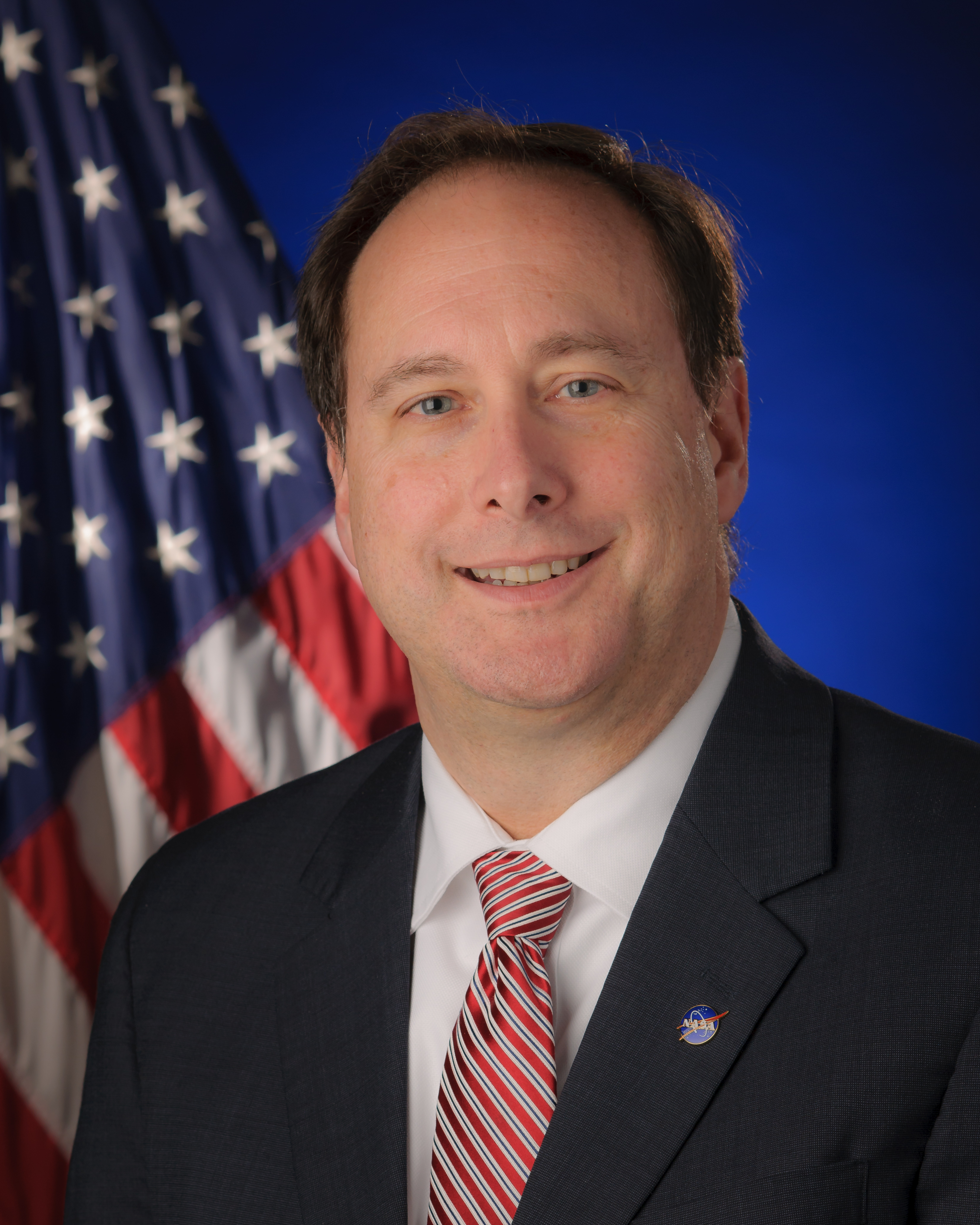
- Official portrait, 2017

Acting Administrator of the National Aeronautics and Space Administration
- In office January 20, 2017 – April 23, 2018
- President: Donald Trump
- Deputy: Lesa Roe (acting)
- Preceded by: Charles Bolden
- Succeeded by: Jim Bridenstine

Associate Administrator of the National Aeronautics and Space Administration
- In office September 25, 2012 – April 30, 2018
- President: Barack Obama; Donald Trump
- Deputy: Lesa Roe; Krista Paquin
- Succeeded by: Steve Jurczyk

Personal details
- Born: Montevallo, Alabama, U.S.
- Spouse: Caroline Smith
- Education: University of Alabama (BS)
- Website: NASA Biography

Robert M. Lightfoot Jr. is a former acting administrator of the National Aeronautics and Space Administration (NASA), serving from January 20, 2017 until April 23, 2018. Succeeding Charles Bolden, Lightfoot became the space agency's acting associate administrator on March 5, 2012. That job became permanent on September 25, 2012. He had previously served as the eleventh director of the NASA Marshall Space Flight Center in Huntsville, Alabama, from March 2009 until his promotion in March 2012. On March 12, 2018, he announced his retirement from NASA effective April 30, 2018.

== Early life ==
Lightfoot has a bachelor's degree in mechanical engineering from the University of Alabama. In October 2007, he was named Distinguished Departmental Fellow for the University of Alabama, Department of Mechanical Engineering and selected as a University of Alabama College of Engineering fellow in 2009. Lightfoot serves on the University of Alabama Mechanical Engineering Advisory Board.

== Career ==
Lightfoot joined NASA in 1989 as a test engineer and program manager at Marshall. In 1998, he was named deputy division chief of Marshall's propulsion test division. Lightfoot moved to NASA's John C. Stennis Space Center in 1999 as chief of propulsion test operations. In 2001, he was named deputy director of the Propulsion Test Directorate at Stennis and in March 2002 he was promoted to director.

From 2003 to 2005, Lightfoot served as assistant associate administrator for the Space Shuttle Program in the Office of Space Operations at NASA Headquarters in Washington, D.C. He returned to Marshall in 2005 as manager of the Space Shuttle Propulsion Office. In 2007, Lightfoot was named deputy director of Marshall where he shared responsibility for managing the center. He served in that capacity until becoming acting director on March 26, 2009, after the retirement of the previous director, David A. King. Lightfoot was formally named as the eleventh director of the Marshall Space Flight Center on August 24, 2009. He led Marshall through the transition from the Shuttle era to the Space Launch System.

In February 2012, NASA announced that Lightfoot would become the space agency's acting Associate Administrator as of March 5, 2012. The position opened when Chris Scolese was named the new director of the Goddard Space Flight Center in Greenbelt, Maryland. Lightfoot's successor at Marshall was Arthur E. "Gene" Goldman, named as acting director in March 2012. Lightfoot shifted from acting to permanent Associate Administrator on September 25, 2012.

In 2018, Lightfoot was elected as a fellow of the National Academy of Public Administration.

On March 12, 2018, Lightfoot announced that he would be retiring from the agency on April 30, 2018.

In July 2018, Lightfoot joined the Advisory Board of Firefly Aerospace.

In April 2019, Lightfoot joined Lockheed Martin as the Executive Vice President of its Space division.

== Awards and honors ==
A native of Montevallo, Alabama, Lightfoot has received several awards during his career, including the Presidential Rank Award for Meritorious Executives in 2006 and a NASA Outstanding Leadership Medal in 2007 for "outstanding and exemplary leadership of the Shuttle Propulsion Office" and "assuring safety for the shuttle's return to flight".

Government offices
Preceded by	Associate Administrator of NASA; 2012–2018	Succeeded by Stephen Jurczyk; Acting
Preceded by Charles Bolden	Administrator of NASA; Acting; 2017–2018	Succeeded by Jim Bridenstine
