= University of North Texas Center for Human Identification =

The University of North Texas Center for Human Identification is a national resource for the identification of missing and unidentified persons at the University of North Texas Health Science Center. UNTCHI combines the services of a forensic DNA laboratory, a forensic anthropology laboratory, and the Forensic Services Unit (FSU). The center operates the National Missing and Unidentified Persons System (NamUs) and Project EDAN ("Everyone Deserves A Name") which helps identify human remains.

== History and activities ==
The UNT Center for Human Identification (UNTCHI) was created in 2004 and consists of the Laboratory for Molecular Identification, the Laboratory of Forensic Anthropology, and the Forensic Services Unit. Founded in 1986, the Laboratory of Forensic Anthropology provides anthropological analysis of human remains for law enforcement and medicolegal agencies as well as other publicly supported entities, such as public defenders and district attorneys. UNTCHI analyzes DNA samples from both unidentified remains as well as reference samples submitted by family members of missing persons to law enforcement agencies nationwide. It also conducts all DNA analysis for the National Center for Missing and Exploited Children. The center is one of less than a dozen laboratories in the United States capable of mitochondrial DNA evaluation and is the largest single contributor to the Combined DNA Index System (CODIS), a database for unidentified missing person cases. The Center is the only academic center in the U.S. with access to the FBI’s next-generation CODIS 6.0 DNA Software. In 2011, UNTCHI began managing and developing the National Missing and Unidentified Persons System (NamUs) for the U.S. Department of Justice.

In addition to providing investigators with important information regarding cases, the anthropological data are used to refine molecular analyses within the CODIS system. This collaboration has created a unique resource for the identification of missing persons and unidentified remains, and is available to law enforcement agencies and medicolegal entities charged with the investigation of death across the nation. Additional support is also available to agencies through the Center's Forensic Services Unit. The center also provides training to scientists worldwide on identifying human remains, from Malaysia, Thailand, India, the Middle East, South Africa, Mexico, and Libya. The center operates with funding from the National Institute of Justice.
