= Roy D. Bridges Jr. =

American astronaut and USAF general (born 1943)

Roy Bridges
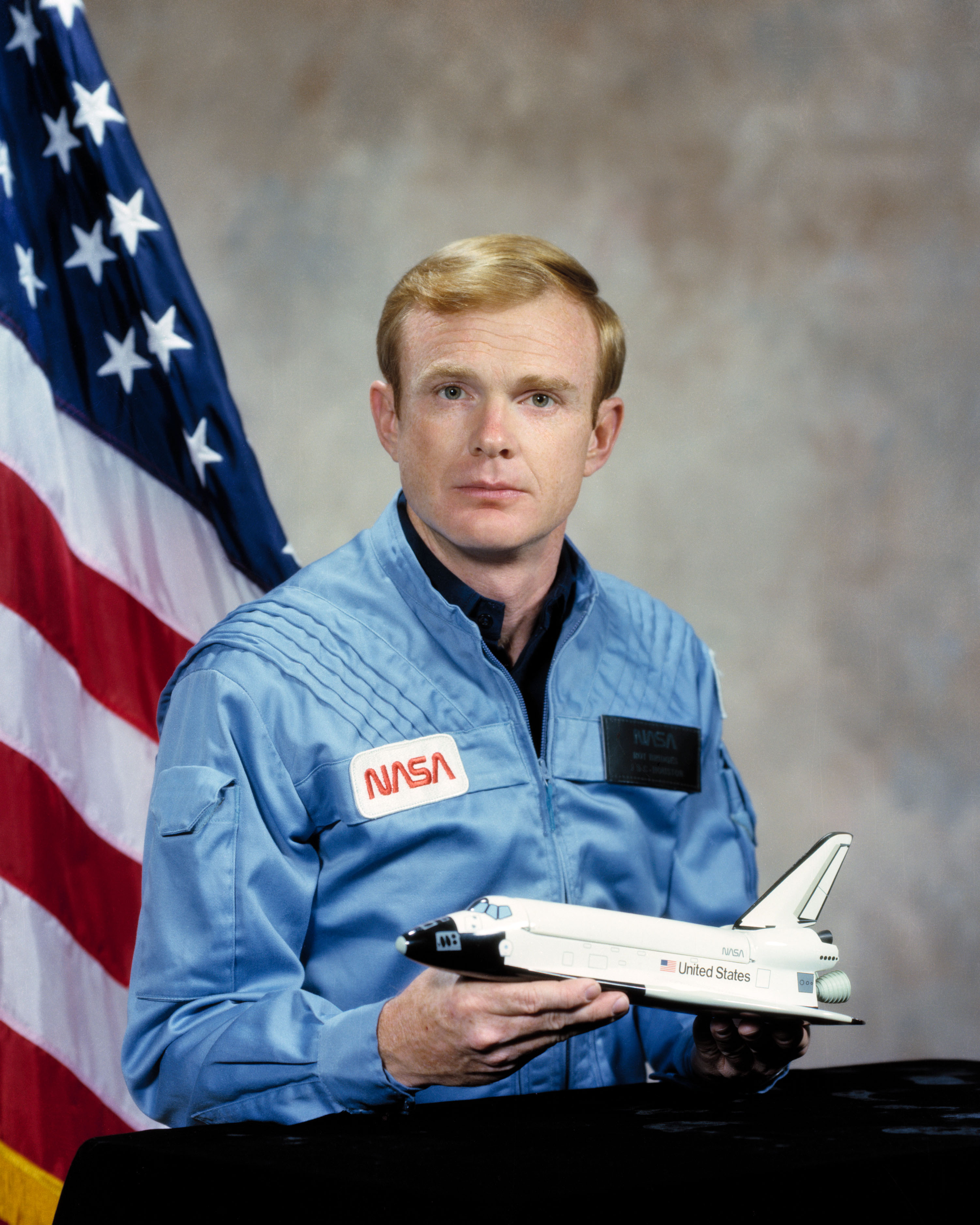

Director of the Langley Research Center
- In office June 13, 2003 – October 3, 2005
- President: George W. Bush
- Preceded by: Delma Freeman (Acting)
- Succeeded by: Lesa Roe

Personal details
- Born: Roy Dubard Bridges Jr. July 19, 1943 (age 83) Atlanta, Georgia, U.S.
- Education: United States Air Force Academy (BS); Purdue University (MS)
- Space career

NASA astronaut
- Rank: Major General, USAF
- Time in space: 7d 22h 45m
- Selection: NASA Group 9 (1980)
- Missions: STS-51-F; STS-61-F (never flew)
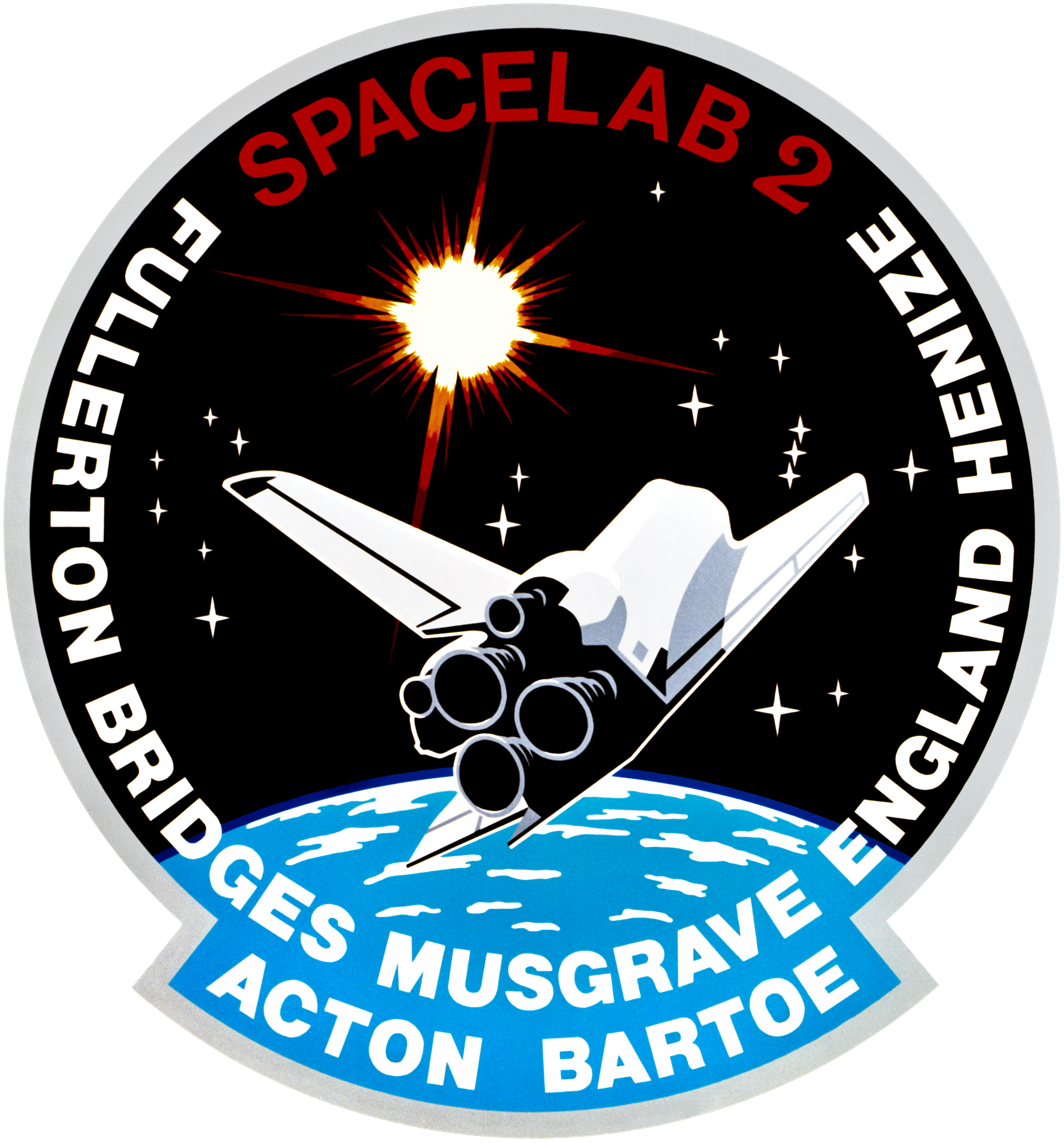
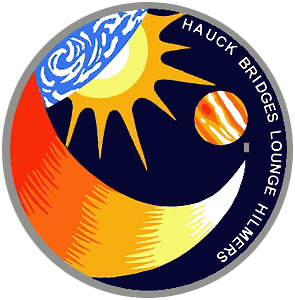
- Mission insignia

Roy Dubard Bridges Jr. (born July 19, 1943) is an American pilot, engineer, retired United States Air Force officer, test pilot, former NASA astronaut and the former director of NASA's John F. Kennedy Space Center and Langley Research Center. As a command pilot, he has over 4,460 flying hours, and is a decorated veteran of 262 combat missions during the Vietnam War. He retired as a major general in the U.S. Air Force, last serving as the Director of Requirements, Headquarters Air Force Materiel Command, Wright-Patterson Air Force Base, Ohio, from June 1993 until his retirement. He is married with two adult children.

== Early life and education ==
Born July 19, 1943, in Atlanta, Bridges grew up in Gainesville, Georgia, and graduated from Gainesville High School in 1961. He was active in the Boy Scouts of America, where he achieved its second-highest rank, Life Scout. He is a distinguished graduate of the United States Air Force Academy, earning a Bachelor of Science degree in engineering science in 1965. He received a Master of Science degree in astronautics from Purdue University in 1966.

== NASA career ==
Bridges served as a NASA astronaut, piloting the Space Shuttle Challenger on mission STS-51-F (July 29 to August 6, 1985).

Bridges became the Director of NASA's Langley Research Center in 2003, after serving as Director of the John F. Kennedy Space Center (KSC). He retired from Langley and from NASA at the end of 2005. As the senior management official of the laboratory employing approximately 2,100 NASA civil service and 1,800 contractor personnel, Bridges was responsible for the center's aeronautical and space research programs, as well as facilities, personnel, and administration. In that capacity, he was responsible for managing facilities and activities related to the processing and launch of the Space Shuttle, processing and integration of Shuttle payloads and those aboard Expendable Launch Vehicles (ELVs), as well as final tests and preparation of elements delivered to the International Space Station via Shuttle. He was also responsible for managing the acquisition and launch of all NASA ELV missions.

As Director of the Kennedy Space Center for over six years, Bridges was responsible for managing NASA's only site for processing and launch of the Space Shuttle vehicle; processing the payloads flown on both the Shuttle and expendable launch vehicles; and overseeing expendable vehicle launches carrying NASA payloads. He managed a team of about 2,000 NASA civil servants and about 14,000 contractors.

== Military career ==
Bridges, a decorated veteran of 262 combat missions during Vietnam War, is a retired U.S. Air Force major general who served as the director of requirements, Headquarters Air Force Materiel Command, Wright-Patterson Air Force Base, Ohio, from June 1993 until his retirement July 1, 1996. In that position he served as the Command focal point for product management policy, processes and resources.

Prior to his assignment at Wright-Patterson Air Force Base, Bridges was the commander, Air Force Flight Test Center, at Edwards Air Force Base, California. He has served in several key leadership positions including deputy chief of staff, test and resources, Headquarters Air Force Systems Command, Andrews Air Force Base, Maryland; commander, Eastern Space and Missile Center, Patrick Air Force Base, Florida; commander, 6510th Test Wing, Edwards Air Force Base, California.

In the course of his career he has completed the following assignments:

=== Assignments ===
- June 1965 to January 1966, student, Purdue University, Indiana
- March 1966, student, pilot training, Williams Air Force Base, Arizona
- March 1967, F-100 pilot, 524th Tactical Fighter Squadron, Cannon Air Force Base, New Mexico
- December 1968, F-100 pilot, 416th Tactical Fighter Squadron and Commando Sabre Operation (Misty), Phu Cat Air Base, Republic of Vietnam
- January 1970, T-37 instructor pilot, 3575th Pilot Training Squadron, Vance Air Force Base, Oklahoma
- July 1970, student, United States Air Force Aerospace Research Pilot School, Edwards Air Force Base, California
- July 1971, test pilot, Air Force Flight Test Center, Edwards AFB
- August 1975, distinguished graduate, Air Command and Staff College, Maxwell Air Force Base, Alabama
- June 1976, F-15 and A-10 program element monitor, Headquarters U.S. Air Force, Washington, D.C.
- July 1979, Special Assistant to the Deputy Chief of Staff, Research, Development, and Acquisition, Headquarters U.S. Air Force, Washington, D.C.
- November 1979, assistant director of Plans, Detachment 3, Air Force Flight Test Center, Nellis Air Force Base, Nevada
- July 1980, Astronaut, Johnson Space Center, Houston, Texas
- May 1986, commander of 6510th Test Wing, Edwards AFB
- March 1989, commander of Eastern Space and Missile Center, Patrick Air Force Base, Florida
- January 1990, deputy chief of staff, test and resources, Headquarters Air Force Systems Command, Andrews Air Force Base, Maryland
- August 1991, commander of Air Force Flight Test Center, Edwards AFB
- June 1993, director of requirements, Headquarters Air Force Materiel Command, Wright-Patterson Air Force Base, Ohio
- July 1, 1996, retired.

=== Effective dates of promotion ===
Promotions
Insignia	Rank	Date
	Major general	January 1, 1993
	Brigadier general	July 1, 1990
	Colonel	December 1, 1983
	Lieutenant colonel	August 10, 1979
	Major	November 19, 1973
	Captain	June 13, 1968
	First lieutenant	December 9, 1966
	Second lieutenant	June 9, 1965

=== Awards and decorations ===
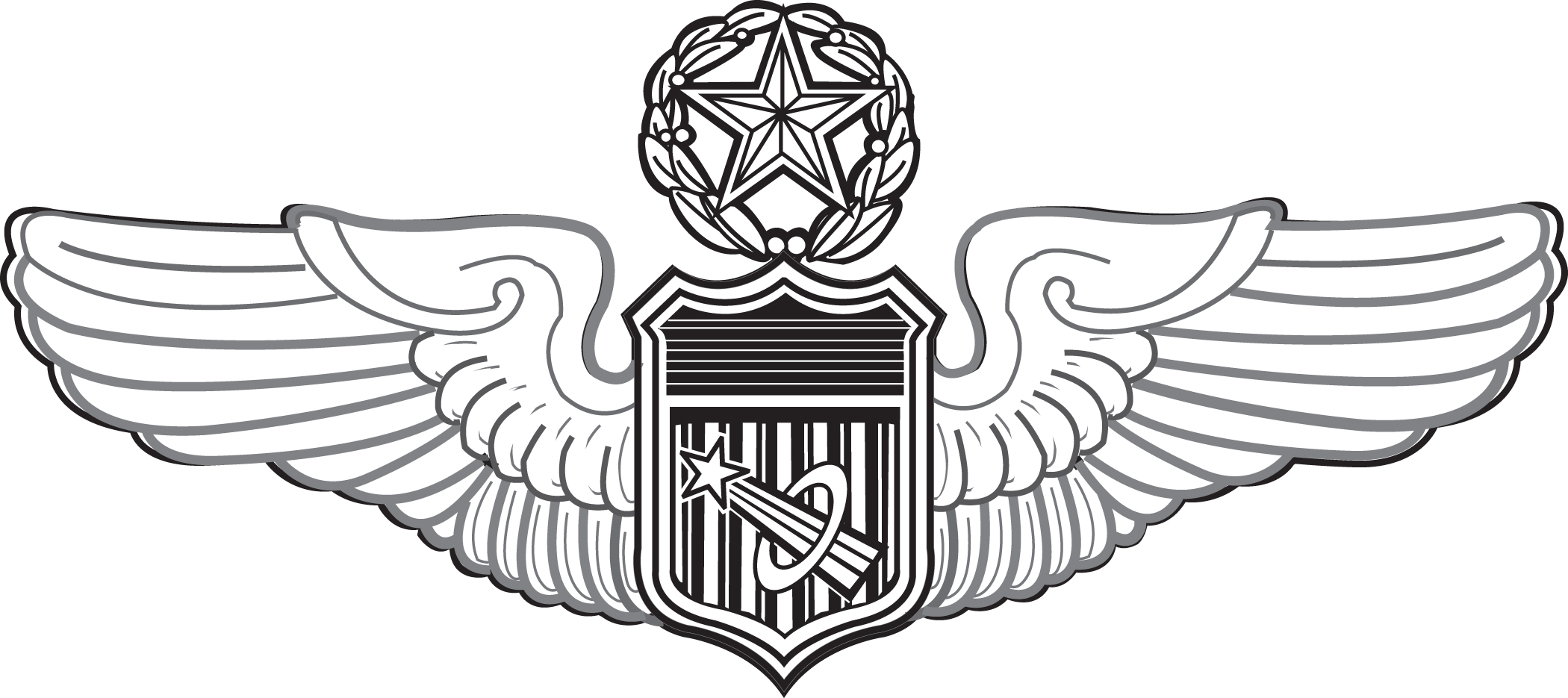
USAF Master Astronaut badge
United States Air Force Parachutist badge

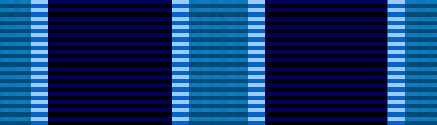
Air Force Distinguished Service ribbon
US Defense Superior Service Medal with 1 OLC
Legion of Merit ribbon with 1 OLC
Distinguished Flying Cross ribbon with 2 OLC
Meritorious Service ribbon
Air Medal with 14 OLC
Air Force Commendation ribbon
NASA Outstanding Leadership ribbon
Space Flight ribbon
AF Presidential Unit Citation ribbon
Outstanding Unit ribbon with 2 OLC
Organizational Excellence ribbon with 1 OLC
National Defense Service Medal with 1 OLC
Vietnam Service ribbon with 3 Service Stars
Air Force Overseas Short Tour Service ribbon
Air Force Longevity Service ribbon with 6 OLC
USAF Marksmanship ribbon
Air Force Training ribbon
Vietnam Gallantry Cross Unit Award
Vietnam Campaign Medal ribbon

He is the recipient of several awards and honors including recognition as a distinguished graduate of Air Force Pilot Training and a top graduate of the U.S. Air Force Test Pilot School, the Presidential Meritorious Executive Award, and a NASA Certificate of Commendation. He is a member of the Georgia Aviation Hall of Fame.

== Personal life ==
Bridges is married to the former Benita Louise Allbaugh of Tucson, Arizona. They have two adult children.

Bridges is an executive with Northrop Grumman Technical Services.
