= Texas Wesleyan University =

Methodist university in Fort Worth, Texas, US

Coordinates: 32.733°N 97.280°W

- Former names: Polytechnic College (1890–1914); Texas Woman's College (1914–1934); Texas Wesleyan College (1934–1989)
- Motto: Scientia Pietasque Vitalis (Latin)
- Motto in English: Knowledge and Vital Piety
- Type: Private university
- Established: 1890; 136 years ago
- Religious affiliation: United Methodist Church
- Academic affiliations: NAICU; IAMSCU
- Endowment: $78.4 million (2024)
- President: Emily W. Messer
- Provost: Hector A. Quintanilla
- Faculty: 304
- Students: 2,666
- Undergraduates: 1,977
- Postgraduates: 689
- Location: Fort Worth, Texas, U.S.
- Campus: Urban, 75 acres (30 ha)
- Colors: Blue & gold
- Nickname: Rams
- Sporting affiliations: NAIA – Sooner
- Mascots: Willie and Wilma the Rams
- Website: www.txwes.edu

Texas Wesleyan University is a private Methodist university in Fort Worth, Texas. It was founded in 1890 by the Methodist Episcopal Church, South. The main campus is located in the Polytechnic Heights neighborhood of Fort Worth. Its mascot is the ram.

== History ==
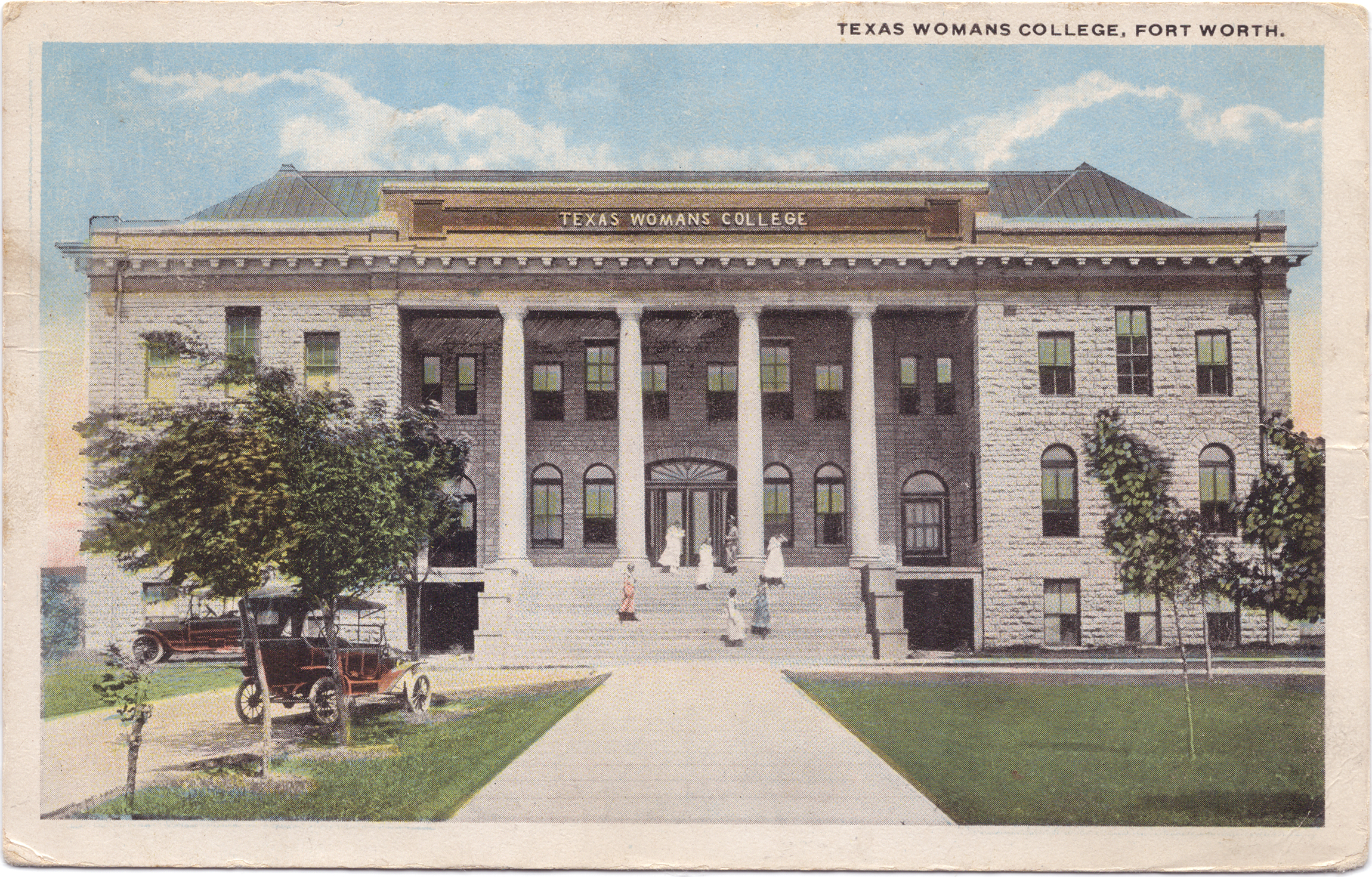
Postcard of Texas Woman's College, 1913

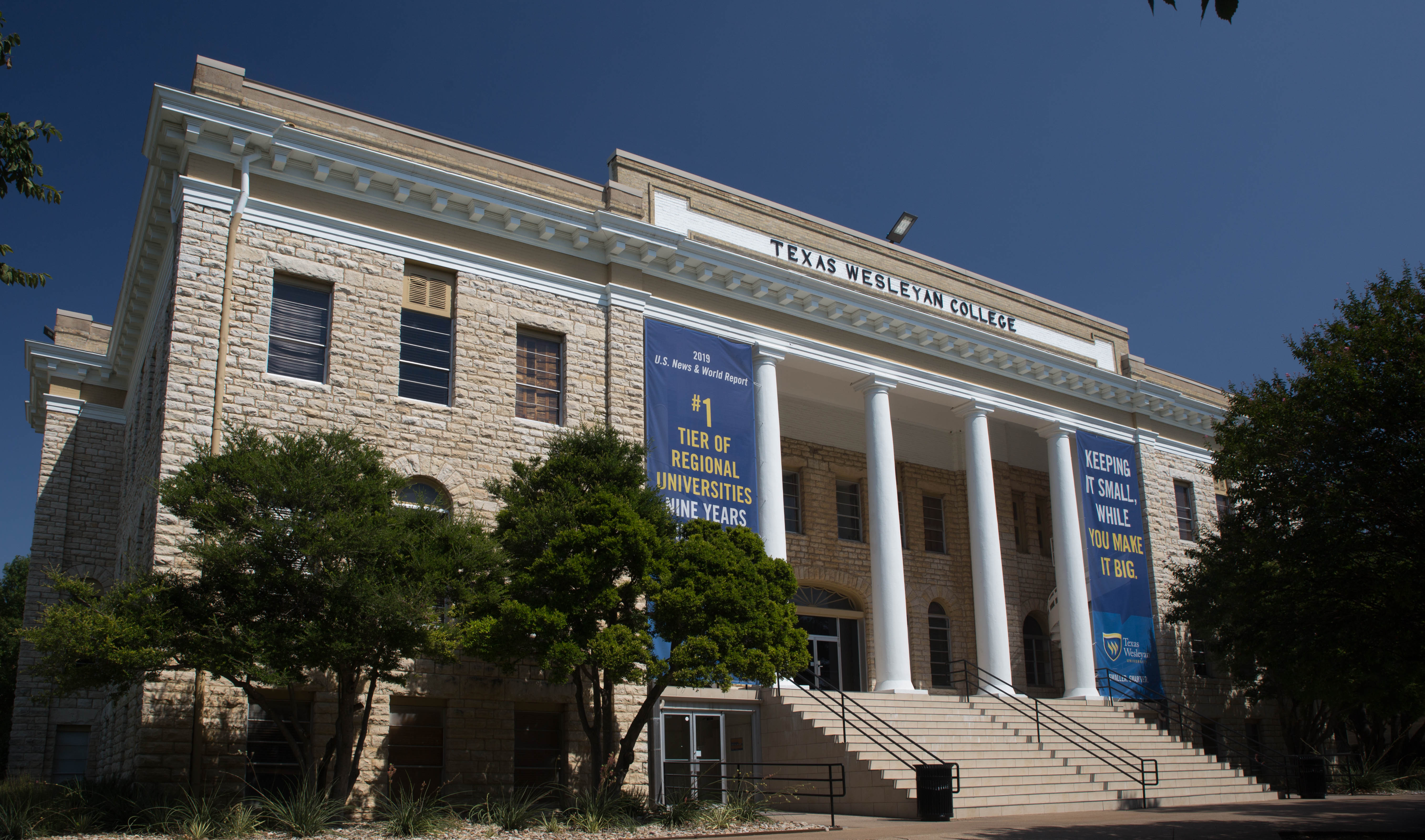
The Administration Building at Texas Wesleyan University

Texas Wesleyan University was founded as Polytechnic College by the Methodist Episcopal Church, South, in 1890. A committee under the direction of Bishop Joseph S. Key explored locations for a campus and settled on a site east of Fort Worth donated by area pioneers A.S. Hall, W.D. Hall, and George Tandy. The school held its first classes in September 1891 with 111 students. In 1902, H.A. Boaz assumed the presidency and managed a period of moderate growth. He hoped to develop Polytechnic College into a new university for Southern Methodism.

When Dallas was selected by Methodist Church leaders as the site for Southern Methodist University, the Polytechnic campus was designated the "woman's college for Southern Methodism", eventually becoming Texas Woman's College in 1914, attracting young women from around Texas and the Southwest. However, when faced with dwindling resources during the Great Depression, the college's trustees voted to close the school in 1931. A merger with the financially secure Texas Wesleyan Academy in Austin saved the college from failure and resulted in the formation of Texas Wesleyan College in 1934. Men were readmitted the same year, returning the institution to a coeducational status.

The university added graduate programs in education in the 1970s and in nurse anesthesia in the 1980s. After contemplating a relocation of the campus to a west Fort Worth site, Texas Wesleyan renewed its commitment to its historic Polytechnic Heights Neighborhood location by building the Eunice and James L. West Library in October 1988. Recognizing the growth in programs, trustees changed the name of the institution to Texas Wesleyan University in January 1989.

To add flexibility in the scheduling of courses and to recognize the special needs of adult learners, the university added the C.E. Hyde Weekend/Evening Program in 1994. The university established a campus in downtown Fort Worth in 1997 with the relocation of the Texas Wesleyan University School of Law, which was established in 1992 following the acquisition of the former Dallas/Fort Worth School of Law. TWU School of Law was subsequently sold to Texas A&M University for $73 million in 2013.

In 2015, Texas Wesleyan completed the Rosedale Renaissance project under the direction of university president Frederick G. Slabach. The $5.7 million project revitalized both the Texas Wesleyan campus and the surrounding Polytechnic Heights neighborhood, and included the construction of the Canafax Clock Tower, the United Methodist Church Central Texas Conference Service Center, and the renovation of the Polytechnic Firehouse.

On July 1, 2023, Texas Wesleyan welcomed Dr. Emily W. Messer as the new University President. Dr. Messer is the first female president in Texas Wesleyan school history.

== Campus ==
Texas Wesleyan is located on a 75-acre campus in the Polytechnic Heights Neighborhood in east Fort Worth. The campus sits 140 feet above the Trinity River and is one of the highest points in the city of Fort Worth. The university employed engineering and architecture firm Freese and Nichols Inc. to develop a master plan for its campus in 2011 that works with major street improvements for the Rosedale area surrounding the campus.

=== Key places ===
Polytechnic College President H.A. Boaz built the Oneal-Sells Administration Building administration building in 1902 and oversaw its renovation and enlargement in 1909. The building was constructed in 1902-1903 of rock acquired from a quarry in Dublin, Texas. A red overhead sign bearing the university's name was added during the 1938–1939 school year. The building was remodeled again from 1963 to 1966. Cora Maud Oneal and Murray Case Sells, for whom the building is named, financed the renovation. The overhead sign was removed during that renovation in 1963. The building became a Recorded Texas Historic Landmark in 1966.

Sanguinet & Staats, a firm noted for building many sites on the National Register of Historic Places, built Dan Waggoner Hall in 1917. The building was primarily used as a dormitory until the late 1970s, when a renovation converted the building into use for offices. After a renovation in 1999, it now houses the offices of the School of Education and classrooms.

The Eunice and James L. West Library was built in 1988 and funded by a gift of Tandy Corporation stock from Eunice and James L. West of Fort Worth. West and his wife, Eunice, gave $16 million in stock to several Texas colleges, $12 million of which came to Texas Wesleyan for construction of the library. The library sits at the front of the campus mall and is a focal point looking from the entrance of campus.

The Polytechnic United Methodist Church was built in 1951-1952 by Wyatt C. Hedrick and is designed in the collegiate gothic style. Hedrick developed a master plan for the college in 1949 and the church wanted its building to fit into the planned design of the campus. The college was allowed to use classrooms in the building during the week. In 2005, the second and third floors were renovated for faculty offices and classrooms. Known as “Poly Church,” it houses the School of Arts and Letters and the university chaplain.

== Academics ==
U.S. News & World Report ranked Texas Wesleyan in the #1 tier of regional universities in 2013, 2012 and 2011.

Texas Wesleyan places an emphasis on the development of critical thinking skills, and the university's strategic plan requires faculty to develop measurable critical thinking, analytical reasoning and creative problem-solving skills in students based on academic proficiency and assessment metrics.

More than 70 percent of Texas Wesleyan's classes have fewer than 20 students, and the university's average student-to-teacher ratio is 15:1.

Texas Wesleyan has over 30 areas of undergraduate study, and honors and pre-professional programs. The university offers graduate programs in business, education, counseling and nurse anesthesia.

University academics are divided into four schools:

- School of Arts & Sciences
- School of Business Administration
- School of Education
- School of Health Professions

The Commission on Colleges of the Southern Association of Colleges and Schools accredits Texas Wesleyan.

Throughout its history, the university has remained closely affiliated with the United Methodist Church. The university maintains special relationships with several United Methodist congregations, and some trustees are representatives of the United Methodist Church. In keeping with Methodist tradition, the university welcomes individuals of all faiths and is thoroughly ecumenical in its practices.

=== Student body ===
Undergraduate enrollment is 1,977 and graduate enrollment is 689 students. 57 percent of the student body is female and 43 percent is male. 54 percent of the student body identify as "minority."

In 2023, 99 percent of entering undergraduates received some form of financial aid. The average amount of aid offered to each student is $23,833.

Undergraduate students make up 74 percent of total student enrollment. The average age of a first-time freshman student at Texas Wesleyan is 19. The average age of a transfer student is 26. 83 percent of Texas Wesleyan students are Texas residents.

== Student life ==
=== Student newspaper ===
The Rambler is a student-run newspaper, which provides interested students with a hands-on learning experience by simulating a real-world newspaper environment. The Rambler also offers a public forum for the dissemination of news and opinion of interest and relevance to the Wesleyan community.

=== Student organizations ===
The Division of Student Affairs administers various student organizations. Texas Wesleyan University Student Organizations focus on a variety topics ranging from personal interests to academic pursuits.

== Athletics ==
The Texas Wesleyan athletic teams are called the Rams. The university is a member of the National Association of Intercollegiate Athletics (NAIA), primarily competing in the Sooner Athletic Conference (SAC) since the 2013–14 academic year. The Rams previously competed in the Red River Athletic Conference (RRAC) from 2001–02 to 2012–13; and in the Heartland Conference of the NCAA Division II ranks from 1999–2000 to 2000–01.

Texas Wesleyan competes in 21 intercollegiate varsity sports. Men's sports include baseball, basketball, cross country, football, golf, soccer, tennis and track & field; women's sports include basketball, cross country, golf, soccer, softball, tennis, track & field and volleyball; and co-ed sports include cheerleading, dance, table tennis, and Esports (Super Smash Bros. Ultimate and Overwatch). Former sports include men's & women's tennis.

The Athletic Department also supports junior varsity opportunities in baseball, men and women's basketball, and men's soccer. Three full-time athletic trainers as well as a strong athletic training education program assist the athletic department. Athletic trainers provide service during team practices and game activities.

=== History ===
The Texas Wesleyan athletic department has been competing in intercollegiate sports for over a century. The Rams boast 157 All-Americans, 59 Academic All-Americans, and six NAIA Hall of Famers. Here is a look at some of the highlights the Rams have enjoyed since 1908:

Football: The Texas Wesleyan football team won two conference titles in their eight seasons in the 1930s. The program was disbanded in 1941 at the advent of World War II. The program was revived and started playing in the 2017 season. Marjorie Herrera Lewis coached defensive backs in 2017, making her the only female college football coach at any level that year.In the 2024 season, Texas Weselyan went undefeated and broke the NAIA record for points scored per game, before eventually falling to Benedictine College in the second round of NAIA playoffs.

Baseball: Texas Wesleyan baseball has amassed over 1,300 victories since 1967 and has had 40 players drafted by major league teams. Jeff Moronko also saw time in the majors with the Cleveland Indians.

- The Rams have produced 19 All-Americans and five NAIA Scholar-Athletes.
- The program's rich history dates back to the early 1900s when the roster included future MLB Hall of Famer Tris Speaker.
- The program won Red River Championships in 2007 and 2010.
- The Rams’ 42 wins in 2008, 2009 and 2013 were the most since 1980.
- The program has won 40 or more games four times under the guidance of head coach Mike Jeffcoat, a former major league pitcher with the Texas Rangers.
- Former 1991 player Wes Johnson is the head baseball coach of the University of Georgia Bulldogs.

Men's basketball: Texas Wesleyan has competed in men's basketball since the 1935–36 season, with a two-year hiatus during World War II.

- Clifton McNeely was the No. 1 draft pick in the first ever NBA draft in 1947 by the Pittsburgh Ironmen.
- The men's basketball team made history in 2006 by winning their first national championship. They also became the lowest seed (27th) ever to win the NAIA National Tournament when Ben Hunt hit a three with 0.2 seconds remaining to deliver a 67–65 win over Oklahoma City.
- In 2017, the Rams won their second National Title. They won the title game 86–76 over Life University.
- The Rams have made 13 NAIA National Tournament appearances beginning with Elite Eight finishes in 1940 and 1941.
- The Rams have produced 21 All-Americans, including the 2008–09 Texas College Player of the Year, Chris Berry, and four NAIA Scholar-Athletes.

Women's basketball: Texas Wesleyan has competed in women's basketball since the 1970–71 season.

- The women's basketball team advanced to their first-ever NAIA National Championship in 2005. In 2011. they made a return trip to nationals after posting a 28-win season.
- The Lady Rams have produced four All-American and four NAIA Scholar-Athlete selections.

Men's golf: Texas Wesleyan has competed in men's golf since 1940.

- The men's golf team has won six national titles and has finished in the Top-3 24 times.
- The Rams have produced 85 All-America selections and nine individuals have won medalist honors at the NAIA National Championship.
- Head coaches O.D. Bounds Jr. (1972) and Bobby Cornett (2012)] and players Ian Leggatt (2011) and Danny Mijovic (2011) have been inducted into the NAIA Hall of Fame.

Women's golf: Texas Wesleyan has competed in women's golf since the 2012–13 season.

- On October 1, 2013, Alexis Belton became the first Lady Ram to notch an individual tournament win.
- In just their second season, the 2013–14 squad was nationally ranked in every NAIA Coaches' Top-25 Poll.
- The Lady Rams have twice been named an NAIA Scholar-Team and have had one NAIA Scholar-Athlete

Men's soccer: Texas Wesleyan has competed in men's soccer since 1988.

- The men's soccer team won their first Conference championship (Red River) and advanced to the Region VI tournament for the first time in 2005.
- In 2011, the Rams advanced to the NAIA National Tournament Opening Round for the first time in the history of the program.
- Ram Soccer has the third most goals scored in one game in NAIA history, with 23 goals in 2003 against Dallas Christian.
- The Rams have had five NAIA All-Americans and nine NAIA Scholar-Athletes.

Women's soccer: Texas Wesleyan has competed in women's soccer since 1998.

- The women's soccer team won its first Conference championship (Red River) in 2005 and took the title again in 2006 and 2008.
- In 2008 they advanced to the NAIA National Tournament.
- Jessica Carrion was named first-team All-Conference in all four seasons with the Lady Rams. She graduated after the 2005 season with six Texas Wesleyan records, holding the single game, season and career records in goals and points.
- The Lady Rams have had seven NAIA All-Americans and ten NAIA Scholar–Athletes

Softball: Texas Wesleyan has competed in softball since 1978.

- The softball team won the Red River regular season and tournament titles in 2012.
- The Lady Rams advanced to the national tournament in 1984 and 2012.
- Lady Ram head coach Shannon Gower became the program's winningest coach in 2009. That record now stands at 250.
- The Lady Rams have produced two All-Americans and 12 NAIA Scholar-Athletes.

Table tennis: Texas Wesleyan Table Tennis is one of the most dominant programs in college athletics.

- The Rams have won 65 national titles since 2002, including a stretch of 11 consecutive team titles.
- Their National Championships breakdown as follows: Coed Team 13 (2004, 2005, 2006, 2007, 2008, 2009, 2010, 2011, 2012, 2013, 2014, 2016, 2017), Women's Team 7 (2007, 2008, 2009, 2011, 2013, 2016, 2017), Men's Singles 9 (2002, 2003, 2004, 2005, 2006, 2007, 2009, 2011, 2013), Women's Singles 7 (2002, 2004, 2006, 2007, 2008, 2010, 2011), Men's Doubles 8 (2002, 2003, 2005, 2006, 2007, 2011, 2012, 2014), Women's Doubles 7 (2002, 2004, 2006, 2007, 2008, 2009, 2013), Mixed Doubles 8 (2002, 2004, 2005, 2006, 2007, 2009, 2010, 2011).

Volleyball: Texas Wesleyan has competed in volleyball since 1978.

- The volleyball team advanced to the “Elite 8” of the national tournament in 2004 and 2005.
- The Lady Rams have made eight trips to nationals and finished as high as second in 1982 and 1990.
- In 1991 Willa Gipson and Diane Urey were both inducted into the NAIA Hall of Fame.
- In 2005, the Lady Rams set school records by winning 58 consecutive games and 30 consecutive matches.
- The Lady Rams have had 24 All-Americans and 14 NAIA Scholar-Athletes.

The Texas Wesleyan athletics program has also enjoyed success in other sports that are now defunct:

- The Texas Wesleyan men and women's tennis teams won four conference titles in their history, and the men's team qualified for the NAIA National Tournament four times.

== Community outreach ==
Texas Wesleyan University's outreach efforts have been focused on the immediate area surrounding the main campus. An appropriation request proposal was submitted by the university for the 2009 fiscal year to the U.S. representative Michael C. Burgess of the 26th District for a project entitled “Rosedale Avenue Redevelopment Initiative”. In this proposal the university requests funding for a “...comprehensive revitalization plan that includes commercial and residential development, with park-like open spaces.”

The university donated land and help arrange for the construction of a new Boys and Girls Club on Rosedale Street, directly across from the campus. Opened in March 2002, this facility provides activities for area youth, and offers opportunities for Wesleyan students to mentor and tutor local youngsters. The university also offers a Speak Up Scholarship, which is designed for area students with a B or better average who graduate from both the William James Middle School and Poly High School, both located in the Polytechnic Heights neighborhood. Students are given financial assistance in the form of scholarships or loans to attend Texas Wesleyan. Critics have pointed out that not enough students and school advisors are aware of the Speak Up Scholarship, however the program has helped five to ten students a year for the last few years, with ten being awarded the scholarship in 2004.

The commitment to the community has faltered during the university's history. In 1981, concerns mounted in regards to the economic decline in the Polytechnic area. Sociologist Dr. Sarah Horsfall's 2005 research article about the Inner City of Fort Worth explains; “The trustees, urged by the then-President, voted to relocate the campus and purchased land in the northwest of Fort Worth. Community organizers and the Methodist Church opposed the move and worked to keep Texas Wesleyan where it was” . By 1985, the plan was abandoned as impractical. Instead, the university administrators (and a new university president) renewed their dedication and commitment to the Polytechnic Heights neighborhood.

== Notable alumni ==
- Mary Lou Bruner, candidate for a seat on the Texas State Board of Education
- Joel Burns, politician and LGBT rights activist
- Elliott Connie, psychotherapist, author, host of "The Elliott Connie Show", and social media content creator
- Rob Dickerman, neurological and spine surgeon
- Jasna Fazlić, table-tennis player/coach, Olympic medalist
- Biba Golic, table-tennis player
- Kay Granger, United States representative
- Harry W. Greene, herpetologist
- Mark Hazinski, table-tennis player
- Ben Hunt, professional basketball player
- Wes Johnson, head baseball coach of the Georgia Bulldogs (did not graduate)
- Phil King, Texas state representative
- Jim Landtroop, former Texas state representative
- Clifton McNeely, All-American college basketball player and first ever #1 NBA draft pick
- Michelle Royer, Miss USA 1987
- Jad Saxton, voice actress affiliated with Funimation
- Tris Speaker, Hall of Fame baseball player and manager (did not graduate)
- B.J. Stiles, editor, nonprofit leader and activist
- The Undertaker, WWE professional wrestler
- Marc Veasey, United States representative
- Brian Wanamaker, professional basketball player, All-American
- Michael R. Williams, president of UNT Health Science Center
