= Rob Dickerman =

American neurological & spine surgeon

- Education: PhD in biomedical sciences, DO, University of North Texas Health Science Center (1998)
- Occupations: Neurological and spine surgeon
- Employer(s): Presbyterian Hospital of Plano, The Medical Center of Plano

Rob Dickerman is a neurological and spine surgeon from Plano, Texas, who has performed high profile surgical procedures on professional athletes.

== Education and professional career ==
Rob Dickerman attended Texas Wesleyan University for his undergraduate studies, earning a bachelor's degree in chemistry. He completed his graduate studies at University of North Texas Health Science Center, earning a Doctor of Philosophy (Ph.D). in biomedical sciences as well as a Doctor of Osteopathic Medicine (D.O.) degree in 1998, receiving a chancellor's award. He performed his residency at North Shore University-Long Island Jewish Medical Center, where he was chief resident. He has completed fellowships from Texas Back Institute and a brain tumor fellowship from the National Institutes of Health (NIH).

Dickerman specializes in non-invasive spinal surgery and the treatment of brain tumors. He currently serves as director of neurosurgery at Presbyterian Hospital of Plano, as well as the director of spine surgery at The Medical Center of Plano. He also serves on the staff at the Medical Center of McKinney, TX, as well as at Forest Park Medical Center in Dallas. He has served as a clinical associate professor of neurosurgery at the University of North Texas Health Science Center, and as a member of the adjunct faculty at The Texas Back Institute. He is now an adjunct professor of surgery at UNTHSC.

== Use of stem cells for spinal fusion ==
Dickerman has received attention from the media for performing a controversial procedure to treat patients for back pain, that utilizes the patient's own stem cells. For the procedure, stem cells are extracted from the patient's hip with a long needle, condensed in a centrifuge, and placed into small containers (called cages) that are then inserted between degenerating discs in the spine during an operating room procedure. Patients then tend to have a shorter recovery time than those receiving traditional spinal fusion (which can take over a year for recovery), a more invasive procedure that uses cadaver bones or a piece of the patient's own hip bone. The procedure, which is the same that Texas governor Rick Perry received in 2011, is considered controversial because it is experimental and not approved by the U.S. Food and Drug Administration (FDA). Following Perry's surgery, he has urged legislators to explore regulation and approval of the procedure, although Celltex (the company that performed Perry's procedure) is currently not allowed to offer treatment in the United States. The procedure is undergoing clinical trials.

== Notable patients ==
Dickerman has performed a number of procedures that were covered in the media, either due to the notability of the patient or the unusual nature of the case.

=== Lanny Wadkins ===
In 2008, former PGA champion Lanny Wadkins was no longer able to play golf due to debilitating back pain. Dickerman, along with orthopedic surgeon Scott Blumenthal performed a double fusion surgery on Wadkins, decompressing nerves in his back. During the surgery, the doctors also removed a softball-sized cyst from Wadkin's neck, extracting it from his trapezius muscle. Watkins was able to return to the PGA.

=== Removal of nail from construction worker's skull ===
In 2011, a construction worker at a job site in North Texas was accidentally shot with a nail gun, firing a four-inch barbed nail into the dominant lobe of the man's brain. Dickerman oversaw the removal of the nail from the man's brain. The man made a full recovery.

=== Jiahone Guo ===
In 2012, Jiahone Guo, a Chinese graduate student in Texas, was injured in a club soccer match, when an opponent kneed him in the head, shattering his skull. Due to the swelling of the brain, Dr. Dickerman removed a quarter of the comatose student's skull, at the time giving him a 50% chance of survival. After two months, when the swelling had subsided, Dickerman placed a prosthetic plate on Guo's head. He recovered and was able to return to his studies, although he is no longer allowed to play soccer.

== Affiliations and organizations ==
Dickerman is a member of the American Brain Tumor Association and the Pituitary Society. He has served on the committee of the North American Spine Society. He is the founder and director of the Neurosurgery Research Foundation of Texas, a charitable foundation established in 2006 for research in neurological disease. He is also a member of the American College of Surgeons, American Osteopathic Association, Cervical Spine Research Society, and the American Spinal Cord Injury Association.

== Publications ==
=== Textbooks and book chapters ===
- Androgens and Cardiovascular Disease, Rob D. Dickerman, University of North Texas Health Science Center at Fort Worth, 1998
- "Discogenic back pain", Orthopaedic Knowledge Update: Spine. 3rd ed. Spivak JM, Connolly PJ, eds. Rosemont, IL: American Academy of Orthopaedic Surgeons; 2006
- "Automated intraoperative EMG testing during percutaneous pedicle screw placement". Spine, Dickerman RD, Guyer R, Hisey M., New York, NY : Elsevier Science Inc, 2006
- "Spinal Stenosis without Spondylolisthesis", The Comprehensive Treatment of the Aging Spine: Minimally Invasive and Advanced Techniques - Expert Consult, James J. Yue, Richard Guyer, J. Patrick Johnson, Larry T. Khoo, Stephen H. Hochschuler, Elsevier Health Sciences, Dec 3, 2010
- "Socioeconomics of Spinal Injuries", Neurotrauma and Critical Care of the Spine, Jack Jallo, Alexander Richard Vaccaro, editors, New York: Thieme Medical Publishers, 2009
- "Intraoperative Somatosensory Evoked Potentials and Electromyography", Spine Trauma, 2nd Edition, Zigler, Jack E, editor, Rosemont, IL : American Academy of Orthopaedic Surgeons, 2011
