= Polytechnic Heights, Fort Worth, Texas =

Neighborhood in Fort Worth, Texas

Polytechnic Heights, known as Poly by locals, is a neighborhood of Fort Worth, Texas, located on the southeast side of the city. In 2016, the neighborhood had roughly 20,000 citizens. Texas Wesleyan University is located in Polytechnic Heights. Rosedale Street serves as the neighborhood's main roadway.

== History ==
Initially developed in the 1850s, the area experienced a golden age in the 1930s as a place for faculty housing for Texas Wesleyan University. Up until the 1960s, the area was middle class and white. The area became more ethnically diverse because of the Civil Rights Movement, as many middle class African Americans migrated from the Stop Six and Glenwood neighborhoods. By the 1980s the neighborhood was mostly African American and low income. (This process and its effects on race relations and crime were analyzed by sociologist Scott Cummings in his book Left Behind in Rosedale, in which the neighborhood was identified pseudonymously as 'Rosedale'.) During the 1990s the neighborhood experienced an influx of Hispanic residents and a substantial decrease in crime.

== See also ==
- List of Neighborhoods in Fort Worth, Texas
