= Driscoll Children's Hospital =

Coordinates: 27.7484°N 97.3862°W

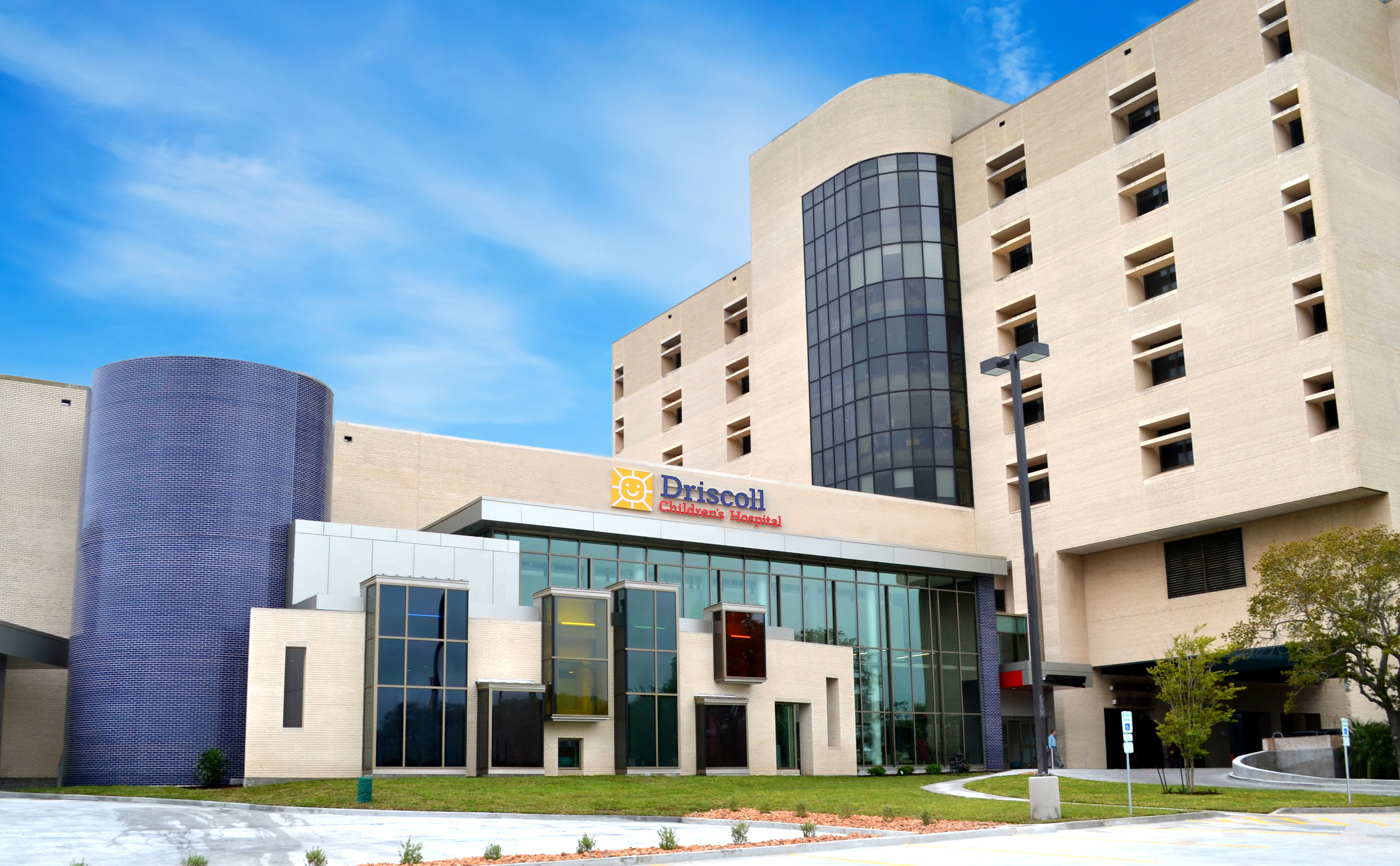

Geography
- Location: Corpus Christi, Texas, Corpus Christi and surrounding South Texas, Texas, United States

Organization
- Type: Children's general

Services
- Beds: 225

History
- Founded: 1953

Links
- Website: http://www.driscollchildrens.org/
- Lists: Hospitals in Texas

Driscoll Children's Hospital is a children's hospital located in Corpus Christi, Texas and was founded as a charity children's hospital in 1953 by the last will and testament of Clara Driscoll with the assistance of her primary physician Dr. McIver Furman. In 1970, Driscoll Children's Hospital had its status changed from charity only to not-for-profit. Driscoll Children's Hospital is the 7th largest employer in Corpus Christi. Driscoll was the first hospital in South Texas to provide pediatric emergency services and to perform an organ transplant. It is accredited by the Joint Commission (JC). Driscoll Children's Hospital operates as the only asthma camp in South Texas, Camp Easy Breathers.
