= Julie Ivy =

Professor of industrial and systems engineering

Julie Simmons Ivy is the department chair of and professor in the department of industrial and operations engineering at the University of Michigan. Her research involves health care statistics and the application of systems engineering to health care and to other social services including food bank distribution systems.

== Education and career ==
Ivy graduated from the University of Michigan in 1991 and completed a master's degree in 1992 at the Georgia Institute of Technology. She returned to Michigan for doctoral study, completing a Ph.D. in 1998. Her dissertation, Determining Maintenance and Replacement Policies for a Multi-State Deteriorating Process with Probabilistic Monitoring, was supervised by Stephen M. Pollock.

She worked as a faculty member in the School of Business at the University of Michigan from 1998 to 2007 before moving to North Carolina State University, where she was a professor of industrial and systems engineering and a Fitts Faculty Fellow in Health Systems Engineering.

== Service ==
Ivy is African-American, and was the president of the INFORMS Minority Issues Forum for 2011–2013. She also chaired the INFORMS Health Applications Section for 2007.

Since 2016 she has been chair of the board of directors of the Health Systems Engineering Alliance, an association of university programs focused on engineering approaches to health care delivery.

== Recognition ==
In 2016, INFORMS gave Ivy their Moving Spirit Award for her work with their Minority Issues Forum. She was the 2020 winner of the WORMS Award for the Advancement of Women in Operations Research and Management Science. In 2022 she was named a Fellow of INFORMS, "for her service and significant contributions in healthcare and hunger relief, which have advanced the stature and recognition of the OR/MS profession, making it more inclusive for underrepresented members".
