= Lee F. Jackson =

American politician

Lee F. Jackson is the former chancellor of the University of North Texas System (2002–2017). Jackson was the State of Texas' longest-serving Chancellor when he announced his retirement in March, 2017.

Jackson previously served as Dallas County Judge from 1987 to 2001. Prior to that, Jackson represented Dallas County in the Texas House of Representatives from 1976 to 1986. Jackson was lauded for his work in public by D Magazine, which named him Dallas' Best Public Official in 1996 and a Legislative All-Star in 1981.
