= Steve Jurczyk =

American engineer (1962–2023)

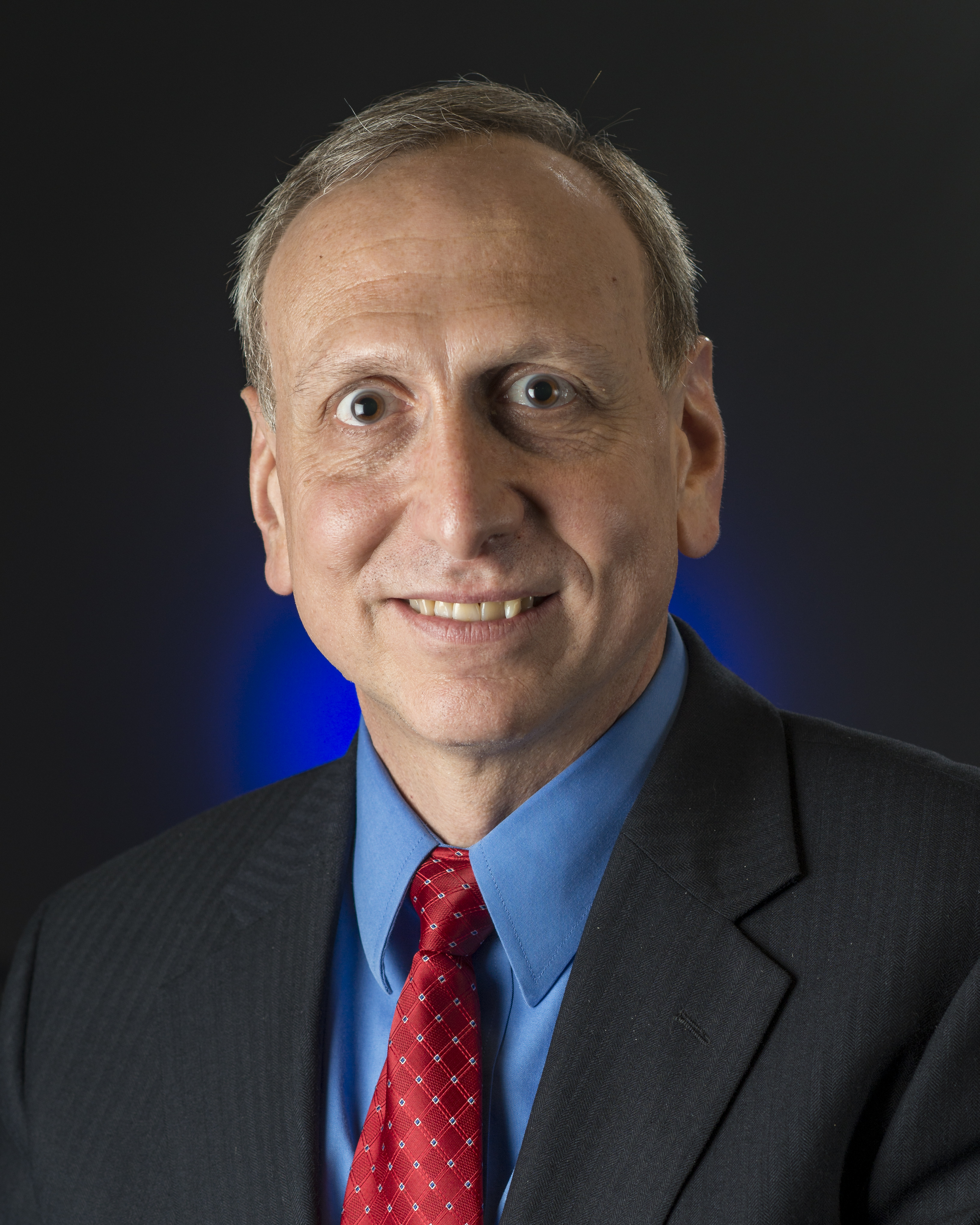

Acting Administrator of the National Aeronautics and Space Administration
- In office January 20, 2021 – May 3, 2021
- President: Joe Biden
- Preceded by: Jim Bridenstine
- Succeeded by: Bill Nelson

Associate Administrator of the National Aeronautics and Space Administration
- In office May 21, 2019 – May 14, 2021
- President: Donald Trump; Joe Biden
- Deputy: Melanie Saunders
- Preceded by: Robert M. Lightfoot Jr.
- Succeeded by: Robert D. Cabana

Personal details
- Born: February 20, 1962
- Died: November 23, 2023 (aged 61)
- Education: University of Virginia (BS) (MS)

Stephen G. Jurczyk (February 20, 1962 – November 23, 2023) was an American engineer who served as the acting administrator of NASA. He previously worked at Langley Research Center in Hampton, Virginia.

== Education and career ==
Jurczyk was a graduate of the University of Virginia where he received Bachelor of Science and Master of Science degrees in Electrical Engineering in 1984 and 1986. He was an associate fellow of the American Institute of Aeronautics and Astronautics.

Jurczyk began his NASA career in 1988 at Langley Research Center in the Electronic Systems Branch as a design, integration and testing engineer developing several space-based Earth remote sensing systems. From 2002 to 2004, Jurczyk was director of engineering, and from 2004 to 2006 he was director of research and technology at Langley where he led the organizations’ contributions to a broad range of research, technology and engineering disciplines contributing to all NASA mission areas. From August 2006, Jurczyk served as Langley's Deputy Center Director. In May 2014, Jurczyk was appointed as Director at NASA’s Langley Research Center. There, he headed NASA’s first field Center, which plays a critical role in NASA’s aeronautics research, exploration and science missions.

After Langley, Jurczyk was the associate administrator of the Space Technology Mission Directorate, since June 2015. In this position he formulated and executed the agency’s Space Technology programs, focusing on developing and demonstrating transformative technologies for human and robotic exploration of the Solar System in partnership with industry and academia. In May 2018, Jurczyk became NASA's associate administrator, the agency's highest-ranking civil servant position.

Jurczyk became acting NASA administrator following Jim Bridenstine's resignation on January 20, 2021.

Jurczyk retired from NASA on May 14, 2021. He was replaced by astronaut and John F. Kennedy Space Center director Robert D. Cabana.

On August 25, 2021, emails surfaced on a hacking forum allegedly showing United Launch Alliance Vice President Robbie Sabathier being critical of NASA administrators. At the time the email was sent, the acting NASA Administrator position was filled by Steve Jurczyk. Among many statements made, Sabather stated, "NASA HQ’s A-Suite leadership is currently incompetent and unpredictable". ULA has not commented on the authenticity of the emails but has stated it is "taking this alleged cyber crime seriously".

Steve Jurczyk died from pancreatic cancer on November 23, 2023, at the age of 61.

== Honors and awards ==
Jurczyk received several awards during his NASA career, including two NASA Outstanding Leadership Medals, the Presidential Rank Award for Meritorious Executive in 2006, and the Presidential Rank Award for Distinguished Executive in 2016—the highest honors attainable for federal government leadership.

Government offices
Preceded by Jim Bridenstine	Administrator of NASA; Acting; 2021	Succeeded by Bill Nelson
