= Asthma camp =

Asthma camp is a summer camp that is specialized for children with severe versions of asthma. Typically categorized as a special needs summer camp. The camp counselor role is fulfilled by respiratory therapists and registered nurses in order to provide a safe and positive experience for children who would otherwise not be able to go to a summer camp. Asthma camps aim to provide a positive experience for children with asthma through activities like hiking, swimming, canoeing, rope games, arts and crafts, campfires and more all with special considerations and attention to asthma. Children that attend asthma camps tend to have improved asthma self-management skills and an increase in overall quality of life.

== Medical considerations ==
Asthma camps are led by respiratory therapists and nurses who provide medical education, management and oversight for attendees. The camps should not have any element that can trigger asthma attacks such as pollen or animal dander; this is maintained by camp staff with medical oversight by the medically trained staff. Over half of cases in children in the United States occur in areas with air quality below EPA standards, therefore the best locations for these camps are in the top cities for raising a child with asthma.

== Asthma camps ==
=== United States ===
Approximately 120 asthma camps presently serve nearly 10,000 children in the United States.

Missouri

- AAFA Superkids Asthma Day Camp — Kansas City, Missouri

Montana

- Camp Huff N Puff — Helena, Montana

Tennessee

- Camp Wezbegon — Knoxville, Tennessee

Texas

- Camp Broncho of North Texas — Dallas, Texas
- Camp Asthma Buster/Campamento de Asma "Buster" — El paso, Texas
- Camp Easy Breathers — Corpus Christi, Texas

Arizona

- Camp-Not-A-Wheeze — Heber, Arizona
