= Scott Ransom =

American physician

- Citizenship: United States
- Education: Harvard University; University of Michigan; Kansas City University; Pacific Lutheran University
- Occupations: Consultant; Healthcare Management expert Physician-Scientist

Scott B. Ransom is an American physician, educator, and businessman.

== Biography ==
Dr. Scott Ransom served as a strategy consultant for 12 years and previously worked over 20 years as a professor, researcher, educator, administrator and practicing obstetrician. He currently serves as a board member and advisor for several healthcare companies while continuing research, writing and teaching in areas related to wellness, flourishing and happiness.

He served as a full-time strategy consulting firm leader/partner from 2013 to 2023 at McKinsey and Company, PwC|Strategy& and Oliver Wyman where he advised over 250 healthcare organizations on 7 continents. He served as Vice Chancellor for Health Affairs for the UNT System and President/CEO for the University of North Texas Health Science Center from 2006 to 2013. He was a tenured Professor in Obstetrics, Gynecology, Health Management and Policy and Director of the Program for Health Improvement and Leadership Development at the University of Michigan from 1999 to 2006. Prior to that role, he served as a hospital VPMA, regional Chief Medical Officer, and SVP/Chief Quality Officer with Detroit Medical Center while serving as an Associate Professor in Obstetrics and Gynecology at Wayne State University School of Medicine.

Dr. Ransom is a fellow in several professional organizations including the American College of Healthcare Executives (FACHE), American College of Surgeons (FACS), and American College of Obstetrics and Gynecology (FACOG). He is a past President and Distinguished Fellow of the American College of Physician Executives (FACPE). He has delivered over 4000 babies and completed over 10,000 surgeries as a board-certified obstetrician.

== Education ==
Scott holds a M.P.H. in clinical effectiveness from Harvard University School of Public Health, a M.B.A. from University of Michigan Ross School of Business, completed residency in obstetrics and gynecology from Beaumont Hospital in Dearborn Michigan/affiliated with the University of Michigan, and graduated from medical school at Kansas City University. He earned a B.A. in chemistry from Pacific Lutheran University and is a graduate of the U.S. Marine Corps Officer Candidate School.

== Selected publications ==
Selected Books

- Ransom SB, McNeeley SG. Gynecology For The Primary Care Provider. Philadelphia: W.B. Saunders Company, publisher, 1997.
- Ransom SB, Pinsky W. Clinical Resource and Quality Management. Tampa: American College of Physician Executives, publisher, 1999.
- Ransom SB, McNeeley SG, Munkarah AR, Dombrowski MP, Moghissi KS. Practical Strategies in Obstetrics and Gynecology. Philadelphia: W.B. Saunders Company, publisher, 2000.
- Ransom SB, Tropman J, Pinsky WW. Advanced Principles of Medical Management: Enhancing Physician Performance. Tampa: American College of Physician Executive, publisher, 2000.
- Ransom SB, Dombrowski MP, Ginsberg K, Evans MP. Contemporary Therapy in Obstetrics and Gynecology. Philadelphia: W.B. Saunders, publisher, 2002.
- Ransom SB. The Wisdom of Top Healthcare CEOs. Tampa: American College of Physician Executives, publisher, 2003.
- Ransom SB, Joshi M, Nash D. The Healthcare Quality Book: Vision, Strategy and Tools. (first edition), Chicago: Health Administration Press, 2005.
- Ransom E, Joshi M, Nash D, Ransom SB. The Healthcare Quality Book: Vision, Strategy and Tools. (second edition), Chicago: Health Administration Press, 2008.
- Joshi M, Ransom E, Nash D, Ransom SB. The Healthcare Quality Book: Vision, Strategy and Tools. (third edition), Chicago: Health Administration Press, 2014.
- Nash D, Joshi M, Ransom E, Ransom SB. The Healthcare Quality Book: Vision, Strategy and Tools. (fourth edition), Chicago: Health Administration Press, 2019.
- Joshi M, Ransom SB, Ransom E, Nash D. The Healthcare Quality Book: Vision, Strategy and Tools.(fifth edition), Chicago: Health Administration Press, 2023.

Selected Articles

- Ransom SB, McNeeley SG, Hosseini RB. The cost effectiveness of routine type and screen determination before elective laparoscopy. Obstet Gynecol 86(3):346-8,1995.
- Ransom SB, McNeeley SG, Doot G, Cotton D. The effect of capitated and fee-for-service remuneration on physician decision making in gynecology. Obstet Gynecol 87(5):707-10, 1996.
- Ransom SB, Dombrowski MP, Shephard R, Leonardi M. The economic cost of the medical-legal tort system. Am J Obstet Gynecol 174(6):1903-9, 1996.
- Ransom SB, McNeeley SG, Malone JM. A cost-effectiveness evaluation of preoperative type and screen testing for vaginal hysterectomy. Am J Obstet Gynecol 175(5):1201-6, 1996.
- Ransom SB, White C, McNeeley SG, Diamond MP. A cost analysis of endometrial ablation, abdominal hysterectomy, vaginal hysterectomy, and laparoscopic-assisted vaginal hysterectomy in the treatment of primary menorrhagia. J Amer Assoc Gynecol Laparosc 4(1):29-34, 1996.
- Ransom SB, McNeeley SG, White C, Diamond MP. A cost-effectiveness evaluation of laparoscopic disposable verses nondisposable infraumbilical trocars. J Amer Assoc Gynecol Laparosc 4(1):25-9, 1996.
- Ransom SB, Gell JW, Harrison M, McDonald FD. Implementation of a Clinical Pathway for Cesarean Section. Am J Man Care 2(10):1374-9, 1996.
- Ransom SB, Gell JW, Harrison M, McDonald FD. Gynecologists make hysterectomy (DRG 359) clinical pathways work. Journal of Pelvic Surgery. 4(3):109-114, 1998.
- Ransom SB, McNeeley SG, Yono A, Ettlie J, Dombrowski MP. The development and implementation of normal vaginal delivery clinical pathways in a large multihospital health system. Am J Man Care. 4(4):723-7, 1998.
- Ransom SB, Moldenhaurer J. Diagnosis and management of PMS. The Physician and Sportsmedicine. 26(4):35-43, 1998.
- Ransom SB. An information system model for negotiation of capitation contracts. Physician Executive 24(3):38-41, 1998.
- McNeeley SG, Hendrix SL, Mazzoni M, Kmak DC, Ransom SB. Medically sound, cost-effective treatment for pelvic inflammatory disease and tuboovarian abscess. Am J Obstet Gynecol 178: 1272-8, 1998.
- McNeeley SG, Hendrix SL, Bennet S, Singh A., Ransom SB. Synthetic graft placement in the treatment of fascial dehiscence with necrosis and infection. Am J Obstet Gynecol 179:1430-5, 1998.
- Ransom SB, Fundara G, Dombrowski, MP. The cost-effectiveness of routine type and screen testing for expected vaginal delivery. Obstet Gynecol 92:493-5, 1998.
- Ransom SB. Managed Care and Outcomes in Surgical Practice. Journal of Pelvic Surgery, 5(2):301-2, 1999.
- McComish JF, Greenberg R, Bryant JK, Chruscial HL, Ransom SB. Effectiveness of a grief group for women in residential substance abuse treatment. Substance Abuse 20(1):41-54, 1999.
- Ransom SB, Greenberg R, McComish J, Tolford D. Oral metronidazole vs. Metrogel Vaginal for treating bacterial vaginosis: A cost-effectiveness evaluation. J Reprod Med 44:359-362, 1999.
- Ransom SB, Fundara G, Dombrowski MP. Cost-effectiveness of routine blood type and screen testing for cesarean section J Reprod Med 44(7):592-4, 1999.
- Downing S, Ransom SB. Development and Implementation of clinical pathways with Activity Based Costing. Physician Executive, 26(1): 9-11, April 2000.
- Ransom SB, Tropman JE. The development of an Academic Faculty Practice Compensation Program Using Activity Based Costing. Physician Executive 26(3):17-8, May 2000.
- Miller V, Ransom SB, Shalhoub A, Sokol RJ, Evans MP. Multifetal Pregnancy Reduction: Perinatal and Fiscal Outcomes. Am J Obstet Gynecol, 182(6):1575-80, 2000.
- Ransom SB, Dombrowski MP, Studdert D, Mello M, Brennan TA. Reduced Medico-Legal Risk By Compliance With Obstetrical Clinical Pathways: A Case-Control Study. Obstet Gynecol, 101(4):751-5, 2003.
- Ransom SB. CQO role offers broad leadership challenges. Physician Executive Journal, 29(4):65-7, Jul/Aug, 2003.
- Ransom SB. Six Keys to Weighing Probability and Achieving Organizational Improvements. Physician Executive Journal, 30(2): 64-67, Mar/Apr 2004.
- Lenzi T, Keeton K, Chames M, Ransom S, Mozurkewich E. Inherited thrombophilias and severe pregnancy complications: A structured review. Amer J Obstet Gynecol 191(10):161, 2004.
- Ransom S, Keeton K, Mendez D, Johnson T, Randolph J. Maximize births or minimize cerebral palsy: A cost effectiveness analysis of in vitro fertilization. Amer J Obstet Gynecol. 191(10):1016, 2004.
- Robinson P, Xu X, Keeton K, Fenner D, Johnson T, Ransom SB. The impact of medical-legal risk on obstetrician-gynecologist supply. Obstetrics and Gynecology 105: 1296-1302, 2005.
- Chang T, Liang J, Ransom SB. How Taiwan does it: Seeing more patients for less. Physician Executive Journal 31(4): 38-42, 2005.
- Cazan-London G, Mozurkewich E, Xu X, Ransom SB. Willingness or unwillingness to perform cesarean section for impending preterm delivery at 24 weeks gestation: A cost-effectiveness analysis. Am J Obstet Gynecol, 193: 1187-92, 2005.
- Ransom SB, Jessica, Schultz C, Anderson E, Xu X, Siefert K, Villarruel A. Interdisciplinary solutions to medical conditions leading to birth outcome disparities for African American women. African American Research Perspectives, 11(1): 1-16, 2005.
- Yakel B, Ford B, Anderson E, Ransom SB. Improving African American Birth Outcomes by Understanding Information Seeking Processes. African American Research Perspectives, 11(1): 31-47, 2005.
- Xu X, Jensen G, Ransom S. Patients with diabetes enrolled in Medicare HMOs more likely to use oral medications. Drug Benefit Trends. 17: 298-306, 2005.
- Ford B, Villarruel A, Anderson E, Ransom SB, Siefert K. The life course of African American women and their relationships to providers: perceived discrimination leading to birth outcome disparities. African American Research Perspectives, 11(1): 48-64, 2005.
- Wooten L, Schultz C, Anderson E, Yakel B, Siefert K, Ransom SB. Leadership policies that impact birth outcome disparities. African American Research Perspectives, 11(1): 17-30, 2005.
- Patel D, Xu X, Thompson A, Ransom SB, Ivy J, Delancy J. Childbirth and pelvic floor dysfunction: An epidemiologic approach to the assessment of prevention opportunities at delivery. Am J Obstet Gynecol, 195(1):23-8, 2006.
- Xu X, Vahration A, Patel D, McRee A, Ransom S. Impact of provider attitudes and practices on access to emergency contraceptive pills. American Journal of Epidemiology 163 S152, June 2006.
- Xu X, Patel D, Vahratian A, Ransom SB. Insurance Coverage and Health Care among Near-Elderly Women. Women’s Health Issues, 16(3):139-48, May–June, 2006.
- Xu X, Vahratian A, Patel DA, McRee A, Ransom S. Emergency contraception provision: a survey of Michigan physicians from five medical specialties. Journal of Women’s Health 16(4):489-498, 2007.
- Advincula AP, Xu X, Goudeau S, Ransom SB. Robot-assisted laparoscopic myomectomy versus abdominal myomectomy: A comparison of surgical outcomes and costs. J Minim Invasive Gynecol. 14(6):698-705, Nov/Dec 2007.
- Xu X, Siefert KA, Jacobson PD, Lori JR, Ransom SB. The effects of medical liability on obstetric care supply in Michigan. Amer J Obstet Gynecol, 198(2):205.e1-9, 2008.
- Xu X, Lori JR, Siefert KA, Jacobson PD, Ransom SB. Malpractice liability burden in midwifery: A survey of Michigan certified nurse-midwives. Journal of Midwifery & Women’s Health, 53(1):19-27, 2008.
- Padmanabhan V, Siefert K, Ransom S, Johnson T, Pinkerton J, Anderson L, Kannan K. Maternal bisphenol-A levels at delivery: a looming problem? J Perinatology, 28(4):258-63, 2008,
- Xu X, Siefert K, Jacobson P, Lori J, Ransom S. The impact of malpractice burden on Michigan obstetrician-gynecologists’ career satisfaction. Women’s Health Issues, 18(4):229-37, 2008.
- Maillert LM, Ivy JS, Ransom SB, Diehl K. Assessing Dynamic Breast Cancer Screening Policies. Operations Research 56(6):1411-1427, 2008.
- Xu X, Lori J, Siefert K, Jacobson P, Lori JR, Gueorguieva I, Ransom S. Malpractice burden, rural location and discontinuation of obstetric care: A study of obstetric providers in Michigan. The Journal of Rural Health, 25(1):33-42, 2009.
- Xu X, Grigorescu V, Siefert KA, Lori JR, Ransom SB. Cost of Racial Disparity in Preterm Birth: Evidence from Michigan. Journal of Health Care for the Poor and Underserved, 20(3):729-47, 2009.
- Xu X, Ivy JS, Patel DA, Patel SN, Smith DG, Ransom SB, Fenner D, Delancey JOL. Pelvic floor consequences of cesarean delivery on maternal request in women with a single birth: a cost-effectiveness analysis, J Women’s Health, 19(1):147-60, 2010.
- Goldsmith J, Ransom S. The governance challenge in hospital turnaround and transformation. The Governance Institute, 15(3), May 2018.
