= List of Sigma Gamma Tau chapters =

Sigma Gamma Tau is the American honor society in aerospace engineering. The society formed from the merger of Tau Omega and Gamma Alpha Rho in 1953. It has chartered more than fifty chapters in the United States. With the merger of the two societies, Sigma Gamma Tau started with fourteen chapters, renamed for their host institution. Following is a list of Sigma Gamma Tau chapters, with inactive institutions indicated in italics.

Charter date and range	Institution	Location	Region	Status	Ref.
February 28, 1953	Purdue University	West Lafayette, Indiana	Great Lakes	Active	(Note: Chapter formed from the Gamma chapter of Gamma Alpha Rho, established in 1947.)
February 28, 1953	Rensselaer Polytechnic Institute	Troy, New York	Northeastern	Active	(Note: Chapter formed from the Alpha chapter of Gamma Alpha Rho, established in 1945.)
February 28, 1953 – 195x?; May 18, 1960	University of Alabama	Tuscaloosa, Alabama	South Central	Active	(Note: Chapter formed from the Epsilon chapter of Gamma Alpha Rho, established in 1948.)
February 28, 1953	University of Illinois Urbana-Champaign	Urbana, Illinois	Great Lakes	Active	(Note: Chapter formed from the Delta chapter of Gamma Alpha Rho, established in 1948.)
February 28, 1953	University of Kansas	Lawrence, Kansas	North Central	Active	(Note: Formed from the Gamma chapter of Tau Gamma, established in 1935.)
February 28, 1953	University of Minnesota	Minneapolis, Minnesota	North Central	Inactive	(Note: Chapter formed from the Epsilon chapter of Tau Omega, established in 1943.)
February 28, 1953	University of Oklahoma	Norman, Oklahoma	Southwestern	Inactive	(Note: Formed from the Alpha chapter of Tau Omega, established in 1927.)
February 28, 1953	Wichita State University	Wichita, Kansas	North Central	Active	(Note: Chapter formed from Beta chapter of Tau Omega, established in 1932.)
February 28, 1953 – 19xx ?; February 6, 1970	Virginia Tech	Blacksburg, Virginia	Mid-Atlantic	Active	(Note: Chapter formed from the Beta chapter of Gamma Alpha Rho, established in 1947.)
February 28, 1953 – 1964	Carnegie Institute of Technology	Pittsburgh, Pennsylvania	Mid-Atlantic	Inactive	(Note: Chapter formed from a chapter of Tau Omega.)
February 28, 1953	Georgia Tech	Atlanta, Georgia	Southeastern	Active	(Note: Chapter formed from the Theta chapter of Tau Omega, established in 1952.)
February 28, 1953	Iowa State University	Ames, Iowa	North Central	Active	(Note: Chapter originated as Zeta chapter of Gamma Alpha Rho in 1949. It merged with the Eta chapter a chapter of Tau Omega, established in 1950.)
February 28, 1953	Massachusetts Institute of Technology	Cambridge, Massachusetts	Northeastern	Inactive	(Note: Chapter formed from the Eta chapter of Gamma Alpha Rho, established in 1949.)
February 28, 1953	Ohio State University	Columbus, Ohio	Great Lakes	Active	(Note: Chapter formed from the Eta chapter of Tau Omega, established in 1949.)
December 11, 1954	West Virginia University	Morgantown, West Virginia	Mid-Atlantic	Active	
December 15, 1955 – 1974	Brooklyn Polytechnic	Brooklyn, New York	Northeastern	Consolidated	(Note: The chapters at Brooklyn Polytechnic and New York University, University Heights consolidated into the Polytechnic Institute of New York in 1974.)
1957	Pennsylvania State University	University Park, Pennsylvania	Mid-Atlantic	Active	
1957	University of Texas at Austin	Austin, Texas	Southwestern	Active	
1957	Texas A&M University	College Station, Texas	Southwestern	Active	
1957–19xx ?; December 20, 1966 – 1974	New York University, University Heights	Bronx, New York City, New York	Northeastern	Consolidated	(Note: Polytechnic Institute)
December 3, 1965	Auburn University	Auburn, Alabama	South Central	Active	
May 1966	University of Maryland, College Park	College Park, Maryland	Mid-Atlantic	Active	
1968	University of Cincinnati	Cincinnati, Ohio	Great Lakes	Inactive	
Before 1970	Saint Louis University	St. Louis, Missouri	North Central	Inactive	(Note: Although the charter date is not included in the organization's list, this chapter hosted the national convention in 1970.)
1970	University of Virginia	Charlottesville, Virginia	Mid-Atlantic	Active	
May 15, 1970	North Carolina State University	Raleigh, North Carolina	Southeastern	Active	
May 18, 1970	University of Texas at Arlington	Arlington, Texas	Southwestern	Inactive	
April 7, 1971	Mississippi State University	Mississippi State, Mississippi	South Central	Active	
February 12, 1974	Missouri University of Science and Technology	Rolla, Missouri	North Central	Active	
May 1974	Northrop University	Inglewood, California	Southern Pacific	Inactive	
May 15, 1974	University of Colorado Boulder	Boulder, Colorado	North Central	Active	
1974	Polytechnic Institute of New York	New York City, New York	Northeastern	Inactive	(Note: Polytechnic Institute)
May 25, 1979	California State Polytechnic University, Pomona	Pomona, California	Southern Pacific	Active	
1979	California Polytechnic State University, San Luis Obispo	San Luis Obispo, California	Southern Pacific	Active	
1980	Embry–Riddle Aeronautical University, Daytona Beach	Daytona Beach, Florida	Southeastern	Active	
1980	San Diego State University	San Diego, California	Southern Pacific	Active	
1981	University of Michigan	Ann Arbor, Michigan	Great Lakes	Active	
1981	University of Notre Dame	Notre Dame, Indiana	Great Lakes	Active	
1983	University of Southern California	Los Angeles, California	Southern Pacific	Inactive	
1983	Syracuse University	Syracuse, New York	Northeastern	Active	
1987	Embry–Riddle Aeronautical University, Prescott	Prescott, Arizona	Western	Active	
1987	University of Tennessee	Knoxville, Tennessee	South Central	Active	
1988	University at Buffalo	Buffalo, New York	Northeastern	Inactive	
1989	University of Florida	Gainesville, Florida	Southeastern	Inactive	
1990	Oklahoma State University	Stillwater, Oklahoma	Southwestern	Active	
1990	Tri-State University	Angola, Indiana	Great Lakes	Inactive	
1992	Arizona State University	Tempe, Arizona	Western	Inactive	
1991	Illinois Institute of Technology	Chicago, Illinois	Great Lakes	Inactive	
1992	San Jose State University	San Jose, California	Western	Inactive	
1992	Air Force Institute of Technology	Dayton, Ohio	Great Lakes	Active	
1992	Boston University	Boston, Massachusetts	Northeastern	Active	
1992	United States Air Force Academy	Colorado Springs, Colorado	North Central	Active	
1994	University of Washington	Seattle, Washington	Western	Active	
1995	Tuskegee University	Tuskegee, Alabama	South Central	Inactive	
2004	University of Central Florida	Orlando, Florida	Southeastern	Active	
2004	Clarkson University	Potsdam, New York	Northeastern	Active	
2005	University of California, Irvine	Irvine, California	Southern Pacific	Active	
2007	University of Alabama in Huntsville	Huntsville, Alabama	South Central	Active	
2008	University of Arizona	Tucson, Arizona	Western	Inactive	
April 29, 2011	Florida Institute of Technology	Melbourne, Florida	Southeastern	Active	
April 2, 2013	Western Michigan University	Kalamazoo, Michigan	Great Lakes	Active	
December 10, 2013	New Mexico State University	Las Cruces, New Mexico	Southwestern	Active	
April 23, 2014 – 2017	Daniel Webster College	Nashua, New Hampshire	Northeastern	Moved	(Note: When the Daniel Webster College closed in 2017, its School of Engineering moved to Southern New Hampshire University. This chapter relocated as well.)
May 3, 2014	California State University, Long Beach	Long Beach, California	Southern Pacific	Active	
April 2017	Worcester Polytechnic Institute	Worcester, Massachusetts	Northeastern	Active	
2017	Southern New Hampshire University	Manchester, New Hampshire	Northeastern	Active	
