= Compression lift =

Phenomenon allowing supersonic aircraft to ride their own shockwave

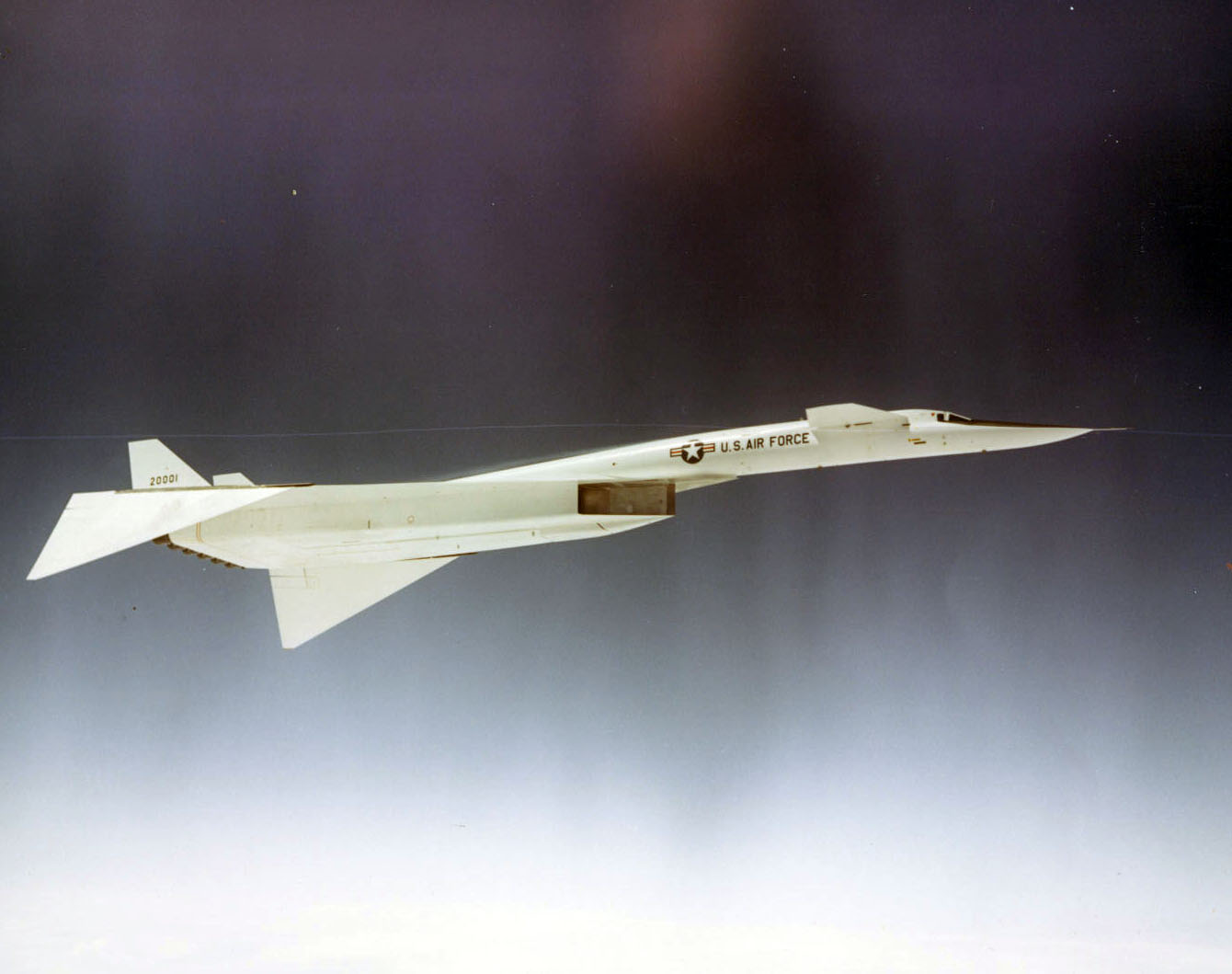
The XB-70 had folding wingtips to enhance both compression lift and directional stability at high speeds.

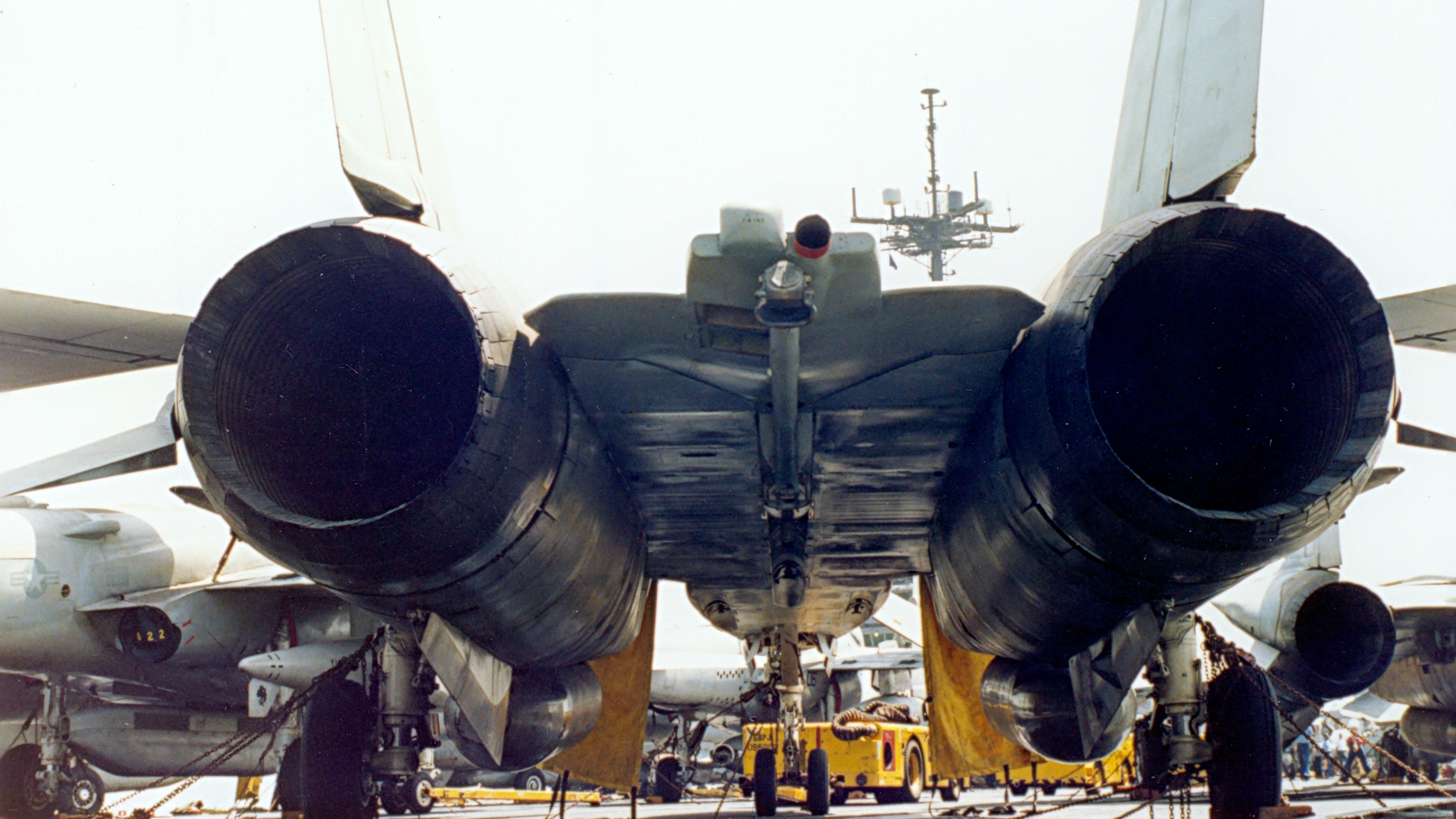
Rear view of the F-14 Tomcat showing the area between the engine nacelles. The area referred as the "pancake" provided compression lift in flight.

In aerodynamics, compression lift refers to the increased pressure under an aircraft that uses shock waves generated by its own supersonic flight to generate lift. This can lead to dramatic improvements in lift for supersonic/hypersonic aircraft. Clarence Syvertson and Alfred J. Eggers discovered this phenomenon in 1956 as they analyzed abnormalities at the reentry of nuclear warheads.

The basic concept of compression lift is well known; "planing" boats reduce drag by "surfing" on their own bow wave in exactly the same fashion. Using this effect in aircraft is more difficult, however, because the "wake" is not generated until supersonic speeds are reached, and is highly angled. Aircraft have to be carefully shaped to take full advantage of this effect. In addition, the angle of the shock waves varies greatly with speed, making it even more difficult to design a craft that gains significant lift over a wide range of speeds.

Higher speed designs using compression lift, waveriders, remain an interesting possibility for hypersonic vehicle designs, although only testbed models have been flown. The Boeing X-51 (Waverider) also uses compression lift.

== See also ==
- Index of aviation articles
