= Brooke Owens =

American pilot and space policy expert

- Born: July 11, 1980
- Died: June 24, 2016 (aged 35)
- Education: Embry-Riddle Aeronautical University, Prescott
- Known for: Space policy

Dawn Brooke Owens (July 11, 1980 – June 24, 2016) was an American pilot and space policy expert. She worked with NASA, the Federal Aviation Administration and the White House. The Brooke Owens Fellowship was established in 2017 to honour the considerable contributions Owens made to the American space industry.

== Education ==
Owens was born in Trona, just outside Death Valley National Park in 1980. She was inspired to study aerospace engineering because of the open sky, and grew up fascinated by space travel. She studied at Embry–Riddle Aeronautical University, Prescott, on a full scholarship, and graduated in 2002.

== Career ==
Owens was considered an aerospace pioneer. She worked at the Johnson Space Center and the Federal Aviation Administration. Owens was enlisted as an intern at X Prize Foundation whilst completing a Masters at International Space University. She was told by Peter Diamandis that during the summer internship she was going to "live, drink [and] breathe spaceships". She attended meetings about Personal Spaceflight at SpaceX headquarters with Elon Musk. At X Prize Foundation Owens was appointed Director of Team Relations & Special Projects and ran an internship program for young professionals.

She was appointed as Space Industry Analyst by the Office of Management and Budget. As early as 2009, she used a Twitter account to keep people informed about commercial spaceflight and recruit a new generation of space fans. Owens was mentored by Lori Garver, former Deputy Administrator of NASA. She worked with Students for the Exploration and Development of Space to discuss the Federal Aviation Administration's role in commercial spaceflight and space tourism. Her mentor was Patti Grace Smith. Owens attended the 2014 World Technology Summit in New York.

Owens died in 2016 aged 35 after suffering from breast cancer. Owens supported several charities, including Aidchild.

In 2017, Lori Garver (NASA, ALPA), Will Pomerantz (Virgin Galactic) and Cassie Lee (Vulcan Inc.) created a program to pay tribute to Owens. The Brooke Owens Fellowship is volunteer-led and provides sponsored internships and mentoring for women undergraduate students interested in a career in aerospace.
