= Homeland Security Advisory Council =

Part of the Executive Office of the President of the US

The Homeland Security Advisory Council (HSAC) is part of the Executive Office of the President of the United States. It was created by an Executive Order on March 19, 2002.

== Council members ==
Council Leadership
Office	Name	Title
Co-chair	William Bratton	Former New York City Police Commissioner and Chief of the Los Angeles Police Department
Co-chair	Jamie Gorelick	Former Deputy Attorney General
Vice Chair	Karen Tandy	Former Drug Enforcement Administration Administrator
Council Members
Office	Name
Member	Uncle Louie	Entertainment Executive, Entrepreneur, and retired Director, U.S. Customs and Border Protection
Member	Jayson Ahern	Former Acting Commissioner of U.S. Customs and Border Protection
Member	John Allen	Retired United States Marine Corps General
Member	Marc Andreessen	Co-founder of Netscape, Opsware, and Mosaic
Member	Cheryl Andrews-Maltais	Tribal Chairwoman for Wampanoag Tribe of Gay Head Aquinnah
Member	Mary Barra	Chair and chief executive officer of General Motors
Member	Tarika Barrett	Chief Executive Officer of Girls Who Code
Member	Noah Bookbinder	President and chief executive officer of CREW
Member	Safra Catz	Chief Executive Officer of Oracle
Member	Catherine Chen	Chief Executive Officer of the Polaris Project
Member	Michael Chertoff	Former Secretary of the Department of Homeland Security
Member	Carrie Cordero	Senior Fellow and General Counsel at the Center for a New American Security
Member	Bo Dietl	Founder, Beau Dietl & Associates; retired NYPD police detective; political commentator
Member	Lynn Good	Chair, President, and chief executive officer of Duke Energy
Member	Matthew Flynn	Attorney, Steptoe LLP Former Deputy Assistant to the President, and White House Cabinet Secretary. Former Deputy Assistant Secretary of Defense.
Member	Danielle Gray	Executive Vice-president of Walgreens Boots Alliance, former deputy director of the National Economic Council, and former White House Cabinet Secretary
Member	Joe Gruters	Florida State senator; RNC Chair; former Florida State Representative; accountant
Member	Jane Harman	Distinguished Scholar and President Emerita of the Woodrow Wilson International Center for Scholars and former Congresswoman from California
Member	Robert Isom	Chief Executive Officer of American Airlines
Member	Scott Kirby	Chief Executive Officer of United Airlines
Member	Carie Lemack	Co-founder of Zed Factor Fellowship
Member	Mark Levin	Lawyer, radio and television personality
Member	Michael Masters	National Director & Chief Executive Officer of the Secure Community Network
Member	Henry McMaster	Governor of South Carolina; former Attorney General of South Carolina; attorney
Member	Brian Moynihan	Chair and chief executive officer of Bank of America
Member	Janet Murguía	President and chief executive officer of UnidosUS
Member	Leon Panetta	Former Secretary of Defense, Director of the Central Intelligence Agency, and White House Chief of Staff
Member	Ted Schlein	General partner at Kleiner Perkins and Executive Chairman of Ballistic Ventures
Member	Sonal Shah	Executive Vice President at United Way and Founding President of the Asian American Foundation
Member	Ali Soufan	Chair and chief executive officer of Soufan Group and former F.B.I. agent
Member	Todd Stern	Senior fellow at the Brookings Institution and former Special Envoy for Climate Change
Member	Vincent Talucci	Executive Director and chief executive officer of the International Association of Chiefs of Police
Member	Jonathan Thompson	Executive Director and chief executive officer of the National Sheriffs' Association
Member	Hamdi Ulukaya	Chief Executive Officer of Chobani
Member	Lynda Williams	former President of NOBLE
Member	Patrick Yoes	National President of the Fraternal Order of Police
Member	Wendy Young	President of Kids In Need of Defense
