= Gerald Soffen =

Gerald A. Soffen
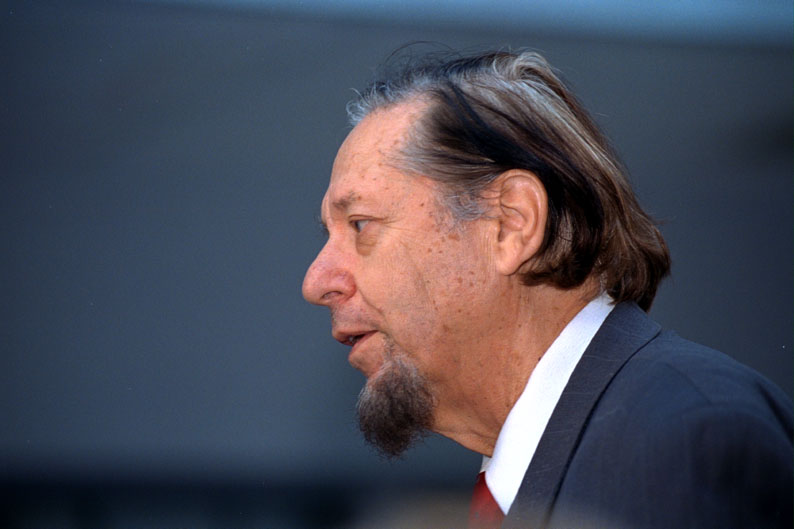
- Gerald A. Soffen, from NASA Archives
- Born: February 7, 1926; Cleveland, Ohio, US
- Died: November 22, 2000 (aged 74); Washington, D.C., US
- Occupations: Life Scientist and Educator

Gerald A. Soffen (February 7, 1926 – November 22, 2000) was a NASA scientist and educator who served in a wide variety of roles for the space agency, primarily dealing with either education or with life sciences—especially the search for life on Mars.

He earned his A.B.S. from the University of California, Los Angeles, his M.S. from University of Southern California, and his Ph.D. in Biology from Princeton University. He pursued his postdoctoral work at New York University.

Working from NASA's Langley Research Center in the mid- to late-1970s, Soffen was project scientist for the NASA's Viking program of Mars landers, the first successful missions to perform unmanned experiments on the surface of the planet. In that role, he oversaw all scientific investigations conducted by the landers, coordinating the work of more than seventy scientists around the nation. In 1977, he appeared on an episode of the popular television series In Search Of entitled "Martians" and he spoke about the Viking's findings up to that time. "We have started what will become an adventure of mankind in searching for not only the lower forms of life but also the search for intelligent life. This is one of the milestones in the course of human destiny to find cousins". Soffen also predicted that mankind would eventually colonize Mars by using Planetary Engineering.

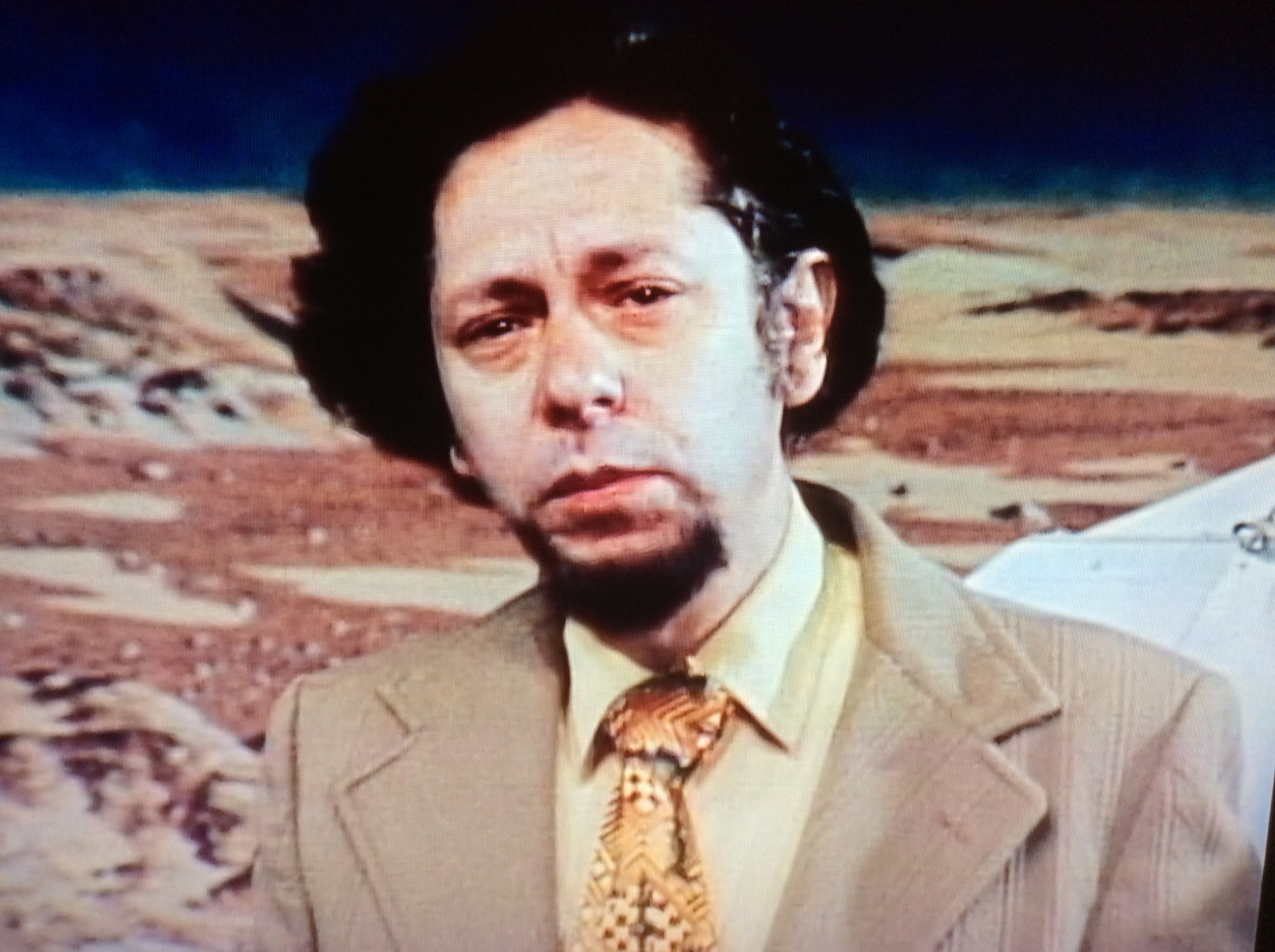
Gerald Soffen in 1977 appearing on the TV show In Search of...

He moved to become NASA Langley's Chief Environmental Scientist in 1968, leading work on remote sensing by satellite as well as laboratory experiments, ground-based measurements, and theoretical models.

In 1978, after concluding his work with Viking, Soffen became the director of Life Sciences at NASA Headquarters. In this position, Soffen was responsible for the agency-wide program to monitor and maintain the physical well being of NASA astronauts in space, as well as the Biomedical Program, the Space Biology Program, and the Exobiology (also sometimes called the Astrobiology) program. He was compared by some to Carl Sagan. Like Sagan, Soffen spoke cogently, succinctly, and poetically about our search for life beyond earth.

In 1983, Soffen transferred from NASA Headquarters to NASA Goddard Space Flight Center (GSFC) in Greenbelt, Maryland. Initially, his role at GSFC focused on establishing the "Mission to Planet Earth" program; Soffen also served as the project scientist for NASA's Earth Observing System as that program was starting.

Soffen's focus shifted to education starting in 1990, when he led the formation of GSFC's University Programs office and became its manager. Three years into that role, Soffen created NASA Academy, NASA's premiere leadership training internship. During 1990–1992, he served on the Science Advisory Committee for Biosphere 2.

== Recognition ==
Soffen has been memorialized in several ways by his peers and former students. The "Dr. Gerald A. Soffen Memorial Fund for the Advancement of Space Science Education" was established by the NASA Academy Alumni Association "to continue Jerry's commitment to the future of space by supporting motivated students in the fields of space science and engineering". The "Gerald Soffen Memorial Panel/Lecture" is also a feature of the annual Space Studies program conducted by International Space University.

The Viking 2 lander was posthumously named after Soffen. Additionally, a crater on Mars was named "Soffen" in 2006. The crater is centered at 23.73 degrees S, 140.86 degrees E on Mars.
