= Brooke Owens Fellowship =

American space-related internship program

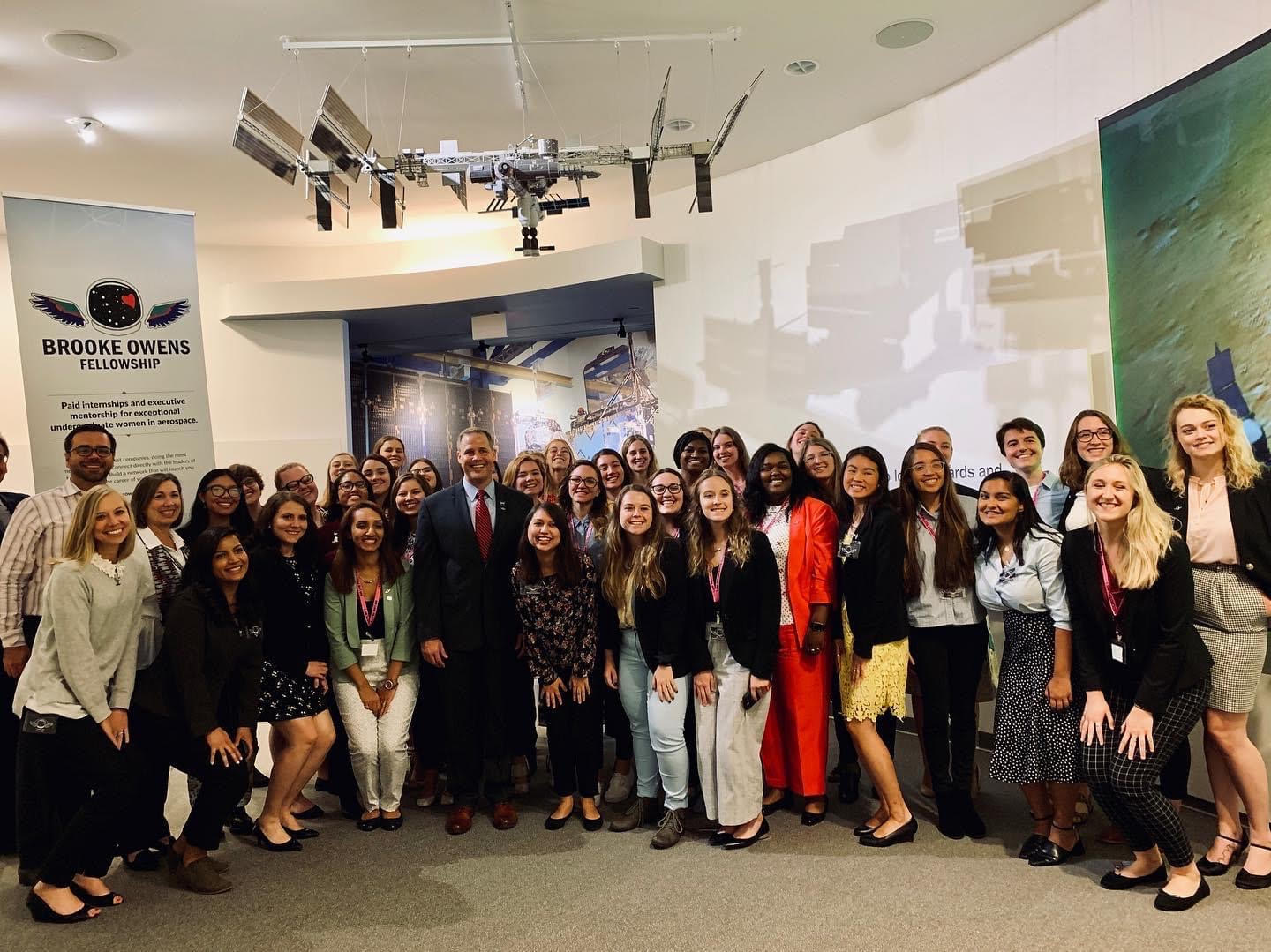
- Brooke Owens Fellowship Class of 2019
- Awarded for: Exceptional undergraduate women and gender minority students in aerospace
- Country: United States
- First award: 2017
- Final award: 2024
- Website: brookeowensfellowship.org

The Brooke Owens Fellowship is a non-profit program in the United States that provides paid internships and executive mentorship for undergraduate women seeking a career in aviation or space exploration. The fellowship was created to honor the memory of Brooke Owens, a pilot and space policy expert who died of cancer at the age of 35.

== Overview ==
The program looks to improve diversity within the aerospace industry and offers students paid summer internships at companies (including SpaceX, Avascent, Commercial Spaceflight Federation, Orbital ATK, Virgin Orbit, and Blue Origin), travel stipends, and assigned mentors. It was created by Lori Garver, a former NASA deputy administrator, along with aerospace executives William Pomerantz (Virgin Orbit) and Cassie Kloberdanz Lee (Vulcan Inc.).

Fellows receive two experienced aerospace mentors, one at their host industry, and another in an associated sector. Mentors include Lori Garver, Diana Trujillo, Charles Bolden, Pamela Melroy, Dava Newman, Danielle Wood, Emily Calandrelli, Will Pomerantz and Cassie Lee. The fellows are connected to a Fellowship class and an alumni network. The program is run with Future Space Leaders, and emphasizes creativity. The annual Brooke Owens Fellowship conference happens during the Future Space Conference in Washington, D.C. Whilst the program is open to international students, some institutions can only host US citizens or green card holders.

The program's success has resulted in the creation of several spin-off fellowships, including the Matthew Isakowitz Fellowship, Patti Grace Smith Fellowship, Zed Factor Fellowship, and Zenith Canada Pathways Fellowship.

== Alumni ==
As of 2024, the Brooke Owens Fellowship has 343 alumnae across eight cohorts. Fellows span fields from engineering and science to policy, journalism, and entrepreneurship.

=== Inaugural Class of 2017 ===
- Jocelyn Clancy, (University of Southern California) — The Aerospace Corporation
- Katherine Carroll (University of Illinois, Urbana-Champaign) — The Aerospace Corporation
- Makiah Eustice (Texas A&M University) — The Aerospace Corporation
- Maryam Gracias (Embry-Riddle Aeronautical University) — Air Line Pilots Association
- Rachael McKee (Metropolitan State University of Denver) — Air Line Pilots Association
- Shreya Udupa (Arizona State University) — Altius Space Machines
- Morgan Irons (Duke University) — Avascent
- Mady Sargent (University of Kansas) — Ball Aerospace
- Taylor Zedosky (University of South Carolina) — Ball Aerospace
- Golda Nguyen (Georgia Institute of Technology) — Blue Origin
- Amy Comeau (Purdue University) — Bryce Space and Technology
- Caroline Juang (Harvard University) — Bryce Space and Technology
- Emily Sheffield (Harding University) — Commercial Spaceflight Federation
- Chelsey Ballarte (Arizona State University) — GeekWire
- Michaela Spaulding (Iowa State University) — Generation Orbit
- Karen Rucker (Texas Tech University) — HawkEye 360
- Maggie Goertzen (University of Utah) — Made In Space
- Hayley Lewis (Embry-Riddle Aeronautical University) — Mojave Air and Space Port
- Jasmine Q. Smith (Tuskegee University) — Mojave Air and Space Port
- Kaitlin Engelbert (University of Colorado, Boulder) — The Museum of Flight
- Pau Pineda Bosque (Purdue University) — Orbital ATK
- Sumayya Abukhalil (University of Central Florida) — Orbital ATK
- Maddie Miller (Union College) — Planet Labs
- Becca Thoss (University of Southern California) — Planetary Resources
- Dahlia Baker (Coe College) — Planetary Resources
- Karen Kuhlman (Oregon State University) — Scaled Composites
- Amanda Turk (University of Colorado, Boulder) — Sierra Nevada Corporation
- Justine Walker (College of Wooster) — Sierra Nevada Corporation
- Dawn Andrews (Georgia Institute of Technology) — SpaceX
- Roselin Campos (University of California, Los Angeles) — Space Sciences Laboratory
- Christine Reilly (University of Colorado, Boulder) — Virgin Orbit
- Diana Alsindy (University of California, San Diego) — Virgin Orbit
- Ninoshka Llontop Lozano (University of Illinois at Chicago) — Virgin Orbit
- Piper Sigrest (Massachusetts Institute of Technology) — Virgin Orbit
- Christine Chappelle (Massachusetts Institute of Technology) — Vulcan Aerospace
- Sasha Warren (Durham University (UK)) — XPRIZE
