= Zonta International =

International service organization

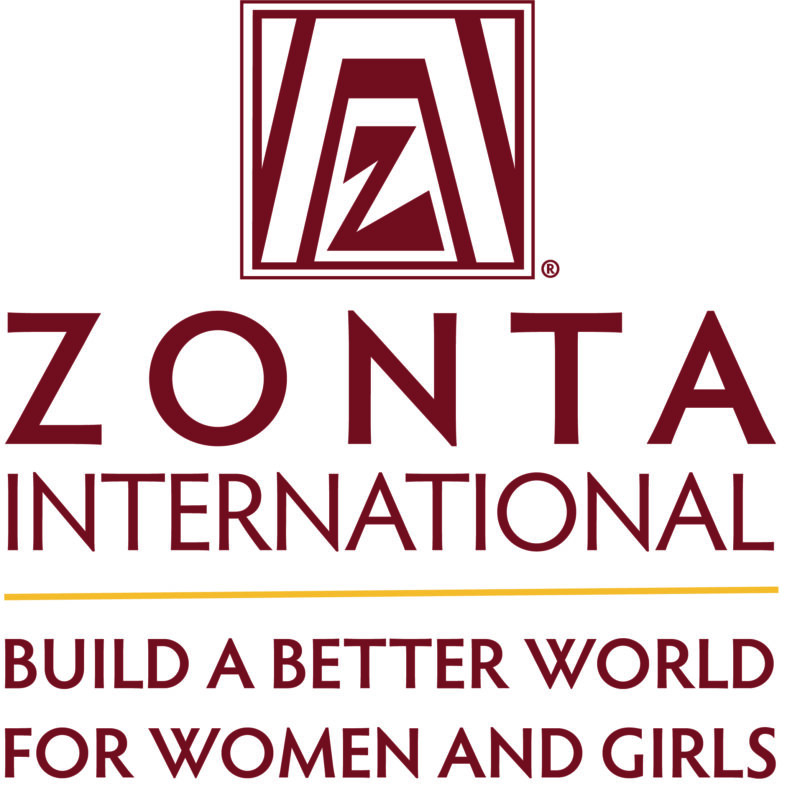
- Zonta International emblem
- Formation: 1919
- Type: Service club
- Headquarters: Oak Brook, Illinois, United States
- Location: Global
- Members: 29,000+
- Key people: Marian de Forest (founder) Amelia Earhart (member) Helvi Sipilä (International President 1968), Leticia Ramos Shahani (member)
- Website: www.zonta.org/

Zonta International is an international service organization with the mission of Building a Better World for Women and Girls, in support of Sustainable Development Goal 5.

== History ==
The first Zonta Club was founded in Buffalo, New York, United States, in 1919 by a group of businesswomen under the leadership of Marian de Forest. It was organized along the lines of the Rotary Club, with one woman from each business classification admitted to the local club and all members required to give 60% of their time to the "work under which they are classified". Membership into Zonta International was a process, had strict membership regulations, and was considered a privilege. To become a member of Zonta International, one must have been a woman of high standing in her career field. By 1923 clubs had been established in New York City, Washington, D.C., Detroit, Cleveland, and Toledo, Ohio. The National President was Miss Harriet A. Ackroyd of Utica, New York. In 1926, aviator Amelia Earhart became a member of the Boston chapter. Earhart later transferred to the New York City Zonta chapter. Her sister, Muriel Morrissey, was also a Zonta member.

The Confederation of Zonta Clubs was formed in 1930 and expanded internationally, changing the name to Zonta International, with the founding of the Vienna club in 1930. Currently, Zonta International and the Zonta Foundation for Women is headquartered in Oak Brook, Illinois. Notable Zonta International leaders have served in significant positions in the U.N. Member Helvi Sipila of Finland served as International President of Zonta prior to her service as Assistant Secretary General of the UN, and Zonta member Leticia Ramos Shahani of the Philippines also served as Assistant Secretary General of the UN.

Zonta International today: The organization has more than 29,000 members in 62 countries. Zonta International has consultative status with the Council of Europe, the United Nations (UN), ILO, and several UN agencies.

The organization's name derives from the Lakota zónta meaning "honest" or "trustworthy".

== Working as a NGO to Build a Better World for Women and Girls ==
Zonta International was granted General Consultative Status at the UN in 1969. As an NGO with General Consultative Status, Zonta International is invited to participate in the annual Commission on the Status of Women (CSW) in New York, and partners to help achieve SDG 5. Zonta International is accredited as a NGO at the UN office at Geneva. Zonta member Simone Ovart served as NGO CSW Geneva president 2015-2018, and held many roles in UN Geneva NGO events. Zonta International hosts and collaborates at CSW to sponsor events and parallel events highlighting relevant topics, including, with UNICEF USA organized two CSW 2019 parallel events, Achieving Sustainable Impact: Gender Equity Through Social Protections Is Imperative and Making It Stick: Sustainable Impact for Girls Through Innovation, Social Protection and Capacity-Building, respectively.

Zonta International joined the global campaign for Women's Rights in 1993, supporting the petition After Vienna and on to Beijing.

== International Service Projects ==
Over the last century, Zonta has contributed more than US$45.9 million to empower women and girls and expand their access to education, health care, economic opportunities, and safe living conditions. The 2020-2022 grant cycle will provide US$5,280,000 for programs that address the root causes of gender discrimination and have the potential to bring about positive and sustainable societal changes. Through its long standing partnership with UNICEF, Zonta International and the Zonta Foundation for Women have been supporting UNICEF to advance the status of women and girls worldwide through education, health and protection services. Since its creation, Zonta International has provided more than US$13 million to UNICEF to empower women and girls and expand their access to education, health care, economic opportunities and safe living conditions.

== Zonta International Focus Areas ==
=== Ending Child Marriage ===
Zonta International began a commitment to work through its branches throughout the world to End Child Marriage. It has been a committed supporter to the UNFPA-UNICEF Global Program to End Child Marriage. Zonta USA and UNICEF USA have a Public Service program. Stopchildmarriages.org to educate citizens the USA about the prevalence of child marriage, in collaboration with the non profit Unchained at Last. In addition, Zonta USA sits on the Steering committee of the National Coalition to End Child Marriage in the United States.

=== Zonta Says NO - Ending Violence Against Women ===
Since 2012, Zonta has expanded its international Campaign, Zonta Says NO, an international campaign to raise awareness of and increase actions to end violence against women and girls around the world. This signature campaign features actions to prevent and end violence against women and girls in the communities of Zonta International’s more than 62 countries worldwide.

Over the past five years Zonta has contributed more than USD 3 million towards UN Women efforts to end violence against women and girls around the world.

Zonta International joined forces with UN women to End Violence Against women thru their Safe Cities projects.

=== Zonta Says NOW! Climate Action with a Gender Lens ===
in 2022 Zonta adopted Gender equal climate action with a new International program "Zonta Says NOW". Introduced at convention, and further unveiled to the world at CSW67 side event "Zonta Says NOW to Gender Equality and Climate Action", in line with UN focus that "the climate crisis is a human rights crisis" - Antonino Guterres. Empowering Girls on Climate Change: In 2022, Zonta began supporting Engaging Girls on Climate Change in Madagascar.

=== Ratifying the Equal Rights Amendment ===
Zonta Clubs and Members in the USA are members of the ERA Coalition, continuing to advocate for constitutional equality for Women in the USA, even after 100 years.

=== End Human Trafficking ===
Trafficking in Persons is a human rights abuse. Eliminating human trafficking is critical to enabling women to achieve their full potential and live without fear of exploitation and violence. Zonta clubs around the world educate and collaborate in their communities with law enforcement and survivors of human trafficking.

== Educational programs and awards ==
Zonta International, through its Foundation: Zonta Foundation for Women (formerly the Zonta International Foundation), seeks to provide opportunities for women through a number of educational programs and awards.

=== Amelia Earhart Fellowship ===
Established in 1938 in honor of famed pilot and Zontian Amelia Earhart, the Amelia Earhart Fellowship is awarded annually to women pursuing Ph.D./doctoral degrees in aerospace-related sciences or aerospace-related engineering. The Fellowship of US$10,000, awarded to 35 Fellows around the globe each year, may be used at any university or college offering accredited post-graduate courses and degrees in these fields. Since its inception, Zonta International has awarded 1,473 Amelia Earhart Fellowships to 1,044 women from 70 countries across the globe.

Amelia Earhart Fellowship recipients include:

- Noël Bakhtian
- Sallie Baliunas
- Tanya Harrison
- Nikhil Koratkar
- Diane Lemaire
- Wendy Okolo

=== Jane M. Klausman Women in Business Scholarship ===
The Jane M. Klausman Women in Business Scholarship program helps women to pursue undergraduate and master's degrees in business management and to overcome gender barriers from the classroom to the boardroom. Since the program's inception, Zonta has awarded 357 scholarships to women from 47 countries.

Recipients include:

Tressa Lacy

=== Young Women in Public Affairs Award Program ===
Zonta International's Young Women in Public Affairs Award honors young women aged from 16 to 19 with a scholarship. Awardees are selected from applicants who demonstrate a commitment to leadership in public policy, government and volunteer organizations, particularly on behalf of women and girls.

=== Z and Golden Z Clubs ===
Established in 1948, the Z Club and Golden Z Club program is one of Zonta International's longest-running programs. Z clubs and Golden Z clubs help high-school, college and university students develop leadership skills, promote career exploration and encourage members to participate in community, school and international service projects.
