= Diana Trujillo =

Colombian-American aerospace engineer

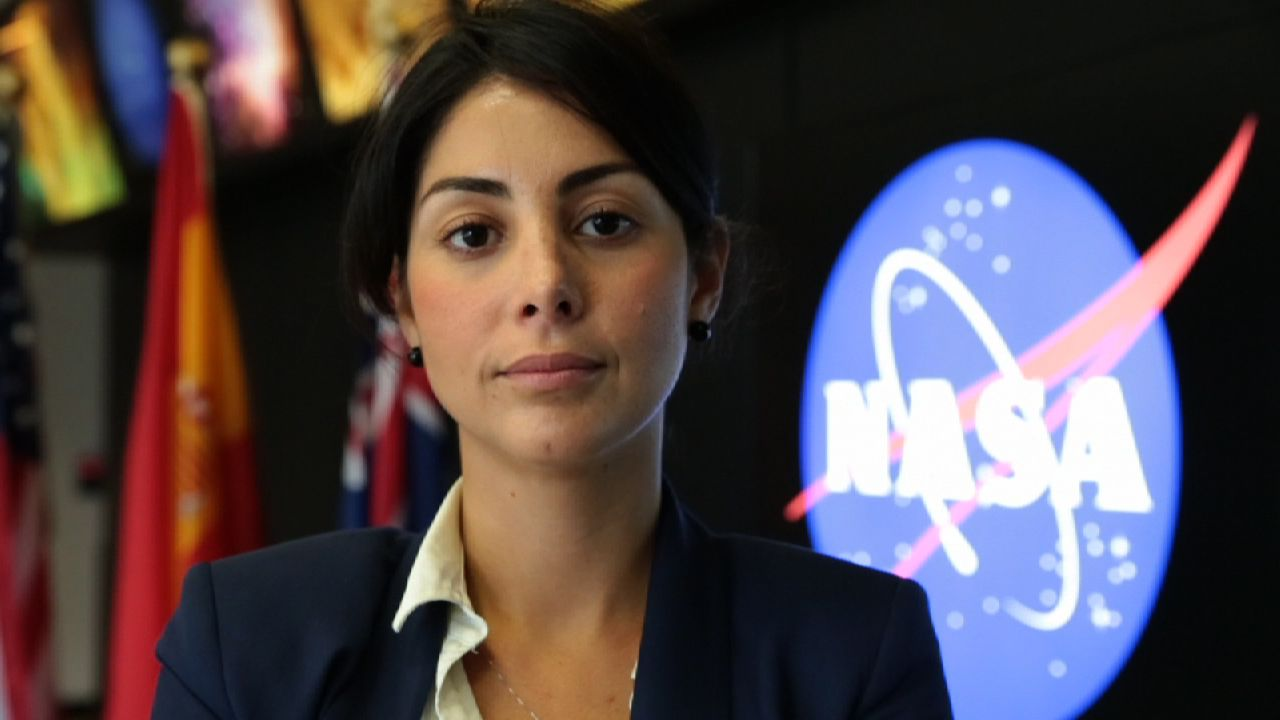
- Born: Diana Trujillo; 1983 January 4th Cali, Colombia
- Education: Miami Dade College; University of Florida; University of Maryland, College Park
- Known for: Mars Curiosity Rover, Mars 2020
- Spouse: William Pomerantz (m. 2009)
- Children: 2
- Scientific career
- Workplaces: Jet Propulsion Laboratory; Goddard Space Flight Center

Lady Diana Trujillo Pomerantz (born 1983) is a Colombian-American aerospace engineer at the NASA Jet Propulsion Laboratory. She currently leads the engineering team at JPL responsible for the robotic arm of the Perseverance rover. On February 18, 2021, Trujillo hosted the first ever Spanish-language NASA transmission of a planetary landing, for the Perseverance rover landing on Mars.

== Early life and education ==
Trujillo was born in 1983, in Cali, Colombia. Her mother was a medical student when she got pregnant and had to leave her studies to look after her daughter. Trujillo attended Colegio Internacional Cañaverales, a bilingual school accredited by the International Baccalaureate, formerly the International Baccalaureate Organization (IBO). During her school years, she had an interest in science and questioned the roles that are traditionally associated with women.

Uncertain but determined to overcome the economic difficulties that her family faced in Colombia, Trujillo moved to the United States at the age of seventeen with only $300. In order to improve her language skills, she started English lessons at Miami Dade College while working as a housekeeper, among other jobs.

Trujillo enrolled initially at the University of Florida to pursue studies in aerospace engineering, inspired by a magazine article about the role of women working on aerospace missions and having self-confidence in her strong mathematical skills. While studying at the university, she decided to apply for the NASA Academy, being the first Hispanic immigrant woman admitted to the program. She was one of the two participants to get a job offer from NASA. During her work at the Academy, she met NASA robots expert Brian Roberts, who convinced her to move to Maryland with the aim of increasing her chances in the Aerospace industry. Trujillo attended the University of Maryland where she was part of Roberts' research team, focusing on robots in space operations. In 2007, she earned a bachelor's degree in Aerospace Engineering from the University of Maryland. Her story was turned into a children's science book titled "Mars Science Lab - Engineer" by Kari Cornell and Fatima Khan. She was a member of Sigma Gamma Tau.

== Career ==
Trujillo joined NASA in 2007, working at Goddard Space Flight Center on the Constellation program and the Jet Propulsion Laboratory on human and robotic space missions. She has served many roles, including Surface Sampling System Activity Lead and Dust Removal Tool Lead Systems Engineer. She was responsible for ensuring Curiosity's sampling fulfilled its science objectives dust-free whilst maintaining operational safety. The Dust Removal Tool took her six months to develop, and brushes the dust of the surface of Mars to allow scientists to investigate the surface below. It was used on Curiosity's 151st day on Mars. In 2009 she was appointed telecom systems engineer for the Curiosity Rover. Trujillo was responsible for the communications between the spacecraft and scientists on Earth. She has also been Flight Ground Systems Engineer and Vehicle System Testbed Mars Surface Lead. She was at the Jet Propulsion Laboratory when the rover landed on Mars. In 2014, Trujillo was promoted to Mission Lead. That year, she was listed as in the 20 most influential Latinos in the Technology Industry.

Trujillo worked as flight director on the Mars 2020 Perseverance Rover robotic arm and in February 2021, she hosted NASA's first Spanish-language planetary landing show.

She has been involved in several initiatives to inspire young women from Latin America and African-American women to pursue a career in science and engineering. She took part in a discussion about Hidden Figures at the University of Southern California alongside Octavia Spencer and Pharrell Williams. She has been a mentor for the Brooke Owens Fellowship, which she created with her husband Will Pomerantz.

In June 2020, Trujillo was appointed to the Brooke Owens Fellowship's Executive Board She was awarded the Jet Propulsion Laboratory Bruce Murray Award for Excellence in Education and Public Engagement. She was featured on CBS' 2018 celebration of Women's History Month.

== Personal life ==
Trujillo married Will Pomerantz in 2009. They have two children.

== Awards ==
- 2011 Shared the STEM Award from the Hispanic Heritage Foundation.
- 2021 Awarded the rank of Commander (Comendador) in the Order of Boyaca, the highest honor that can be awarded to Colombian citizens for exceptional service to Colombia
- 2021 Awarded by the Congress of Colombia the order of merit Policarpa Salavarrieta on March 8, 2021.
- 2019 City of STEM Icon Award.
- 2017 Named one of Los 22 Más by the Colombian Embassy in the United States.
- 2017 Bruce Murray Award for Excellence in Education and Public Management.
- 2023 Lepanthes dianatrujilloana, a species of orchid, was named after her.
