= Helvi Sipilä =

Finnish politician, lawyer and diplomat (1915–2009)

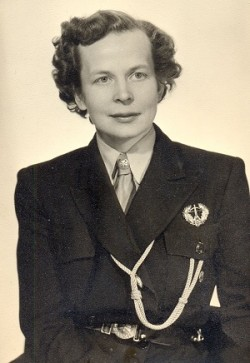
- Sipilä in the 1950s when she was a chief of the Finnish girl scouts organization
- Born: 5 May 1915; Helsinki, Grand Duchy of Finland
- Died: 15 May 2009 (aged 94); Helsinki, Finland
- Burial place: Kärkölä, Finland

Helvi Linnea Aleksandra Sipilä (née Maukola; 5 May 1915 – 15 May 2009) was a Finnish diplomat, lawyer and politician. She was known as a promoter of women's rights, and was the first-ever female Assistant-Secretary-General of the United Nations. When Sipilä was appointed Assistant-Secretary-General in 1972, 97 per cent of United Nations senior management (D1 and above) was male. Sipilä also held a number of leadership positions in international civic organizations, including in the World Association of Girl Guides and Girl Scouts, the International Federation of Women Lawyers, Zonta International and the International Council of Women.

Sipilä began her career as a lawyer and opened her own legal office in 1943. As a UN Assistant Secretary-General, she was in charge of the Center for Social Development and Humanitarian Affairs from 1972 to her retirement from the post in 1980. She organized the first World Conference on Women in 1975 and had a great influence on the United Nations' decision to celebrate the Decade for Women and establish the Development Fund for Women (UNIFEM) in 1976.

In 1982, Sipilä became the first woman to run for President of Finland, as a candidate of the Liberal People's Party. She held twelve honorary doctorates and was granted the title of Minister in 2001.
