= Will Pomerantz =

American scientist

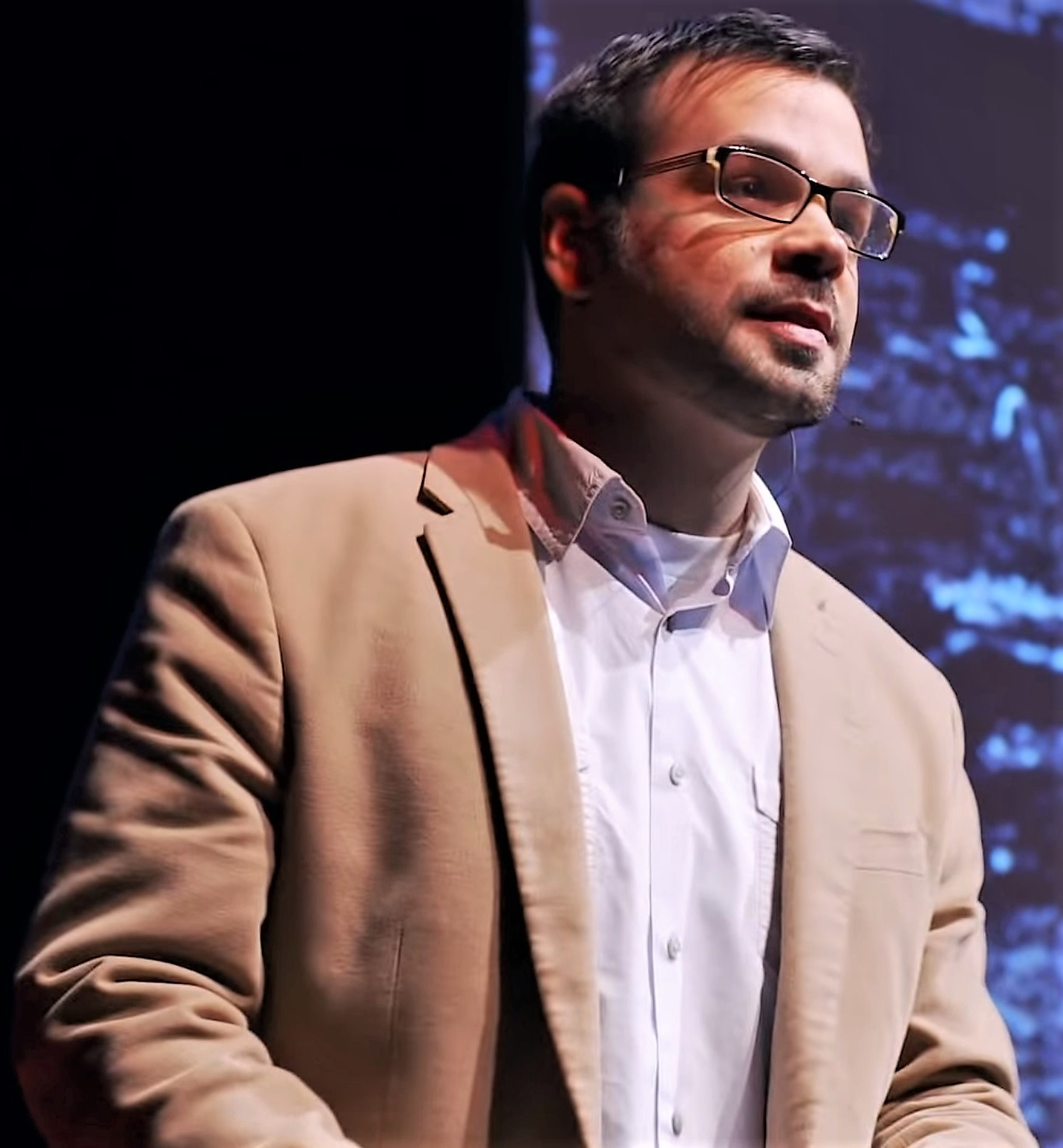
- Pomerantz speaks on space travel at TEDxPCC in 2013
- Education: Harvard University; International Space University; NASA Academy
- Employer(s): X Prize Foundation; Virgin Galactic; Virgin Orbit
- Organization: Brooke Owens Fellowship
- Spouse: Diana Trujillo (m. 2009)
- Children: 2

William Pomerantz is Vice President of Special Projects at Virgin Orbit. He was part of the team that created Virgin Orbit while working at Virgin Galactic. He is the co-founder of the Brooke Owens Fellowship and a trustee of the United States Students for the Exploration and Development of Space organisation.

== Early life and education ==
Pomerantz was born in 1980 in Buffalo, New York. His parents are Sandra Pomerantz, a social worker and lawyer, and James Pomerantz, a cognitive psychologist. His step-mother is Mary McIntire, Dean of Continuing Studies at Rice University. Pomerantz studied Earth and planetary sciences at Harvard University. During his undergraduate degree he studied at the NASA Academy. He completed a master's degree at the International Space University, working in the Information, Communication and Space Technology group at the United Nations Economic and Social Commission for Asia and the Pacific. Pomerantz co-founded the website SpaceAlumni with Nicholas Skytland in 2004, a social media platform for young space professionals, acting as chief editor until 2007. He worked at Brown University as a planetary scientist, identifying surface features on Mars.

== Career ==
After graduate school Pomerantz joined Futron, an aerospace consultancy that eventually became acquired by Avascent.

In 2005 Pomerantz joined X Prize Foundation, acting as Director of Space Prizes. He was promoted to Senior Director of Space Projects and helped to create both the Google Lunar X Prize and Northrop Grumman Lunar Lander Challenge.

In 2010, Pomerantz contributed a chapter to the textbook Space Commerce. He joined Virgin Galactic in 2011 and was appointed vice president. He was determined to use the SpaceShipTwo to support educational and research payloads as well as space tourism.

He spoke at the 2013 TEDxPCC at the Expanding Horizons of Understanding event, where he discussed why humans explore space. Pomerantz led the effort to launch the LauncherOne, which allows people to launch small satellites from an air-launched system. He was the first employee of Virgin Orbit, which will 3D print rockets and engines for satellite launches.

In 2024, he was selected as a Karman Fellow by The Karman Project for his work in space exploration. His wife is the NASA Jet Propulsion Laboratory engineer Diana Trujillo.

=== Public service and advocacy ===
He has advised the National Academies of Sciences, Engineering, and Medicine and Federal Aviation Administration. He was a judge at the inaugural Mayor of Los Angeles Cup, an entrepreneurship challenge to improve Los Abgeles for citizens. He has written for HuffPost. Pomerantz is the chair of the Board of Advisors for the American organisation Students for the Exploration and Development of Space and on the advisory board for the Waypaver Foundation. He is on the editorial board of Room, the space journal.

In 2016, Pomerantz established the Brooke Owens Fellowship, a mentoring scheme which champions women in aerospace. The fellowships offer undergraduate women positions in the space sector and assigns them a personal mentor working in industry. He co-founded the fellowship with Lori Garver and Cassie Kloberdanz Lee.
