= Lepanthes dianatrujilloana =

Scientific classification
- Kingdom: Plantae
- Clade: Tracheophytes
- Clade: Angiosperms
- Clade: Monocots
- Order: Asparagales
- Family: Orchidaceae
- Subfamily: Epidendroideae
- Genus: Lepanthes
- Species: L. dianatrujilloana

Binomial name
- Lepanthes dianatrujilloana J.S.Moreno, Gal.-Tar., Sierra-Ariza & Zuluaga

Species of flowering plant

Lepanthes dianatrujilloana is a species of flowering plant in the family Orchidaceae. It is an epiphyte with green to red leaves, with maroon, red, and orange flowers. The species is native to Colombia, and was described in 2023.

== Taxonomy ==
Lepanthes dianatrujilloana was described in 2023, by Juan Sebastián Moreno, Robinson Galindo-Tarazona, Mario Alexei Sierra-Ariza, and Alejandro Zuluaga.

== Distribution ==
Lepanthes dianatrujilloana is native to the wet tropical biome of Colombia.

== Description ==
Lepanthes dianatrujilloana is an epiphyte. It grows 6.1–11.9 centimetres (2.4–4.7 in) tall. The roots and stems are slender, and the stems are 2.5–5.7 centimetres (0.98–2.24 in) long.

The leaves are green to red, leathery, elliptic-lanceolate, 2.8–4.1 centimetres (1.1–1.6 in) long, and 0.8–4.1 centimetres (0.31–1.61 in) wide. The base is contracted into a 2.6–4.2 millimetres (0.10–0.17 in) long stem.

The inflorescence is a 1.9–2.2 centimetres (0.75–0.87 in) long raceme. The inflorescence stem is 1.1–1.4 millimetres (0.043–0.055 in) long. The sepals are maroon, and have maroon-red midveins. The dorsal sepal is ovate, and 2.7–4.0 millimetres (0.11–0.16 in) by 1.9–3.0 millimetres (0.075–0.118 in) in size. The lateral sepals are ovate, 2.3–3.3 millimetres (0.091–0.130 in) long, and 1.2–1.9 millimetres (0.047–0.075 in) wide. The petals have red and orange lobes. The petals are narrowly elliptical, 1.0–1.2 millimetres (0.039–0.047 in) long, and 0.3–0.4 millimetres (0.012–0.016 in) wide. The lip is red-magenta, thick, narrowly elliptical, and flat. The column is purple.

Lepanthes dianatrujilloana is similar to Lepanthes volvox.

== Etymology ==
Lepanthes dianatrujilloana is named after Diana Trujillo, a Colombian aerospace engineer.
