= Noël Bakhtian =

American scientist

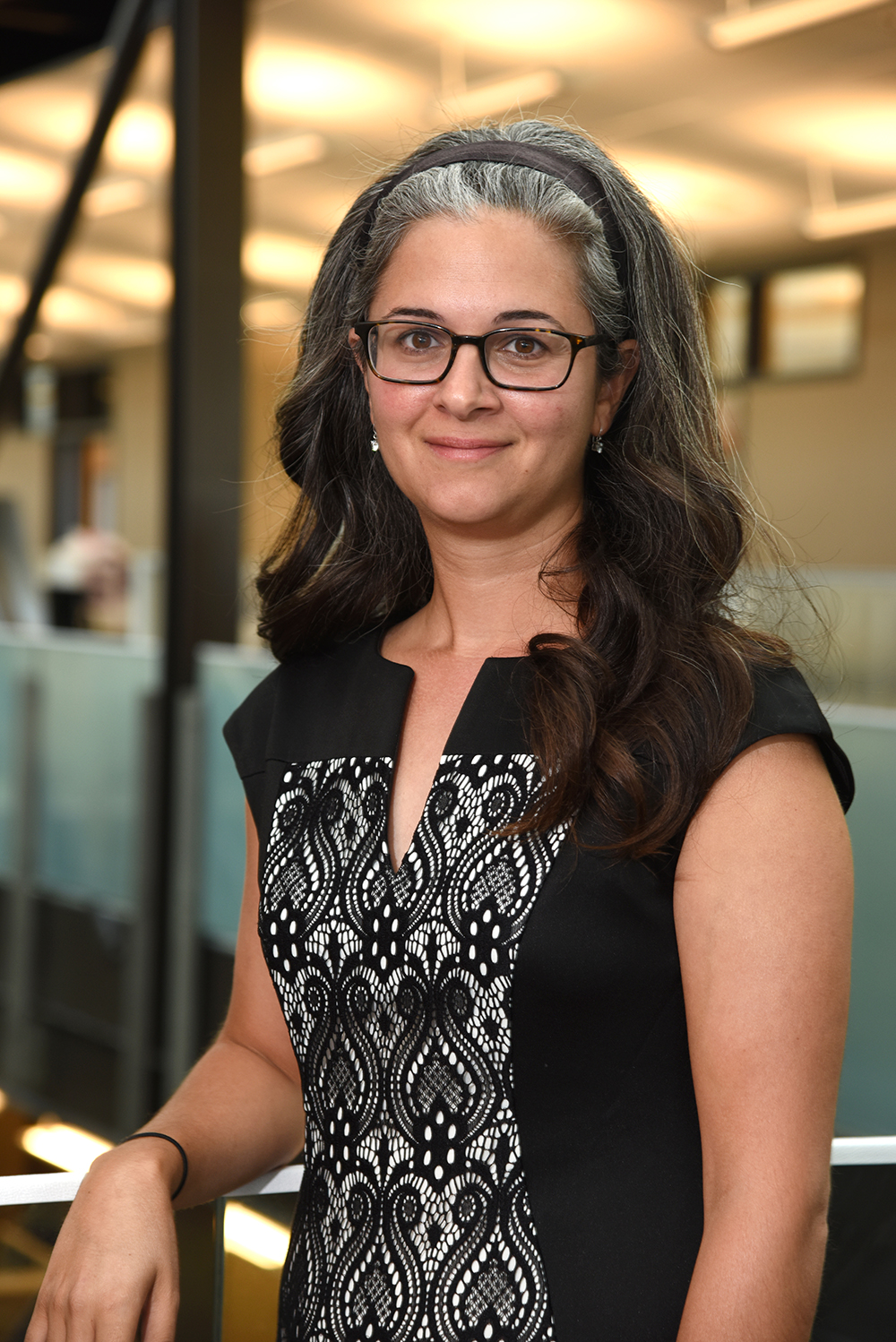
- Bakhtian in 2017
- Born: Noël Bakhtian
- Education: Duke University; Stanford University; University of Cambridge
- Scientific career
- Workplaces: United States Department of Energy; Idaho National Laboratory
- Thesis: Drag Augmentation via Supersonic Retropropulsion for Atmospheric Deceleration (2012)
- Website: adl.stanford.edu/people/NoelBakhtian.html

Noël Bakhtian is the former director of the Berkeley Lab Energy Storage Center at Lawrence Berkeley National Laboratory. She has served as the director of the Center for Advanced Energy Studies at Idaho National Laboratory and as a senior policy advisor for the White House Office of Science and Technology Policy.

== Early life and education ==
Bakhtian was inspired by Han Solo and The Wonderful Flight to the Mushroom Planet as a child. She attended the Canterbury School in Fort Myers, Florida. She completed her bachelor's degree at Duke University, where she was a Pratt research fellow. She graduated in 2005 with a degree in mechanical engineering and physics. She completed her master's degrees at Stanford University and the University of Cambridge, where she was a Churchill Scholar. At Cambridge she worked on unmanned aerial vehicles using a wind tunnel.

Bakhtian earned her doctorate at Stanford University in the department of Aeronautical and Astronautical engineering. She worked with Juan J. Alonso of Stanford and Michael J. Aftosmis Ames Research Center. Her thesis was in the field of supersonic retropropulsion, that is using thrusters to slow objects moving faster than the speed of sound. Bakhtian explored using such thrusters to change the shape of the leading bow shock so as to increase the decelerative drag force. Such technology may one enable landing objects of higher-mass on the surface of Mars, or other objects with a low-density atmosphere.

Whilst at Stanford University she attended a course on science policy and became interested in the intersection of government and academia. She was made a Phi Beta Kappa Elizabeth Buttler Reed Scholar. The Space Shuttle had shut down and there was discussion that NASA would not be involved with the International Space Station. She was awarded a Zonta International Amelia Earhart Fellowship in 2011 and spoke regularly on behalf of the NASA speakers bureau. She completed her thesis, Drag Augmentation via Supersonic Retropropulsion for Atmospheric Deceleration, in 2012. Whilst a graduate student she took part in Stanford Splash!, an education program for students in grades 8 - 12. She won a poster prize at the Society of Women Engineers Achievement Awards in 2011. Boeing named her the Engineering Student of the Year.

== Career and research ==
After completing her PhD, Bakhtian became an American Association for the Advancement of Science (AAAS) Science and Technology Policy fellow. She joined the United States Department of Energy and worked in the wind and water power office. She joined the office for international affairs, managing projects with China, Israel, Brazil, the UAE and the EU that involved water and energy policy. She developed nexus engagements including a US-China Commission Clean Energy Research Center and was technical lead of the $8M Wave Energy Prize. She developed the program and created an inter agency agreement with the United States Navy. Bakhtian became a trustee of the Summer Science Program, an education non-profit organisation, in 2011.

She was a senior policy advisor for the Office of Science and Technology Policy in the White House between 2015 and 2016. She served as Secretary for the Arctic Executive Steering Committee. She was celebrated as one of the General Services Administration's Unsung Heroes in 2015.

She was made head of the Centre for Advanced Energy Studies at Idaho National Laboratory in 2017. She is a member of the Idaho Global Entrepreneurial Mission council. She took part in the 2017 Women's March and is a member of the Women's Council on Energy and the Environment. She was described as one of the most powerful female engineers in the world by Business Insider in 2018. She serves on the advisory board of the Boise State University Energy Policy institute. Bakhtian was featured in the September 2018 Physics World.

Berkeley Lab Names Noël Bakhtian to Lead New Energy Storage Center in October 2020. The Department of Energy’s Lawrence Berkeley National Laboratory (Berkeley Lab) has appointed Noël Bakhtian, previously a senior policy adviser in the White House Office of Science and Technology (OSTP) and currently director of the Center for Advanced Energy Studies (CAES) at Idaho National Laboratory, as its inaugural director of the Berkeley Lab Energy Storage Center.
