= Monroe W. Hatch Jr. =

United States Air Force general

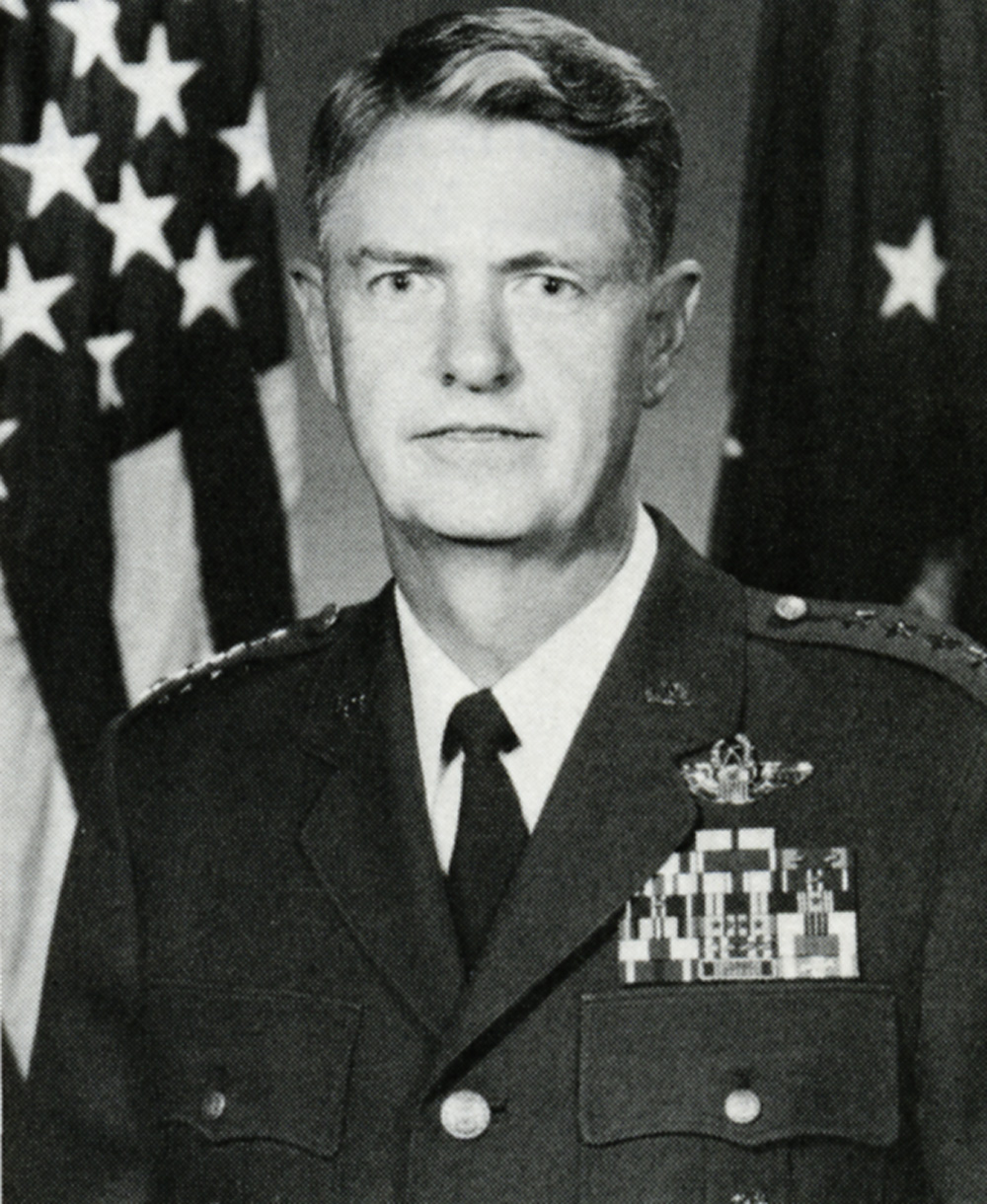
- General Monroe W. Hatch Jr.
- Born: 20 November 1933 (age 92); New Orleans, Louisiana, U.S.
- Military career
- Allegiance: United States
- Branch: United States Air Force
- Service years: 1951–1990
- Rank: General
- Commands: 14th Air Division; Vice Commander-in-Chief, Strategic Air Command; Vice Chief of Staff of the United States Air Force
- Conflicts: Cold War; Korean War; Vietnam War

Monroe W. Hatch Jr. (born 20 November 1933) is a retired four-star general in the United States Air Force (USAF) and the former Vice Chief of Staff of the United States Air Force.

== Biography ==
=== Early life ===
Hatch was born in 1933, in New Orleans, Louisiana. He entered the United States Naval Academy in 1951 and graduated in 1955 with a bachelor of science degree.

Upon graduation, Hatch was commissioned as a second lieutenant in the USAF and assigned to the 3415th Technical Training Wing, Lowry Air Force Base, Colorado, for guidance officer training. In February 1956, he transferred to the 587th Tactical Missile Group at Sembach Air Base, West Germany, as a squadron guided missile officer. In February 1958, he entered pilot training at Graham Air Force Base, Florida, and continued training at Greenville Air Force Base, Mississippi, where he received his wings in January 1959. After B-47 Stratojet combat crew training, he was assigned to the 321st Bombardment Wing, McCoy Air Force Base, Florida. In July 1961, he transitioned to B-52 Stratofortresses and served as a pilot with the 42nd Bombardment Wing, Loring Air Force Base, Maine.

He was assigned as a special projects officer and, later, programs officer in the Advanced Technical Division, Headquarters Strategic Air Command (SAC), Offutt Air Force Base, Nebraska, from July 1964 to April 1965. He then served as an operations staff officer in the Astronautics Technology and Applications Office, under the deputy chief of staff for plans. In June 1967, he attended the University of Oklahoma under the Air Force Institute of Technology program. While there he was elected to Tau Beta Pi and Sigma Gamma Tau honor societies.

He was assigned to Headquarters 7th Air Force, Tan Son Nhut Air Base, Republic of Vietnam, in June 1969, serving as a T-39 Sabreliner courier pilot and as 7th Air Force standardization and evaluation flight examiner.

In October 1970, Hatch was assigned to the Office of the Secretary of Defense, Washington D.C., where he served as military assistant for strategic analysis in the Office of the Deputy Director for Strategic and Space Systems, Under Secretary of Defense for Research and Engineering. He then attended the National War College from August 1973 until July 1974. After graduating, Hatch was assigned to the Aircraft Division, Directorate of Operational Requirements and Development, Headquarters USAF, Washington D.C. After serving as deputy division chief, he became chief of the division in June 1976. In September 1978, he was assigned as deputy director for strategic forces, Office of the Deputy Chief of Staff for Research, Development and Acquisition.

He returned to SAC headquarters in June 1979, as assistant deputy chief of staff of plans for operational requirements. In March 1981, he became commander of 14th Air Division, Beale Air Force Base, California. He was assigned to SAC headquarters in February 1982 and served as deputy chief of staff for plans until February 1983, when he became the command's chief of staff. Hatch was appointed Inspector General of the Air Force in September 1984. In August 1985, he was assigned as vice commander in chief, Strategic Air Command, Offutt Air Force Base. He assumed his final duty as Vice Chief of Staff of the United States Air Force in February 1987. He retired on 1 June 1990.

After retirement, he became the executive director of the Air Force Association. He has also worked in the private sector.

== Awards ==
Awards earned during his career:

- Defense Distinguished Service Medal
- Air Force Distinguished Service Medal
- Legion of Merit with an oak leaf cluster
- Air Medal with two oak leaf clusters
- Joint Service Commendation Medal
- Air Force Commendation Medal
- Air Force Outstanding Unit Award with an oak leaf cluster
- Air Force Organizational Excellence Award with an oak leaf cluster
- Combat Readiness Medal
- National Defense Service Medal with a service star
- Armed Forces Expeditionary Medal
- Vietnam Service Medal with four service stars
- Air Force Overseas Ribbon-Short
- Air Force Overseas Ribbon-Long
- Air Force Longevity Service Award Ribbon with eight oak leaf clusters
- Small Arms Expert Marksmanship Ribbon
- Air Force Training Ribbon
- Republic of Vietnam Gallantry Cross with Palm
- Republic of Vietnam Campaign Medal
- Command pilot with more than 6,000 flying hours
