= Alfred J. Eggers =

Alfred J. Eggers, Jr.
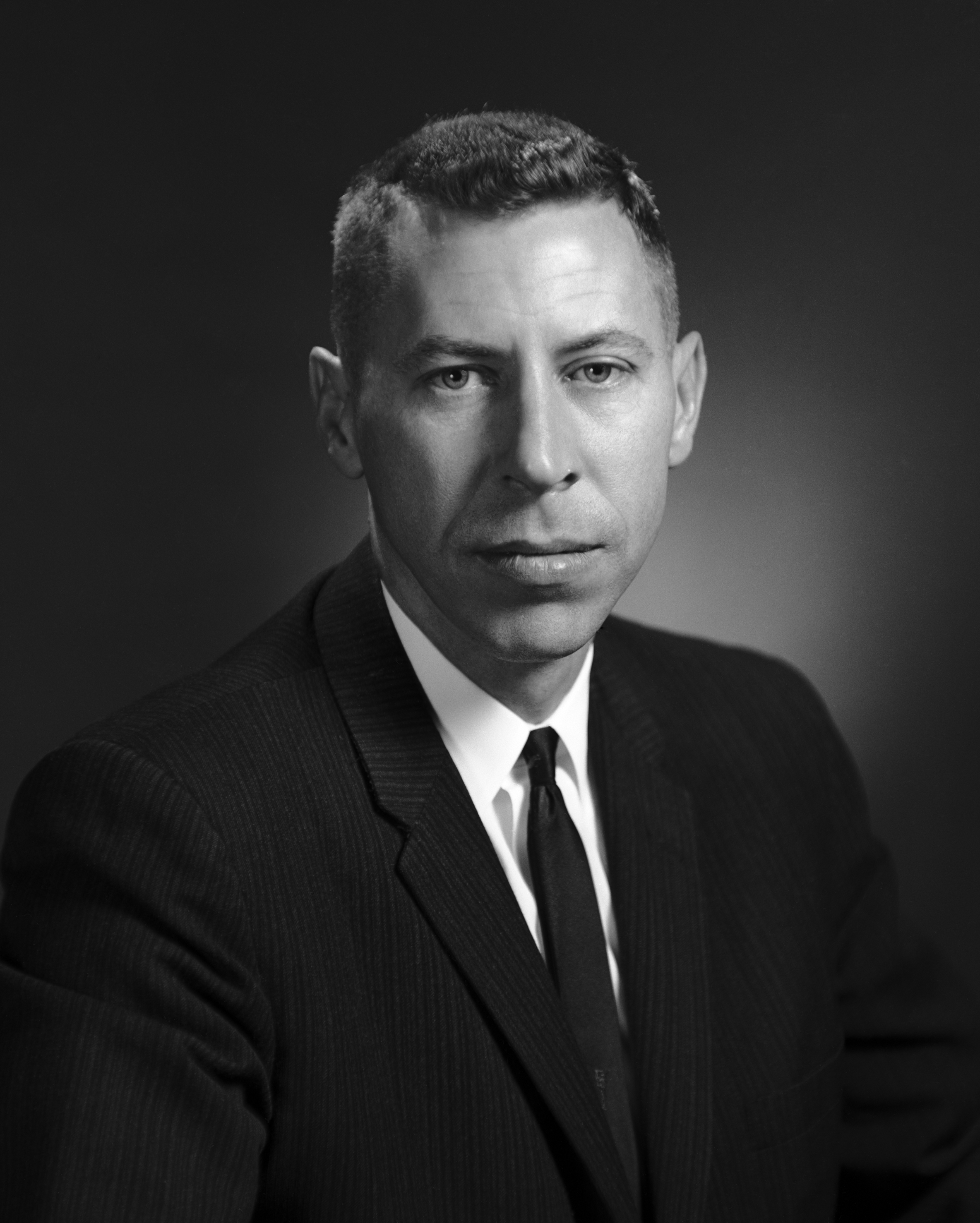
- Eggers in 1962
- Born: June 24, 1922; Omaha, Nebraska, U.S.
- Died: September 22, 2006 (aged 84); Atherton, California, U.S.
- Education: University of Omaha, Stanford University
- Known for: supersonic flight, re-entry physics
- Scientific career
- Fields: Aerospace Engineer
- Workplaces: NACA, NASA

Alfred J. Eggers, Jr. (June 24, 1922 – September 22, 2006) was NASA's Assistant Administrator for Policy. He devoted efforts to determine the influence of aviation technology in world peace and lectured widely.

Eggers specialized in hypersonic and spaceflight research including the development of new wind tunnel and ballistic range facilities. He went to work for the NACA at Ames Aeronautical Laboratory in 1944 after completing the V-12 Navy College Training Program.

== Biography ==
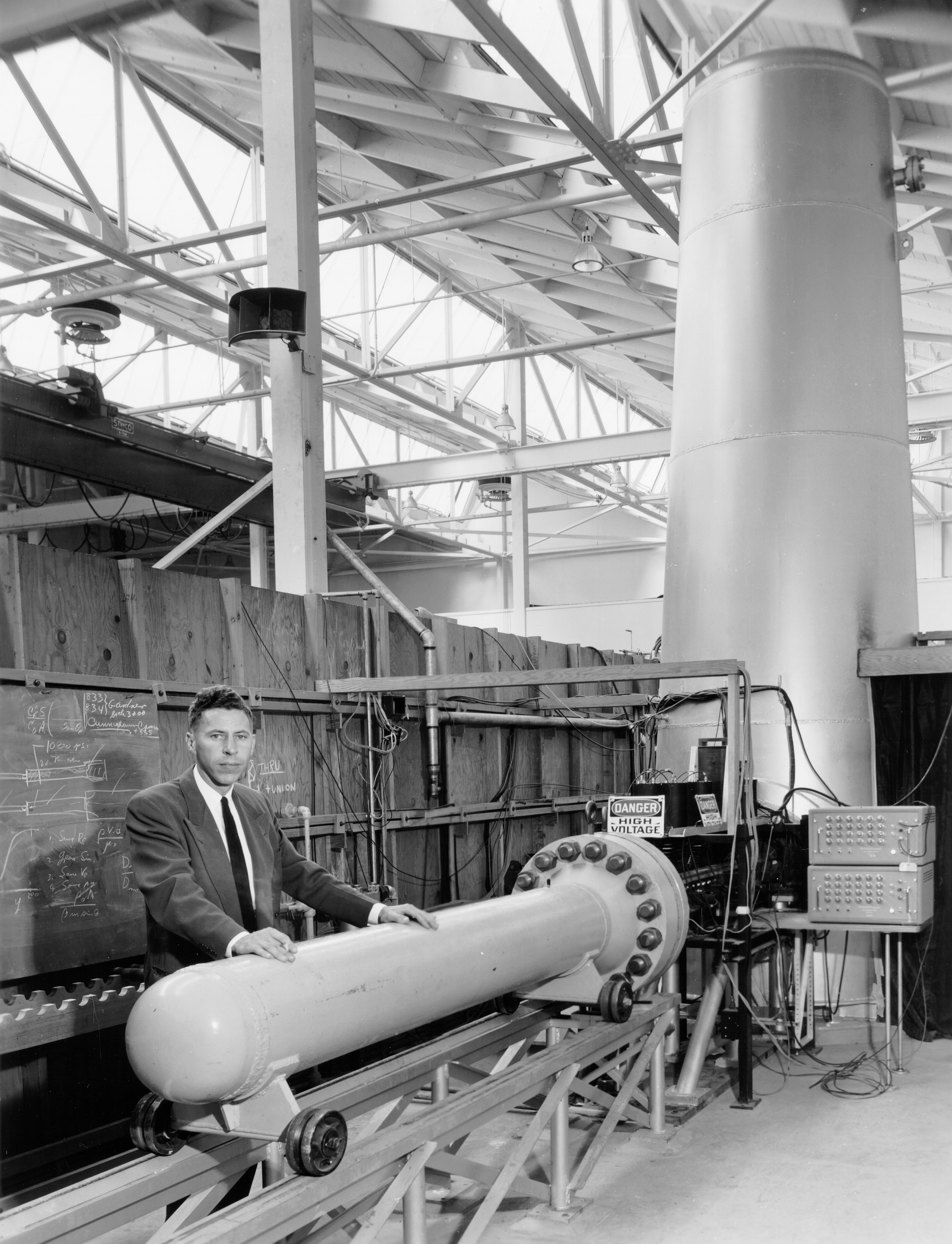
Al Eggers at NACA Ames facility in 1956.

In 1954, he became Division Chief of the Vehicle Environment Division, which was composed of a physics branch, an entry simulation branch, a structural dynamics branch, the 3.5 foot hypersonic wind tunnel branch and the hypervelocity ballistic range branch. In 1958, Eggers headed up the Manned Satellite Team, which was to design a practical system for a satellite while recommending a suitable research program. This ultimately led to Ames developing and managing the Pioneer program of planetary exploration probes. Although Eggers is most famous for his pioneering work on atmospheric reentry with a blunt body, arguably his greatest achievement was his work on supersonic interference lift. This work lead directly to the XB-70 Valkyrie supersonic bomber.

In May 1964, Eggers was appointed Deputy Associate Administrator for Advanced Research and Technology. He became Assistant Administrator for Policy in January 1968, and served until March 1971. From 1969 to 1970, Eggers was a visiting professor at the Massachusetts Institute of Technology.

Following his career at NASA, Eggers took a position as Assistant Director for Research Applications at the National Science Foundation.

His assistant, C. A. "Sy" Syvertson became Director of NASA Ames Research Center. A friend of both was the aerodynamicist, R. T. Jones.
