= Zed Factor Fellowship =

- Founded: 2020
- Founders: Tanya Harrison; Therese Jones; Carie Lemack; Karina Perez
- Purpose: Aerospace Engineering
- Location: Washington D.C.
- Region served: United States
- Website: zedfactorfellowship.org

The Zed Factor Fellowship is a non-profit program in the United States that provides paid internships and executive mentorship to underrepresented undergraduate and graduate students seeking careers in aerospace. The fellowship was founded in 2020 and is closely modeled on programs such as the Brooke Owens Fellowship.

== History ==
The Zed Factor Fellowship Program was founded in 2020 by Tanya Harrison, planetary scientist at NASA JPL and Planet Labs, Carie Lemack, CEO of DreamUp, and Karina Perez, Director for Unmanned and Emerging Aviation Technologies at the Aerospace Industries Association. The fellowship program was awarded "Most Intriguing Newcomer" to the commercial spaceflight industry by Forbes in 2020.

The program provides students paid summer internships at space companies including Relativity Space, Planet Labs, and The Planetary Society, zero-g flight opportunities, and mentorship from aerospace leaders including CEOs, directors, and test pilots. Fellows are invited to the annual Future Space Leaders summit in Washington D.C. to network and meet industry officials. Fellows also engage in a community service project of their design with support from the program.

As of 2023, the fellowship program is partnered with the Brooke Owens Fellowship and the Future Space Leaders Foundation.

== Alumni ==
As of 2023, the Zed Factor Fellowship has 60 alumni across three cohorts associated with more than 40 different national universities.

In 2023, nearly 250 students from 115 universities around the United States applied. Approximately 20 are selected annually.
