= Gamma Alpha Rho =

American collegiate honor society

- ΓΑΡ
- Founded: October 21, 1945; 81 years ago Rensselaer Polytechnic Institute
- Type: Honor
- Affiliation: Independent
- Status: Merged
- Merge date: February 28, 1953
- Successor: Sigma Gamma Tau
- Emphasis: Aeronautical engineering
- Scope: National (US)
- Chapters: 7
- Members: 1,000+ lifetime
- Headquarters: Troy, New York; United States

Gamma Alpha Rho (ΓΑΡ) was an American aeronautical engineering student honor society. It was created at the Rensselaer Polytechnic Institute in Troy, New York in 1945. It merged with Tau Omega, an aeronautical professional fraternity, to create the aeronautical honor society Sigma Gamma Tau in 1953.

== History ==
Gamma Alpha Rho was established at the Rensselaer Polytechnic Institute in Troy, New York in 1945. Its first official meeting was held on October 21, 1945. Its founders were faculty member H. Burlage Jr. and H. L. Flomenhoft, a student of aeronautical engineering. Its founding members were Flomenhoft, Clarence Cohen, and Steve Maslem.

Gamma Alpha Rho was a social and scientific honor society, created to recognize academic, achievements, and integrity in the field of aeronautical engineering. Its founders also hoped to improve professional ethics and to create a connection between students and faculty. Its first pledge class was initiated in late 1945. Dr. John R. Weske was its first academic advisor.

In the spring of 1946, Gamma Alpha Rho's members discussed becoming a national organization. A new constitution was adopted in the fall of 1946, allowing the local group to expand. Beta chapter was chartered at Virginia Tech in 1947, followed by Gamma chapter at Purdue University. In 1948, the group officially became a "national honorary aeronautical engineering society". Membership was open to juniors and seniors studying aeronautical engineering. In June 1949, Gamma Alpha Rho initiated its first female member, Edna Van Note.

The society expanded to include seven chapters and more than 1,000 members in 1952. It merged with the professional fraternity Tau Omega to form Sigma Gamma Tau on February 28, 1953.

== Symbols ==
The Greek letters Gamma, Alpha, and Rho were selected for the society's name because those letters are commonly used in the field of aeronautical engineering. The Gamma Alpha Rho key was shaped like a Joukowsky airfoil over a circle.

== Chapters ==
Following is a list of Gamma Alpha Rho chapters.

Chapter	Charter date and range	Institution	Location	Status	Ref.
Alpha	October 21, 1945 – February 28, 1953	Rensselaer Polytechnic Institute	Troy, New York	Merged (ΣΓΤ)	(Note: This became a chapter of Sigma Gamma Tau after the national merger of the two fraternities.)
Beta	May 1947 – February 28, 1953	Virginia Tech	Blacksburg, Virginia	Merged (ΣΓΤ)	
Gamma	1947 – February 28, 1953	Purdue University	West Lafayette, Indiana	Merged (ΣΓΤ)	
Delta	1948 – February 28, 1953	University of Illinois	Urbana, Illinois	Merged (ΣΓΤ)	
Epsilon	1948 – February 28, 1953	University of Alabama	Tuscaloosa, Alabama	Merged (ΣΓΤ)	
Zeta	1949 – February 28, 1953	Iowa State University	Ames, Iowa	Merged (ΣΓΤ)	(Note: With the national merger of the two fraternities, this chapter merged with the Eta chapter of Tau Omega to form a chapter of Sigma Gamma Tau.)
Eta	1949 – February 28, 1953	Massachusetts Institute of Technology	Cambridge, Massachusetts	Merged (ΣΓΤ)	

== Notable members ==
- Jay R. Brill, United States Air Force Brigadier and deputy for the A-10, Aeronautical Systems Division, Air Force Systems Command at Wright-Patterson Air Force Base
- Herbert A. Lyon, United States Air Force Major General in charge of the Space and Missile Test Center at Vandenberg Air Force Base
- Igor Sikorsky (Alpha, 1947), aviation pioneer
