= NASA Academy =

Leadership development training program at NASA

- NASA Academy Logo
- Type: Private
- Established: 1993
- Campus: Campuses at various NASA centers

The NASA Academy is NASA's premiere leadership training program for undergraduate and graduate students. Since its founding in 1993, the NASA Academy has brought together future leaders of the aerospace industry and exposed them to the inner workings of NASA, academia, and industry. The Academy consists of a ten-week summer program hosted by a participating NASA center. Currently there are academies at Langley Research Center, Ames Research Center, Marshall Space Flight Center and Glenn Research Center. Goddard Space Flight Center and Dryden Flight Research Center previously hosted NASA Academies, as well.

== History ==
The NASA Academy was founded in 1993 at NASA's Goddard Space Flight Center by Gerald "Gerry" Soffen. The concept was largely based on the concept of the International Space University. Soffen envisioned the NASA Academy as a leadership program with an inter-disciplinary approach similar to ISU, but without the emphasis on the international and intercultural aspects. Specifically, Soffen created the program to "give possible 'leaders' a view into how NASA, the university community, and the private sector function; [to] set their priorities; and [to] contribute to the success of the aerospace program."

The research focus for any specific NASA Academy can change from year to year. In 2015, the Multidisciplinary Aeronautics Research Team Initiative (MARTI) replaced the Aeronautics Academy.

== Mission statement ==
NASA Academy is a unique summer experience of higher learning whose goal is to help guide the future leaders of the American Space Program by giving them a glimpse of how the whole system works.

— Gerald Soffen, NASA Academy Founder (1926–2000)

The NASA Academy states its mission as follows: "to identify and recruit the future leaders of the space exploration community, to introduce them to the key aspects of the industry, to provide them with critical training, and to build an ever-expanding network of these future leaders, so that these young scientists and engineers are prepared to assume the highest responsibilities of a career dedicated to leadership in space exploration."

== Program Overview ==
The 2010 NASA Academy Definitions Document outlines six key criteria that are critical to the program and which, when taken as a whole, differentiate it from other NASA leadership development programs:

1. Principal Investigator-Directed Research, wherein the Research Associate devotes an average of 30 hours a week to a research project within a NASA science or advanced technology program.
2. A Group Research Project requiring the collaborative efforts of all of the Research Associates as well as external advisors. Traditionally, this requires extensive work during evenings and weekends, and consumes several working days during normal business hours towards to end of the program.
3. Structured and Unstructured Team Building activities, designed to form an effective and cohesive community from an interdisciplinary group of leaders.
4. Interactions with current aerospace industry leaders, including both formal lectures and informal opportunities to interact at meals, launches, and other events.
5. Site visits to a variety of NASA centers, companies, and university labs. Traditionally, this takes up approximately one working day during normal business hours as well as extensive work during evenings and weekends.
6. A culture of extreme professionalism and preparation.

NASA Academy students are typically expected to work long hours: as a general rule, the day is scheduled from 07:30 to 21:00, after which students work on the Team Project or on individual research assignments. However, NASA Academy students are also typically given excellent opportunities, including field trips to other centers and excellent access to the leaders and decision-makers of the aerospace industry.

A NASA Academy class typically varies from 10-20 students per center per year. Participants are selected in a joint effort between the NASA Center, the NASA Academy Alumni Association, the PIs, and the State Space Grant Consortia. Alumni from the previous year's program are typically selected to serve as program coordinators for current sessions. For several years in the early 2000s (decade), the NASA Academy at GSFC admitted a French student every year as part of a cooperative agreement with the Centre National d'Études Spatiales, the French space agency.

== Notable alumni ==
After 14 years, among its alumni are over 50 members with doctorates, 45 employees of NASA centers, 65 NASA contractors, 70 other professionals in aerospace-related fields, 10 math, science and physics teachers, and three CEOs, with approximately 50% of the alumni currently having completed or completing advanced degrees. In addition, Academy alumni account for hundreds of scholarship awards, space agency awards, national awards, professional society awards, and university awards, including five NASA Harriett G. Jenkins Pre-Doctoral Fellows during the past five years -- with at least one in every cohort. Academy alumni are also responsible for hundreds of presentations, projects, publications and patents.

— NASA, 2007
- Christina Hammock Koch, NASA Astronaut and the first woman to travel beyond low Earth orbit and journey around the Moon
- Josh Cassada, NASA Astronaut Expedition 68
- Holly Ridings, NASA's Chief Flight Director—the first woman ever to hold that role.
- Eric C. Anderson, Chairman of Space Adventures, President and CEO of the Intentional Software Corporation, Chairman of the Commercial Spaceflight Federation, and Co-Founder and Co-Chairman of Planetary Resources
- Emily Calandrelli, astronaut, author, and host and producer of the Emmy-nominated educational television program Xploration Station.
- Diana Trujillo, NASA Flight Director who previously helped lead the Mars Curiosity and Mars 2020 rover projects.
- Enectalí Figueroa-Feliciano, pioneer of positron-sensitive detectors, MIT Professor
- Bethany Ehlmann, Director of the Laboratory for Atmospheric and Space Physics at the University of Colorado Boulder.
- Chris Lewicki, Founder of Planetary Resources, formerly Mars Exploration Rover Flight Director, and the first person to drive the MER rovers on Mars
- Jared Henderson, the Democratic Party's nominee for the Governor of Arkansas during the 2018 election.
- Jake Lopata, Founder and President of rocket launch startup company SpaceLaunch, Inc.
- Laura Stiles, Blue Origin engineer and astronaut on Blue Origin NS-38
