= Aidchild =

Non-profit organization operating in Uganda

Aidchild, a not-for-profit organization incorporated in both Uganda and the United States, was established in 2000 as a hospice center for children living with AIDS whose family or extended family members could not care for them. In 2002, it became the first pediatric facility in Uganda to provide free anti-retroviral drugs to children. As of 2009, founder Nathaniel Dunigan reported that more than 3,000 children had received care and treatment through Aidchild's inpatient and outpatient services, including a laboratory, two clinics, homes, and academies in Masaka and Mpigi, Uganda. By 2011, according to tax filings, it had increased the number of children who lived in the facilities to 96.

Aidchild is supported by a mix of government and private donors and income-generating activities.

== History ==
Aidchild was founded by US American citizen Nathaniel Dunigan. According to Dunigan, he first visited Uganda when he was Deputy Director of the Office of the Governor in Tucson, Arizona. (There is some question about this assertion, since the first visit was in 1998, a year after the resignation of Fife Symington, III, the governor under whom Dunigan was reported to work as a "Tucson representative for the Fife Symington administration.") During a one-month trip variously reported as at the behest of the Governor's Office on AIDS and "a nondenominational religious organization from northern Arizona," Dunigan volunteered as an HIV-prevention educator in Uganda, where he met many children who were suffering and dying. On his return to the US, he resolved to make a difference. At the age of 26, he resigned from his job and sold his car and belongings, which garnered him the startup budget of $3,500 for the Aidchild foundation. Then he moved to Uganda. Two years later, USAID, which had already provided financial assistance, responded positively to Dunigan's application for a $750,000 grant to help Aidchild establish a second location and create enterprises to help fund the work. In its June 2003 annual report, AIM, a project of USAID and the CDC, acknowledged that "the grant... [fell] outside the normal parameters for AIM support" because AIM was hoping to "learn from AIDchild's approaches and programs" and "look for innovative ways to share lessons learned with other organizations" as well as working with the organization "to strengthen their linkages to the community so that children from the AIDchild [sic] program will one day be integrated into regular community structures and life." The second center at Mpigi was created just after that, along with a treatment facility and the Aidchild Equation Café that would help to fund the organization's services.

=== Social entrepreneurship ===
Aidchild operates the Equation Gallery, an art gallery and café on the Equator line in Uganda; Ten Tables, a restaurant and screening room in Masaka, and Aidchild's Terrace Club, a rooftop barbecue venue and boutique hostel. According to Dunigan, international travel guides have called the businesses the very best in Eastern and Central Africa, including a citation by Lonely Planet, which rated the Equation Café "first class." Another travel site reports that after her visit, actor Emma Thompson wrote in the guest book that the Gallery was "possibly the best shop on the planet." Also according to Dunigan, the Eye Magazine, a Ugandan travel magazine, named the Ten Tables restaurant the best in the nation in 2008.

The organization earns up to 50% of its operating budget from these businesses.

== Nathaniel Dunigan ==
Work in the United States

Before he started Aidchild in 2000, according to his own reports, Dunigan had had no previous experience in AIDS/HIV education, prevention, or treatment, outside his one-month volunteer gig, nor fostering or residential care of children. Nonetheless, he was called in April 2002 to testify before the United States Congress in Washington, DC about his experience caring for children living with AIDS and other vulnerable children in Africa. In 2004, Dunigan was nominated for the World of Children Award.

After living in Uganda for nine years, Dunigan returned to the US to complete a 2009 master's degree in education at the Harvard Graduate School of Education, specializing in Human Development and Psychology, and a 2014 PhD in Leadership and Education at the University of San Diego’s School of Leadership and Education Sciences (SOLES) where he was the Dammeyer Fellow. He was also a Reynolds Fellow in Social Entrepreneurship at the Harvard Kennedy School's Center for Public Leadership. In 2014, he self-published the book, We Are Not Mahogany: Three stories about the male African life.

Current work

In 2017, Dunigan began to transform Aidchild from a residential care and HIV treatment center into a leadership educational organization now called Aidchild Leadership Institute (ALI). Dunigan divides his time between Uganda and Florida in his role as Chief Executive Officer of ALI.

== Controversy ==
Allegations of neglect and abuse have been made against Aidchild, its founder, and other members of its leadership. According to investigative reporting by The World, adults who lived at Aidchild homes as children recount how they began to experience neglect when Dunigan returned to the States in 2009. One government official reported that a 2009 inspection revealed that this treatment facility housing sick children was unsanitary and lacked on-site medical personnel. By 2013, neglect had allegedly escalated, with children being inadequately nourished and psychologically and physically abused. By 2017, Dunigan himself is alleged to have subjected children to physical, sexual, and emotional abuse. Former staff members corroborate the alleged abuse survivors’ reports. In addition to issues of neglect and abuse, there appears to also be a problem of licensing. A government official, head of the Alternative Care Unit in the Ministry of Gender, Labor, and Social Development that oversees all residential homes for minors, claims that Aidchild and ALI have not been "legally approved to be caring for children on a permanent basis" and that all residential facilities for children in Uganda are meant to be transitional only. The official also asserts that neglect of children is a criminal offense under Ugandan law. Dunigan and his staff deny all reports of abuse and continue to assert their legitimacy as a care facility, although with the establishment of ALI, the organization is said to be transitioning away from residential care.
