= Sigma Gamma Tau =

American aerospace engineering honor society

- ΣΓΤ
- Founded: February 28, 1953; 73 years ago Purdue University
- Type: Honor
- Affiliation: Independent
- Former affiliation: ACHS
- Status: Active
- Emphasis: Aerospace Engineering
- Scope: National
- Colors: Red and White
- Chapters: 40 active
- Members: 30,000+ lifetime
- Headquarters: Sigma Gamma Tau, c/o Department of Aerospace Engineering, Wichita State University; Wichita, Kansas 67260-0042; United States
- Website: www.sgtnational.org

Sigma Gamma Tau (ΣΓΤ) is the American honor society in aerospace engineering. The society formed from the merger of Tau Omega and Gamma Alpha Rho in 1953. It has chartered more than fifty chapters in the United States.

== History ==
Sigma Gamma Tau was founded on the campus of Purdue University in West Lafayette, Indiana, on February 28, 1953. The new society was formed by the merger of two existing aeronautical honor societies, Tau Omega, and Gamma Alpha Rho. Tau Omega was established in 1927 at the University of Oklahoma. Gamma Alpha Rho was founded in 1945 at Rensselaer Polytechnic Institute.

Sigma Gamma Tau was created to recognize academic and professional achievement in aeronautical engineering and to foster ethics and professional practices within the field. With the merger of the two societies, it started with fourteen chapters, representing 1,900 initiates. The society was incorporated in Oklahoma. It held its first national convention in 1953 at Purdue University. Conventions are held every three years, often in conjunction with the American Institute of Aeronautics and Astronautics's Science and Technology Forum. Officers are elected at the convention, including the national president, national first vice-president, national second vice-president, and the national secretary-treasurer.

Gamma Sigma Tau joined the Association of College Honor Societies on February 27, 1965 but has since left that organization. By June 1966, it had nineteen chapters with 2,300 members. In 1991, it had chartered 46 chapters with 12,000 members.

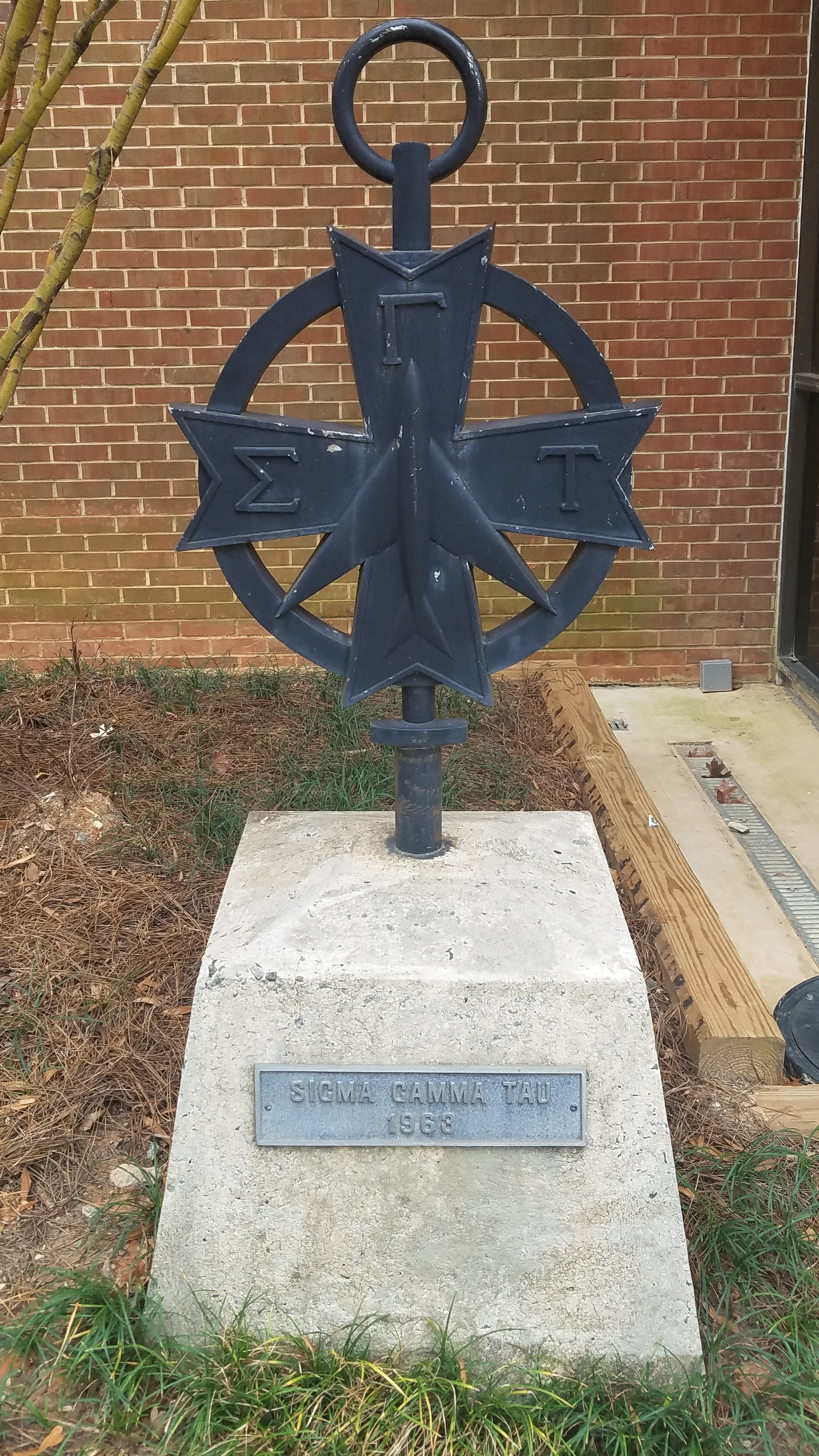
Sigma Gamma Tau marker at Georgia Tech

Gamma Sigma Tau has chartered 54 collegiate chapters and has initiated more than 30,000 members. Its activities include a mentorship program, test reviews, tutoring, and social events.

Sigma Gamma Tau's national headquarters is located at the Aerospace Engineering Department of Wichita State University.

== Symbols ==
The name of Sigma Gamma Tau was selected by combining the Greek letter Sigma, indicating sum, with Gamma to and Tau from the initial letters of the predecessor organizations, Gamma Alpha Rho and Tau Omega.

The society's insignia is a key with the Greek letters ΣΓΤ. Its colors are red and white. Its publications are Contact and Mach.

== Membership ==
Sigma Gamma Tau's collegiate chapters elect annually to membership those students, alumni, and professionals who, by conscientious attention to their studies or professional duties, uphold this high standard for the betterment of their profession.

== Chapters ==
Sigma Gamma Tau has chartered 54 chapters and has 40 active chapters as of 2024.

== Notable members ==
- Robert J. Cenker, astronaut and engineer
- Roger B. Chaffee, astronaut and pilot
- Julie Wertz Chen, aerospace engineer
- Robert Crippen, astronaut
- Brian Gyetko, professional tennis player
- Fred Haise, astronaut
- Gregory J. Harbaugh, astronaut and engineer
- Monroe W. Hatch Jr., United States Air Force general
- Edgar Mitchell, astronaut and lunar explorer
- Steven R. Nagel, test pilot, astronaut, and engineer
- David Scott, astronaut and lunar explorer
- Diana Trujillo, aerospace engineer

== See also ==
- Honor society
- Professional fraternities and sororities
