= Tau Omega =

American professional college fraternity

- ΤΩ
- Founded: December 1927; 98 years ago University of Oklahoma
- Type: Professional
- Affiliation: Independent
- Status: Merged
- Successor: Sigma Gamma Tau
- Emphasis: Aeronautical engineering
- Scope: National
- Motto: Quid Pro Quo
- Member badge
- Publication: The Contact
- Chapters: 9
- Members: 1,000+ lifetime
- Headquarters: Norman, Oklahoma; United States

Tau Omega (ΤΩ) was an American professional fraternity for aeronautical engineering. It was established at the University of Oklahoma in Norman, Oklahoma in 1927. Tau Omega was the first professional fraternity for aviation. In 1953, it merged with Gamma Alpha Rho to form Sigma Gamma Tau, a national aeronautical engineering society.

== History ==
Tau Omega was established as a professional fraternity in December 1927 by students who were interested in flying instruction at the University of Oklahoma. Its founders were Warren E. Daniel, Orville Gulker, James E. "Jimmie" Haizlip, J. Court Hayes, and Earl O. Weining.

Tau Omega was the first professional fraternity for aeronautics. Haizlip was its first president. Its purpose was promoting an interest in aviation amongst college men. Membership was open to students studying aviation.

By January 1928, students at three other universities had petitioned to form a chapter of Tau Omega. In February 1928, the fraternity was chartered as a "National Honorary Aeronautical Engineering Fraternity". In 1932, Beta chapter was established at the University of Wichita.

The fraternity expanded to include nine chapters and more than 1,000 alumni. On February 28, 1953, it merged with Gamma Alpha Rho, a similar organization, to form Sigma Gamma Tau.

== Symbols and traditions ==
The fraternity's insignia was a key shaped like a Maltese cross, with a superimposed airplane engine and propeller. On the horizontal arms of the cross were the Greek letters Τ and Ω. One the vertical arms of the cross were a covered wagon and lamp of learning on the cross, symbolizing the pioneering spirit and knowledge required for the field of aeronautics.

Tau Omega's motto was Quid Pro Quo. Its magazine was The Contact.

Its pledges were required to wear goggles and a white flying helmet the day before being initiated as members. Its initiation traditions included a daybreak airplane ride.

== Activities ==
As early in as 1927, Tau Omega started the first flying school in Norman, Oklahoma; the school was not connected to the University of Oklahoma which started its own flying school in 1940.

Tau Omega members built and tested airplanes. In March 1928, members of the Alpha chapter rebuilt an airplane that belonged to the Oklahoma Air Transport Company. In December 1929, the fraternity began constructing a glider with hopes of setting a new endurance record. The glider was featured at an aerial display at the University of Oklahoma in March 1930. In April 1931, the fraternity began designing and building a monoplane to be completed in December.

In October 1931, the fraternity built a wind tunnel to be used by University of Oklahoma students for testing miniature airplane models. Members also studied engines, including a Curtis D-12 airplane engine that was loaned to the fraternity by the United States Navy in May 1933.

== Chapters ==
Following are the chapters of Tau Omega.

| Chapter | Charter date and range | Institution | Location | Status | Ref. |
|---|---|---|---|---|---|
| Alpha | December 1927 – February 28, 1953 | University of Oklahoma | Norman, Oklahoma | Merged (ΣΓΤ) | (Note: With the national merger with Gamma Alpha Rho, this became a chapter of Sigma Gamma Tau.) |
| Beta | 1932 – February 28, 1953 | University of Wichita | Wichita, Kansas | Merged (ΣΓΤ) | |
| Gamma | 1935 – February 28, 1953 | University of Kansas | Lawrence, Kansas | Merged (ΣΓΤ) | |
| Delta | April 12, 1943 – 194x ? | Illinois Institute of Technology | Chicago, Illinois | Inactive | (Note: Chapter did not reopen after World War II.) |
| Epsilon | April 25, 1943 – 1944; October 16, 1945 – February 28, 1953 | University of Minnesota | Minneapolis, Minnesota | Merged (ΣΓΤ) | (Note: Chapter went inactive during World War II.) |
| Zeta | 1943–before February 1953 | University of Pittsburgh | Pittsburgh, Pennsylvania | Withdrew | (Note: Chapter went inactive before the February 1953 merger convention.) |
| Eta | 1949 – February 28, 1953 | Iowa State University | Ames, Iowa | Merged (ΣΓΤ) | (Note: With the national merger of the two fraternities, this chapter merged with the Zeta chapter of Gamma Alpha Rho to form a chapter of Sigma Gamma Tau.) |
| Theta | May 18, 1952 – February 28, 1953 | Georgia Tech | Atlanta, Georgia | Merged (ΣΓΤ) | |
| Iota ? | 1952? – February 28, 1953 | Carnegie Institute of Technology | Pittsburgh, Pennsylvania | Merged (ΣΓΤ) | |

== Notable members ==
- Bennett Griffin, aviator
- Herbert A. Lyon, United States Air Force Major General in charge of the Space and Missile Test Center at Vandenberg Air Force Base
- Clarence Syvertson, director of the Ames Research Center of the National Aeronautics and Space Administration
- John Young, astronaut and lunar explorer
