= Tanya Harrison =

Planetary scientist

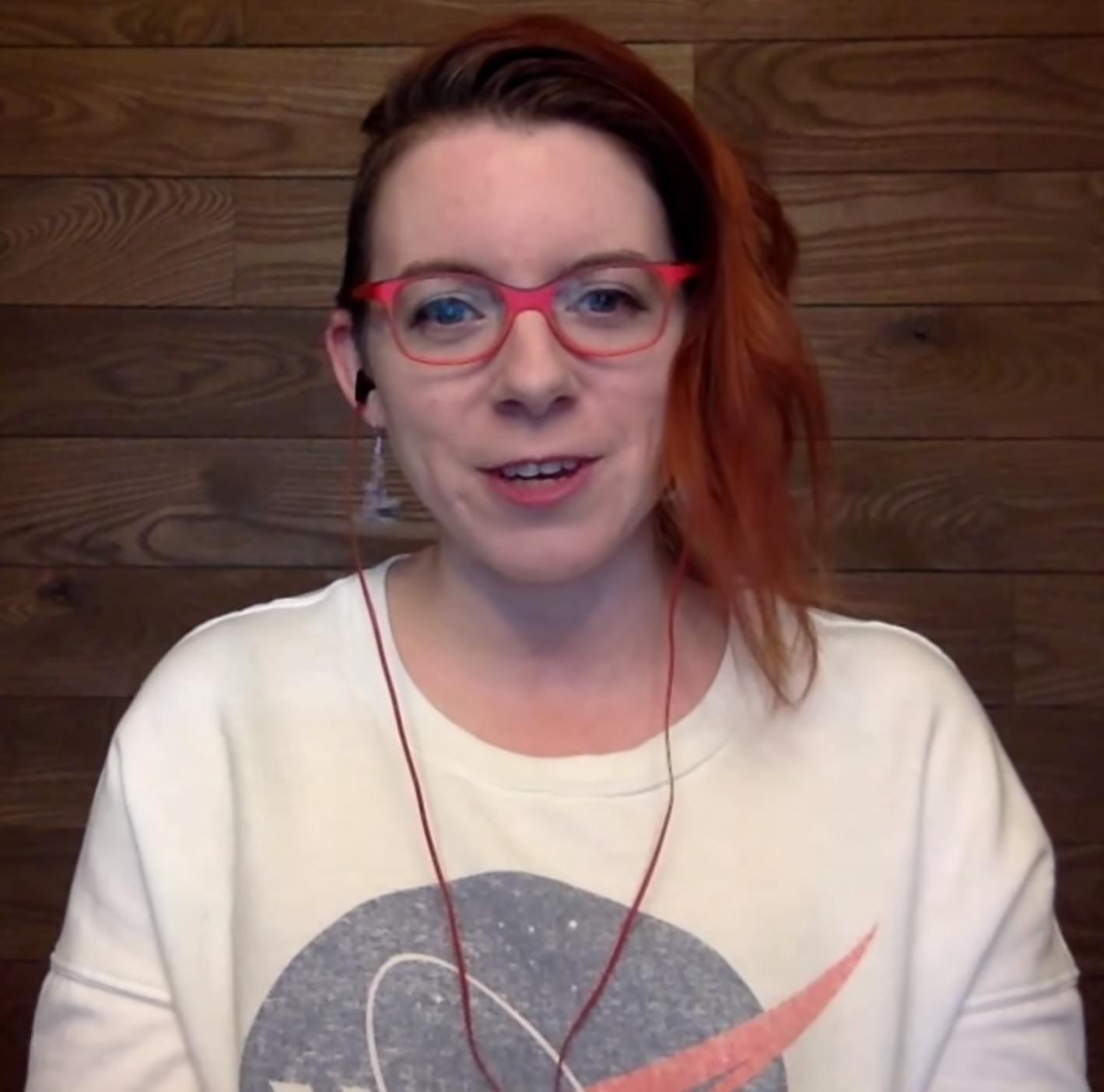
- Harrison speaks about Mars on TMRO in 2019
- Education: University of Washington (BS); Wesleyan University(MS); University of Western Ontario (PhD)
- Scientific career
- Fields: Planetary science Martian geomorphology
- Workplaces: Pacific Science Center; Malin Space Science Systems; Jet Propulsion Laboratory; The Planetary Society; Malin Space Science Systems; Planet Labs
- Thesis: Martian Gully Formation and Evolution: Studies From the Local to Global Scale (2016)
- Doctoral advisors: Gordon Osinski; Livio Tornabene

Tanya Harrison is a planetary scientist who was until March 2023 a manager of science programs at Planet Labs, working in their federal arm with science agencies to increase research use of Planet Labs' Earth observing satellite data. Previously, Harrison was the director of research at Arizona State University's Space Technology and Science Initiative, and was on the science team of the Mars Opportunity and Curiosity rovers.

== Education ==
At the age of five, Harrison watched Big Bird in Japan and became interested in space. She joined the Seattle chapter of Mars Society, and attended the 3rd International Mars Society Conference in Toronto.

Harrison completed her bachelor's degree in astronomy and physics at the University of Washington in 2006, before a masters degree in earth and environmental sciences at Wesleyan University in 2008. Harrison completed her PhD at the University of Western Ontario's Centre for Planetary Science and Space Exploration in 2016 while working under the direction of Gordon Osinski and Livio Tornabene. Alongside her postgraduate studies, Harrison worked as a public outreach assistant.

== Research ==
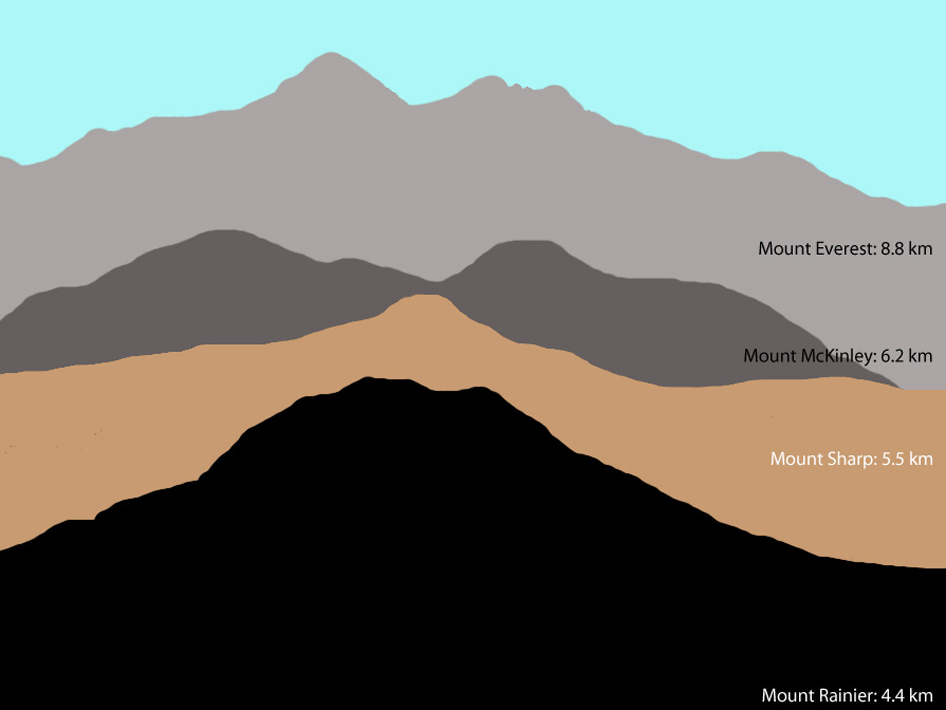
'Mount Sharp' Inside Gale Crater, Mars, created by Tanya Harrison.

Harrison's research is in Martian geomorphology and terrestrial analogues, spectroscopy and glaciology.

In 2008, Harrison became Assistant Staff Scientist at Malin Space Science Systems, after receiving a NASA scholarship. She worked on the science operation team for NASA's Mars Reconnaissance Orbiter. She also worked for the Mars Color Imager, the Mast Cameras and Mars Hand Lens Imager. During this time, Harrison worked on science track programming for Norwescon. Between 2010 and 2012, Harrison worked at The Planetary Society as web editor. In 2011, Harrison was part of the team that won the NASA Group Achievement Award for the Mars Reconnaissance Orbiter. She won a second in 2013 as part of the Mars Science Laboratory Mast Camera team.

Harrison is a recipient of the Zonta Amelia Earhart Fellowship (awarded twice), the Vanier Canada Graduate Scholarship, and Geological Society of America On to the Future Award, among others. She worked as a research assistant in the Centre for Planetary Science & Exploration at the University of Western Ontario.

In 2016, she won the Geological Society of America Paul Pellas-Ryder Award. That year she became a postdoctoral scholar and director of research of the NewSpace Initiative at Arizona State University. She worked with commercial space companies (including Blue Origin and Bigelow Aerospace). Harrison has cited NASA's Mars Pathfinder mission as one of her biggest inspirations. She was selected for Planet's Science Ambassadors program for her work on gullies on Devon Island, Canada, as an analogue for Martian gullies.

== Public engagement ==
In 2017, Harrison joined a flight of scientists to watch the total solar eclipse from an airplane. She is also a professional photographer. Harrison has been involved with The Mars Society, National Space Society and Girl Scouts. She has contributed to New Scientist, Gizmodo, The Weather Network and Slate. Harrison has spoken of her struggles with harassment in the STEM workplace. She regularly appears in the public discussion of astronomy.
