= Clarence Syvertson =

NASA administrator (1926–2010)

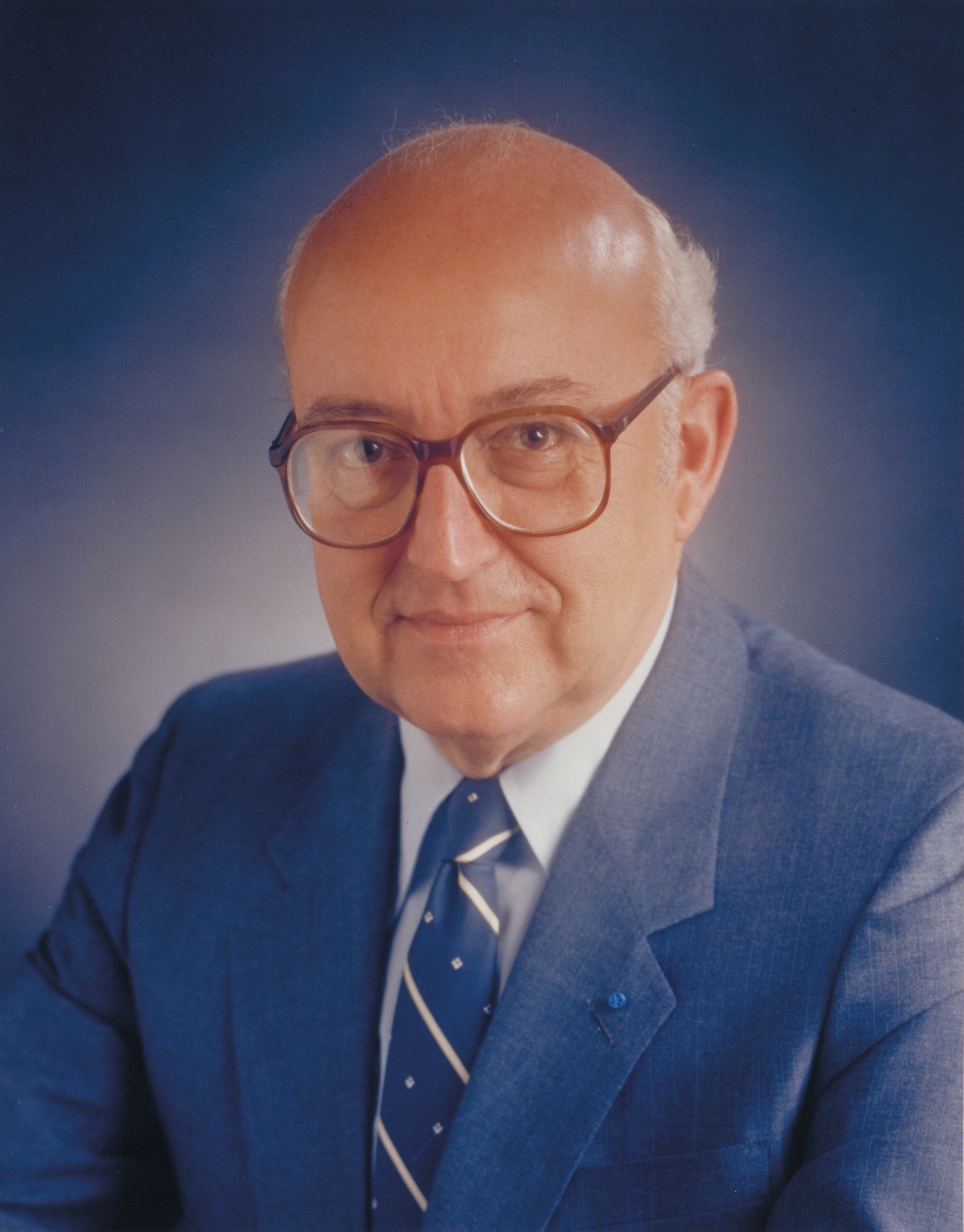
- Born: 1926; Minneapolis, Minnesota, US
- Died: September 13, 2010
- Education: University of Minnesota

Clarence A. "Sy" Syvertson (January 12, 1926 – September 13, 2010) was the Center Director of the Ames Research Center of the National Aeronautics and Space Administration, located at Moffett Field, California.

== Biography ==
=== Early life, education, and military service ===
Syvertson was born in Minneapolis, Minnesota in 1926. He graduated from the University of Minnesota with a Bachelor of Aeronautical Engineering (with Distinction) in 1946 at age 20. After serving in the US Army in 1946 - 1947, he returned to the University and earned a Master of Science in the same field in 1948. He also did graduate work at Stanford University and the Harvard Business School. He is a member of the National Academy of Engineering, a Fellow of the American Institute of Aeronautics and Astronautics, of the American Astronautical Society, and of the California Council on Science and Technology (emeritus), a member of Tau Beta Pi and Tau Omega honorary societies.

=== Aerodynamics research ===
In 1948, Syvertson joined Ames, then known as the Ames Aeronautical Laboratory of the National Advisory Committee for Aeronautics (N.A.C.A.). For the first decade he was engaged in aerodynamic research in the high supersonic and hypersonic speed ranges. His research led to some significant results including the design of the first lifting body entry vehicle, the NASA M2-F1, a research precursor to the Space Shuttle. Earlier work included development of the aerodynamic concept on which a Mach 3 experimental bomber, the XB-70 Valkyrie, was based. Only two XB-70s were ever built; one was lost in a mid-air collision and the other is now in the Air Force museum at Wright-Patterson Air Force Base in Dayton, Ohio. The potential threat of a force of Mach-3 Bombers led the Soviets to build an expensive defense system.

Syvertson also developed a new aerodynamic theory widely used to predict the stability of slender vehicles flying at Mach numbers from 3 to 6 including missiles and small launch vehicles, such as the Aerobee-Hi. Early in his career at Ames he also developed new methods for the design of nozzle contours for supersonic wind tunnels. These methods improved, significantly, the quality of flow in supersonic wind tunnels and were used to design the nozzle contours for most of the supersonic wind tunnels at Ames as well as many at other institutions. Syvertson's research contributions are contained in more than 30 technical reports which he authored or co-authored during this period. For his research, he received, in 1957, the Lawrence Sperry Award, which is given by the American Institute of Aeronautics and Astronautics to the outstanding young man in aeronautics.

=== Management career ===
In the late 1950s, Syvertson moved into management when he became responsible for the aerodynamic design and initial operation of the Ames 3.5-foot (1.1 m) Hypersonic Wind Tunnel which provides a test environment for vehicles traveling at Mach numbers from 5 to 14. After successfully completing this assignment, he established, staffed, and directed the Mission Analysis Division, a small "think-tank" organization created to study the research requirements of advanced aircraft and spacecraft and of missions of future interest to NASA. In this position, Syvertson first reported to Ames and later to NASA Headquarters. From this position, he went on to head the Astronautics Directorate at Ames, directing research in space physics, planetary atmospheres, entry aerothermodynamics, and hypersonic aerodynamics. He also had management responsibility for an advanced magnetometer experiment carried to the surface of the Moon on an early Apollo program mission. In 1969, he was named Deputy Director of Ames with primary responsibility for institutional management of the Center. As Deputy Director, Syvertson supervised the development of many of the management and budgeting systems used by Ames today; some of these systems have been adopted by other NASA centers.

=== Civil Aviation Research and Development Report ===
In 1970, Syvertson was asked to serve as the Executive Director of the Civil Aviation Research and Development (CARD) Policy Study. The resulting CARD report was considered a milestone in national policy for civil aviation research and development. For his efforts, Syvertson was awarded the NASA Exceptional Service Medal.

=== Director of Ames ===
In 1978, Syvertson was named Director of Ames, a post he held until his retirement in 1984. During this period Ames developed and flew the XV-15 Tilt Rotor Research Aircraft, research precursor to the V-22 Osprey. It expanded its research program in Human Factors and developed a related facility, the Manned Vehicle Systems Research Facility. The 40- by 80-foot (24 m) Wind Tunnel was modified with a new 80- by 120-foot (37 m) test chamber added, making the facility the largest wind tunnel in the world. During Syvertson's tenure, the center developed the telescope for the highly successful Infrared Astronomical Satellite (IRAS), a joint project of the Netherlands, Great Britain, and the United States. Ames also provided comprehensive test support for the development of the Space Shuttle. In 1981, NASA's Dryden Flight Research Center at Edwards Air Force Base in the Mojave desert was merged with Ames and Syvertson assumed management responsibility for both Ames Moffett and Ames Dryden. Syvertson received many awards for his leadership of Ames including the NASA Distinguished Service Medal, NASA's highest award, and election in 1981 to the National Academy of Engineering. In addition, the Regents of the University of Minnesota voted in 2003 to grant Syvertson the University's highest award, the honorary degree of Doctor of Science.

=== Death ===
Syvertson died on September 13, 2010.
