= List of coal mines in Canada =

According to the Coal Association of Canada, there are 24 permitted coal mines throughout Canada, 19 of which currently operate. The vast majority of the country's coal deposits can be found in British Columbia, Alberta, Saskatchewan and Nova Scotia.

== Alberta ==
Mining operations in Alberta produce lower and higher ranked coal. Low-ranked coals include subbituminous coal, brown coal, and lignite; high-ranked coals include bituminous coal and anthracite or hard coals.

Active coal mines in Alberta in 2019
Mine	Coal rank	Location	Owner/operator	Main use	Active?
Cheviot (Cardinal River)	Bituminous	Hinton	Teck Resources Teck Coal Ltd.	Export: metallurgical/steelmaking	The 51-year old mine ceased operations in June 2020. See also Coal in Alberta.
Coal Valley	Bituminous	Edson	Westmoreland Coal Co.	Export: thermal	Reopened Aug 2021
Dodds	Subbituminous	Ryley	Dodd's Coal Mining Company Ltd.	Small-scale sales	
Genesee	Sub-bituminous	Warburg	Capital Power LP / Westmoreland Coal Co.	Electricity: Genesee generating stations	
Grande Cache	Bituminous	Grande Cache	CST Canada Coal Ltd.	Export: metallurgical	The mine was shut down in May 2020 as global demand for coal decreased during the COVID-19 pandemic.
Highvale	Sub-bituminous	Wabamun, Parkland County	Transalta Corp / SunHills Mining LP	Thermal coal electricity: Keephills and Sundance generating stations	TransAlta Corp. said it would end operations at its Highvale thermal coal mine west of Edmonton by the end of 2021. (Note: TransAlta announced that the Highvale mine would be closing in 2023, which is 2030 provincial deadline. The Highvale mine, which has been in operation since 1970, was the largest surface coal mine in Canada. TransAlta is "switching to natural gas at all of its operated coal-fired plants in Canada".)
Sheerness/ Montgomery	Sub-bituminous	Hanna	Westmoreland Coal Co.	Electricity: Sheerness generating stations	The mine, which provided over 200 jobs in Hanna, was set to close by 2030.
Vista	Bituminous	Hinton	Bighorn Mining Ltd.	Export: thermal	

Mine as of 2014	Permitted?	Operator	Location	Size (ha)	Ref.
Cheviot	Yes	Teck	Hinton		
Coal Valley	Yes	Westmoreland Coal Company	Edson		
Genesee Mine	Yes	Westmoreland Coal Company	Edmonton		
Grande Cache	Yes	CST Canada Coal	Grande Cache		
Gregg River	No	Westmoreland Coal Company	Hinton		
Highvale Mine	Yes	TransAlta and SunHills Mining Partnership	Edmonton	12,600	
Obed Mountain	Yes	Westmoreland Coal Company	Hinton		
Paintearth Mine	Yes	Westmoreland Coal Company	Hanna		
Palisades	No	Altitudes Resources	Hinton	4,648	
Ryley	Yes	Dodds Coal	Edmonton		
Sheerness Mine	Yes	Westmoreland Coal Company	Hanna		
Vista	Yes	Cline	Hinton	10,000	

== British Columbia ==
Mine	Permitted?	Operator	Location	Size (ha)	Ref.
Arctos	No	Arctos Anthracite Joint Venture	Port of Prince Rupert	16,411	
Basin	No	Coalmont Energy Corp	Princeton		
Belcourt	No	Walter Energy's Canadian Operations	Chetwynd/Tumbler Ridge		
Bingay		Centermount Coal Limited	Elkford		
Brule Mine	Yes	Conuma Coal Resources Limited	Chetwynd		
Carbon Creek	No	Cardero Resource Corp.	Hudson's Hope		
Coal Creek	No	Crows Nest Pass Coal Mining	Elk Valley		
Coal Mountain Mine	Yes	Glencore	Sparwood	3,000	
Crown Mountain	No	Jameson Resources	Elk Valley		
Echo Hill	No	Hillsborough Resources	Tumbler Ridge		
Elkview Mine	Yes	Glencore	Sparwood	27,100	
Fording River Mine	Yes	Glencore	Elkford	23,000	
Gething	No	CKD Mines	Hudson's Hope		
Greenhills Mine	Yes	Glencore	Elkford	11,800	
Groundhog	No	Atrum Coal	Port of Prince Rupert		
Huguenot	No	Colonial Coal International Corporation	Quintette		
Line Creek Mine	Yes	Glencore	Sparwood	8,200	
Marten-Wheeler	No	Teck	Elk Valley		
Mt. Hudette/Brazion	No	Walter Energy's Canadian Operations	Chetwynd/Tumbler Ridge		
Murray River	No	HD Mining	Tumbler Ridge		
Quinsam Mine	Yes	Hillsborough Resources	Campbell River		
Quintette Mine Project	Yes	Conuma Resources	Tumbler Ridge		
Raven Coal Mine Project	No	Compliance Energy Corporation	Nanaimo	3,100	
Roman Mountain	Yes	Anglo American			
Saxon	No	Walter Energy's Canadian Operations	Chetwynd/Tumbler Ridge		
Sukunka Coal Mine Project	No	Xstrata Coal Canada	Tumbler Ridge		
Suska Coal Mine Project	No	Xstrata Coal Canada			
Trend Mine	Yes	Anglo American	Tumbler Ridge		
Willow Creek Mine	Yes	Conuma Resources	Chetwynd		
Wolverine Mine	Yes	Conuma Resources	Tumbler Ridge		

== Nova Scotia ==
Mine	Permitted?	Operator	Location	Size (ha)	Ref.
Donkin Coal Mine	Yes	Morien Resource Corporation	Donkin, Cape Breton County		
Point Aconi Surface Coal Mine	Yes	Pioneer Coal Limited	Point Aconi, Cape Breton County		
Stellarton Surface Coal Mine	Yes	Pioneer Coal Limited	Stellarton, Pictou County		

== Nunavut ==
Mine	Permitted?	Operator	Location	Size (ha)	Ref.
Fosheim Property	No	Canada Coal Inc.	Eureka		

== Saskatchewan ==
Mine	Permitted?	Operator	Location	Size (ha)	Ref.
Bienfait Mine	Yes	Westmoreland Coal Company (formerly Sherritt)	Estevan		
Border Mine	No	GoldSource Mines	Hudson Bay		
Boundary Dam	Yes	Westmoreland Coal Company (formerly Sherritt)	Estevan		
Poplar River Mine	Yes	Westmoreland Coal Company (formerly Sherritt)	Estevan		

== Yukon ==
Mine	Permitted?	Operator	Location	Size (ha)	Ref.
Division Mountain	No	Pitchblack Resources	Whitehorse		

== See also ==
- Coal in Alberta
- Coal in Canada
