= Endorsements in the 1928 Republican Party presidential primaries =

This is a list of endorsements for declared candidates in the Republican primaries for the 1928 United States presidential election.

== Herbert Hoover ==
List of Herbert Hoover endorsements

U.S. Executive Branch officials

Current

- Harry New, U.S. Postmaster General (1923–1929)
- Curtis Wilbur, U.S. Secretary of the Navy (1924–1929)
- Hubert Work, U.S. Secretary of the Interior (1923–1928)
- Theodore Douglas Robinson, Assistant Secretary of the Navy (1924–1929)
- Mabel Walker Willebrandt, U.S. Assistant Attorney General (1921–1929)
- Seymour Lowman, Assistant U.S. Secretary of the Treasury (1927–1932)
- Walter Folger Brown, Assistant U.S. Secretary of Commerce (1927–1929)
- Ogden L. Mills, U.S. Under Secretary of the Treasury (1927–1932)

Former

- George Wickersham, U.S. Attorney General (1909–1913)
- Theodore Roosevelt Jr., U.S. Assistant Secretary of the Navy (1921–1924)
- James Garfield, U.S. Secretary of the Interior (1907–1909)
- Claudius H. Huston, Assistant U.S. Secretary of Commerce
- Foster Bain, Director of the U.S. Bureau of Mines (1921–1924)

U.S. Senators

Current

- Samuel Shortridge, U.S. Senator from California (1921–1933)
- Frederic Sackett, U.S. Senator from Kentucky (1925–1930)
- Arthur Gould, U.S. Senator from Maine (1926–1931)
- Frederick Gillett, U.S. Senator from Massachusetts (1925–1931)
- James Couzens, U.S. Senator from Michigan (1922–1936)
- George Moses, U.S. Senator from New Hampshire (1918–1933)
- Walter Evans Edge, U.S. Senator from New Jersey (1919–1929)
- Jesse Metcalf, U.S. Senator from Rhode Island (1924–1937)
- Wesley Jones, U.S. Senator from Washington (1909–1932)

Former

- Frank Flint, U.S. Senator from California (1905–1911)
- Simon Guggenheim, U.S. Senator from Colorado (1907–1913)
- Joseph Frelinghuysen Sr., U.S. Senator from New Jersey (1917–1923)
- William Calder, U.S. Senator from New York (1917–1923)

U.S. Representatives

Current

- Harry Lane Englebright, U.S. Representative from CA-2 (1926–1943)
- Charles Curry, U.S. Representative from CA-3 (1913–1930)
- Florence Kahn, U.S. Representative from CA-4 (1925–1937)
- Richard Welch, U.S. Representative from CA-5 (1926–1949)
- Albert Carter, U.S. Representative from CA-6 (1925–1945)
- Henry Barbour, U.S. Representative from CA-7 (1919–1933)
- Arthur Free, U.S. Representative from CA-8 (1921–1933)
- William Evans, U.S. Representative from CA-9 (1927–1933)
- Joe Crail, U.S. Representative from CA-10 (1927–1933)
- Phil Swing, U.S. Representative from CA-11 (1921–1933)
- James Good, U.S. Representative from IA-5 (1909–1921)
- Maurice Thatcher, U.S. Representative from KY-5 (1923–1933)
- Katherine Langley, U.S. Representative from KY-10 (1927–1931)
- James Begg, U.S. Representative from OH-13 (1919–1929)
- Theodore Burton, U.S. Representative from OH-21 (1921–1928)
- Edith Rogers, U.S. Representative from MA-5 (1925–1960)
- John Ketcham, U.S. Representative from MI-4 (1921–1933)
- Louis Cramton, U.S. Representative from MI-7 (1913–1931)
- Walter Newton, U.S. Representative from MN-5 (1919–1929)
- Leonidas C. Dyer, U.S. Representative from MO-12 (1915–1933)
- Robert Bacon, U.S. Representative from NY-1 (1923–1938)
- Thaddeus Sweet, U.S. Representative from NY-32 (1923–1928)
- John Clarke, U.S. Representative from NY-34 (1927–1933)
- Gale Stalker, U.S. Representative from NY-37 (1923–1935)
- James Beck, U.S. Representative from PA-1 (1927–1933)
- George Graham, U.S. Representative from PA-2 (1913–1931)
- George Welsh, U.S. Representative from PA-6 (1923–1932)
- Thomas Butler, U.S. Representative from PA-8 (1923–1928)
- Cyrus Palmer, U.S. Representative from PA-13 (1927–1929)
- Robert Bushong, U.S. Representative from PA-14 (1927–1929)
- Louis McFadden, U.S. Representative from PA-15 (1915–1935)
- Edgar Kiess, U.S. Representative from PA-16 (1923–1930)
- Edward Beers, U.S. Representative from PA-18 (1923–1932)
- Isaac Doutrich, U.S. Representative from PA-19 (1927–1937)
- Russell Leech, U.S. Representative from PA-20 (1927–1932)
- Jacob Kurtz, U.S. Representative from PA-23 (1923–1933)
- Samuel Kendall, U.S. Representative from PA-24 (1927–1933)
- Henry Temple, U.S. Representative from PA-25 (1923–1933)
- J. Howard Swick, U.S. Representative from PA-26 (1927–1935)
- Nathan Strong, U.S. Representative from PA-27 (1917–1935)
- Thomas Cochran, U.S. Representative from PA-28 (1927–1933)
- Milton Shreve, U.S. Representative from PA-29 (1923–1933)
- Adam Wyant, U.S. Representative from PA-31 (1927–1933)
- Stephen Porter, U.S. Representative from PA-32 (1923–1930)
- M. Clyde Kelly, U.S. Representative from PA-33 (1923–1933)
- John Morin, U.S. Representative from PA-34 (1923–1929)
- Harry Estep, U.S. Representative from PA-35 (1927–1933)
- Guy Campbell, U.S. Representative from PA-36 (1923–1933)
- Richard Aldrich, U.S. Representative from RI-2 (1923–1933)
- Will Taylor, U.S. Representative from TN-2 (1919–1939)
- C. Bascom Slemp, U.S. Representative from VA-9 (1907–1923)
- Albert Johnson, U.S. Representative from RI-2 (1913–1933)

Former

- William Ward, U.S. Representative from NY-16 (1897–1899)
- William Hill, U.S. Representative from NY-34 (1919–1921)

Governors

Current

- C. C. Young, Governor of California (1927–1931)
- Flem Sampson, Governor of Kentucky (1927–1931)
- Alvan Fuller, Governor of Massachusetts (1925–1929)
- Fred Green, Governor of Michigan (1927–1931)
- Huntley Spaulding, Governor of New Hampshire (1927–1929)

Former

- James Goodrich, Governor of Indiana (1917–1921)
- Percival P. Baxter, Governor of Maine (1921–1925)
- Alex Groesbeck, Governor of Michigan (1921–1927)
- Samuel McKelvie, Governor of Nebraska (1919–1923)
- Edward Stokes, Governor of New Jersey (1905–1908)

Statewide officials

- William Maier, New York State Comptroller (1922)
- Ivan Bowen, frmr. Minnesota State Railroad and Warehouse Commissioner
- Charles S. Wilson, frmr. New York Commissioner of Agriculture
- Buron Fitts, Lt. Governor of California (1927–1928)

State legislators

- Robert Taft, Ohio State Representative (1921–1931)
- Chester Bolton, Ohio State Senator (1923–1928)
- Nettie B. Loughead, Ohio State Senator
- Howard Gray, Missouri State Senator

Local officials

- Ernest A. Balch, Mayor of Kalamazoo, Michigan (Democratic)
- Arthur E. Moreau, Mayor of Manchester, New Hampshire
- Ruth Baker Pratt, Alderman for New York City (1925–1929)
- Thad Brown, Ohio Secretary of State (1923–1927)
- Harry Routzohn, probate judge(1917–1929)
- Albert Beach, Mayor of Kansas City, Missouri (1924–1930)

Party officials

- Hamilton Fish Kean, Republican National Committeeman (R-NJ)
- Thomas P. Cheney, Republican State Committeeman chairman (R-NH)
- William Crocker, Republican State Committeeman chairman (R-CA)
- John Adams, Chair of the Republican National Committee (1921–1924)
- George B. Lockwood, frmr. Secretary of the Republican National Committee
- O. D. Street, Republican National Committeeman (R-AL)
- Maurice Maschke, Republican National Committeeman (R-OH)

Individuals

- Henry Ford, businessman
- William Donovan, soldier and lawyer
- Meier Steinbrink, lawyer
- William Thompson, President of Ohio State University
- Charles Taft, lawyer
- William Procter, head of Procter & Gamble
- John Hays Hammond, mining engineer, diplomat, and philanthropist
- Allen Hazen
- Walter Aldridge mining and metallurgical engineer
- Louis S. Cates mining engineer and businessman
- Lillian Gilbreth, psychologist, industrial engineer, consultant, and educator
- Mark Requa, mining engineer and petroleum conservationist
- Eugene McAuliffe, President of the Union Pacific Coal Company
- Samuel Vauclain, President of the Baldwin Locomotive Works
- George Akerson, journalist
- Edward Orton Jr., academic administrator, businessman, ceramic engineer, geologist, and philanthropist
- August Mencken, civil engineer and author
- Harry Guggenheim, businessman, diplomat, publisher, philanthropist, aviator, and horseman
- Michael Pupin, physicist, physical chemist and philanthropist
- Charles A. Stone, electrical engineer
- A.W. Berresford, President of the American Institute of Electrical Engineers
- Ambrose Swasey, mechanical engineer, inventor, entrepreneur, manager, astronomer, and philanthropist
- Elmer Sperry, inventor and entrepreneur
- Elihu Thomson, engineer and inventor
- John Quinn, national commander of the American Legion
- Harriot Stanton Blatch, writer and suffragist
- Amelita Galli-Curci, coloratura soprano
- Felix Warburg, banker
- John Philip Sousa, composer and conductor
- George Haven Putnam, publisher, soldier, and writer
- Anthony Fiala, explorer
- Daniel Beard, illustrator, author, youth leader, Georgist and social reformer
- Christopher Morley, journalist, novelist, essayist and poet
- Ernest Poole, journalist, novelist, and playwright
- Sophie Kerr, writer
- Ellis Parker Butler, author
- Margaret Widdemer, poet and novelist
- Meade Minnigerode, writer
- Arthur Guiterman, writer
- Will Irwin, author, writer and journalist
- Earl Derr Biggers, novelist and playwright
- Jesse S. Phillips, lawyer, politician, and insurance executive
- Thomas C. Desmond, engineer
- Herman Bernstein, journalist, poet, novelist, playwright, translator, Jewish activist, and diplomat
- Clayton Hamilton, drama critic
- Mary Brooks Picken, author
- Annie Nathan Meyer, author
- Edmund Pearson, librarian and author
- Clarence Perry, urban planner, sociologist, author, and educator
- Thomas Edison, inventor and businessman

Organizations

Newspapers

- Scripps-Howard Newspapers
- The Philadelphia Inquirer

== Frank Lowden ==
List of Frank Lowden endorsements

U.S. Executive Branch officials

- Charles Dawes, U.S. Vice President from Illinois (1925–1929)

U.S. Senators

- Charles McNary, U.S. Senator from Oregon (1918–1944)
- Peter Norbeck, U.S. Senator from South Dakota (1921–1936)
- William McMaster, U.S. Senator from South Dakota (1925–1931)

U.S. Representatives

- Lester Dickinson, U.S. Representative from IA-10 (1919–1931)
- William Johnson, U.S. Representative from IL-13 (1925–1933)
- John Allen, U.S. Representative from IL-14 (1925–1933)
- William Hull, U.S. Representative from IL-16 (1923–1933)
- Homer Hall, U.S. Representative from IL-17 (1927–1933)
- William Holaday, U.S. Representative from IL-18 (1923–1933)
- Charles Adkins, U.S. Representative from IL-19 (1925–1933)
- Edward Irwin, U.S. Representative from IL-22 (1925–1931)
- Thomas Williams, U.S. Representative from IL-24 (1915–1929)
- Edward Denison, U.S. Representative from IL-25 (1915–1931)

Governors

Current

- Adam McMullen, Governor of Nebraska (1925–1929)

Former

- Oliver Shoup, Governor of Colorado (1919–1923)
- Arthur Hyde, Governor of Missouri (1921–1925)
- L. B. Hanna, Governor of North Dakota (1913–1917)

Statewide officials

- Omer Custer, Illinois State Treasurer (1925–1927)

State legislators

- Alonzo Lindley, Ohio State Senator
- Clarence Buck, Illinois State Senator
- Peter B. Lennon, Michigan State Senator
- Claude H. Mackenzie, Minnesota State Senator (1918–1926)
- John Schumann, Wisconsin State Senator (1923–1931)

Local officials

Party officials

- Willis Stern, Republican State chairman for Iowa

Individuals

- Milton Foreman, Lieutenant General

Organizations

- Nonpartisan League of North Dakota

Newspapers

== George Norris ==
List of George Norris endorsements

U.S. Executive Branch officials

U.S. Senators

- William Borah, U.S. Senator from Idaho (1907–1940)
- Smith Brookhart, U.S. Senator from Iowa (1927–1933)
- Henrik Shipstead, U.S. Senator from Minnesota (1923–1947) (Farmer-Labor)
- Robert Howell, U.S. Senator from Nebraska (1923–1933)
- Gerald Nye, U.S. Senator from North Dakota (1925–1945)
- Lynn Frazier, U.S. Senator from North Dakota (1923–1941)
- Robert La Follette Jr., U.S. Senator from Wisconsin (1925–1947)
- John Blaine, U.S. Senator from Wisconsin (1927–1933)

U.S. Representatives

- Joseph Beck, U.S. Representative from WI-7 (1921–1929)

Governors

Statewide officials

- Herman Ekern, Attorney General of Wisconsin (1923–1927)

State legislators

Local officials

- Philip La Follette, District attorney from Wisconsin (1925–1927)

Party officials

Individuals

- Christian Sorensen, lawyer
- Margretta Dietrich, suffragette and activist

Organizations

Newspapers

== Charles Curtis ==
List of Charles Curtis endorsements

U.S. Executive Branch officials

U.S. Senators

- Arthur Capper, U.S. Senator from Kansas (1919–1949)

U.S. Representatives

- Daniel Anthony Jr., U.S. Representative from KS-1 (1907–1929)
- Ulysses Guyer, U.S. Representative from KS-2 (1927–1943)
- William Sproul, U.S. Representative from KS-3 (1923–1931)
- Homer Hoch, U.S. Representative from KS-4 (1919–1933)
- James Strong, U.S. Representative from KS-5 (1919–1933)
- Hays White, U.S. Representative from KS-6 (1919–1929)
- Clifford Hope, U.S. Representative from KS-7 (1927–1943)

Governors

- Benjamin S. Paulen, Governor of Kansas (1925–1929)

Statewide officials

- William Johnston, Chief Justice of the Kansas Supreme Court (1903–1935)
- William Hutchinson, Associate Justice of the Kansas Supreme Court (1927–1939)
- William Harvey, Associate Justice of the Kansas Supreme Court (1923–1945)
- Richard Hopkins, Associate Justice of the Kansas Supreme Court (1923–1929)
- John Marshall, Associate Justice of the Kansas Supreme Court (1915–1931)
- John Dawson, Associate Justice of the Kansas Supreme Court (1915–1937)
- Lorraine Elizabeth Wooster, Kansas State Superintendent of Public Instruction (1919–1923)

State legislators

Local officials

Party officials

Individuals

- Joseph Steinberg, former New York State Assemblyman for District 15 (1919–1924)

Organizations

Newspapers

== Frank Willis ==
List of Frank Willis endorsements

U.S. Executive Branch officials

- Carmi Thompson, U.S. Treasurer (1912–1913)

U.S. Senators

- Simeon Fess, U.S. Senator from Ohio (1923–1935)

U.S. Representatives

- Roy Fitzgerald, U.S. Representative from OH-3 (1921–1931)
- William Fitzgerald, U.S. Representative from OH-4 (1925–1929)
- Charles Thompson, U.S. Representative from OH-5 (1919–1931)
- Charles Kearns, U.S. Representative from OH-6 (1915–1931)
- Charles Brand, U.S. Representative from OH-7 (1923–1933)
- Thomas Jenkins, U.S. Representative from OH-10 (1925–1959)
- John Speaks, U.S. Representative from OH-12 (1921–1931)
- C. Ellis Moore, U.S. Representative from OH-15 (1919–1933)
- B. Frank Murphy, U.S. Representative from OH-18 (1919–1933)
- Charles Knight, U.S. Representative from OH-14 (1921–1923)

Governors

Statewide officials

State legislators

- Lee Beaty, Ohio State Representative (1917–1920)

Local officials

Party officials

- Wilma Sinclair Levan, Republican National Committeewoman (R-OH)

Individuals

- Frank Seiberling, innovator and entrepreneur

Newspapers

Organizations

== James Watson ==
List of James Watson endorsements

U.S. Executive Branch officials

U.S. Senators

U.S. Representatives

- Harry Rowbottom, U.S. Representative from IN-1 (1925–1931)
- Noble Johnson, U.S. Representative from IN-5 (1925–1931)
- Richard Elliott, U.S. Representative from IN-6 (1917–1931)
- Ralph Updike, U.S. Representative from IN-7 (1925–1929)
- Albert Henry Vestal, U.S. Representative from IN-8 (1917–1932)
- Fred Purnell, U.S. Representative from IN-9 (1917–1933)
- William R. Wood, U.S. Representative from IN-10 (1915–193)
- Albert Hall, U.S. Representative from IN-11 (1925–1931)
- David Hogg, U.S. Representative from IN-12 (1925–1933)
- Andrew Hickey, U.S. Representative from IN-13 (1919–1931)

Governors

Statewide officials

State legislators

Local officials

Party officials

Individuals

Newspapers

Organizations
