= Cominco =

Canadian mining company (1906–2001)

- Founded: 9 January 1906
- Defunct: 23 July 2001
- Fate: Merged into Teck Resources as a subsidiary
- Successor: Teck Cominco Metals Ltd. (2001–2009); Teck Metals Ltd. (2009–present)
- Headquarters: Montreal (1906–1972); Vancouver (1972–2001)

The Consolidated Mining and Smelting Company of Canada Limited, and from 1966 onwards Cominco Ltd., was a Canadian mining company that existed from 1906 to 2001. Cominco was created by the Canadian Pacific Railway through the consolidation of a number of mining, smelting, and power assets in the British Columbia Interior. At its inception, the company's main asset was the Trail smelter, which serviced a variety of mines in the region. Sulphur dioxide pollution from the smelter, which crossed into the United States, became a major problem and led to an international tribunal in 1927 to remedy the situation.

Cominco grew through the 1910s and 1920s, and by the 1930s had become a major industrial concern. Besides its metals production, the company diversified into chemicals and fertilizers. In both world wars, Cominco was a major supplier of raw materials to the Canadian and British governments. Cominco grew to become an international mining company and one of the world's largest zinc producers.

Canadian Pacific remained Cominco's majority shareholder until 1986. That year, following a period of poor performance, the CPR sold its share in the company to a consortium of Teck, Metallgesellschaft, and Mount Isa Mines. By 1994, Teck had bought out the other partners and controlled just under half of Cominco. In July 2001, following major consolidation in the mining industry, Teck acquired all of Cominco's outstanding stock and made Cominco a wholly owned subsidiary. Cominco, which was renamed Teck Cominco metals in 2001 and Teck Metals in 2009, has remained a subsidiary since that time.

== History ==
=== Pre-history ===
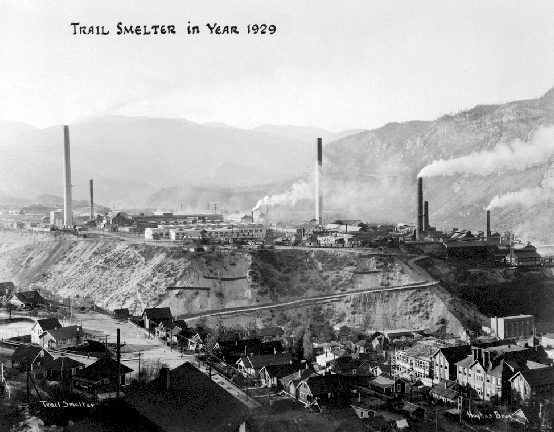
The Trail smelter, shown in 1929.

The origins of Cominco lie in the British Columbia gold rushes of the second half of the 19th century. The influx of prospectors led to the creation of the Colony of British Columbia in 1858 and the development of transportation networks in the province. Following the discovery of gold in the Kootenays, steamboat service on the Columbia River improved access to the region for miners.

In 1891, the American-owned Le Roi Mining and Smelting Company sought to build a smelter to service the mines around Rossland. The company hired Frederick Augustus Heinze (1869–1914) to lead the development of the smelter in Trail. By 1896 the new Trail smelter was completed and Heinze organised its operations as the British Columbia Smelting and Refining Company Limited, incorporated in New Jersey. The company's assets included the smelter, various mines, railways, railway charters, and land grants. Heinze put his new company up for sale in 1898 and attracted the interest of the Canadian Pacific Railway, which was uninterested in the mines but wanted the railway assets. The CPR hired Walter Hull Aldridge (1867–1959) to negotiate the purchase. The smelter came under the ownership of the British Columbia Southern Railway, a CPR subsidiary. Over the ensuing years, Aldridge installed three lead blast furnaces and doubled the smelter's capacity. Bullion from the smelter was shipped to San Francisco for refining while the lead was sold in Eastern Canada and Asia.

=== Formation of the company, 1906 ===
In 1906, Aldridge convinced the CPR to merge its various interests in the region into a single company. On 9 January 1906, Canadian Consolidated Mines Limited was incorporated by order-in-council under a federal charter. The founding directors were Henry Smith Osler, Frank C. Ford, George Charles Loveys, William Wellington Livingston, James Miller Ewing, and Britton Bath Osler. Canadian Consolidated was authorised to acquire all outstanding capital stock of the St Eugene Consolidated Mining Company Limited, the Centre Star Mining Company Limited, the Trail Smelter, and the Rossland Power Company Limited. The company was capitalised at $5.5 million divided into 55,000 shares. Just over a month later, on 14 February the company changed its name to the Consolidated Mining and Smelting Company of Canada Limited.

Cominco's first president was Wilmot Deloui Matthews (1850–1919) of Toronto. George Sumner of Montreal was the vice-president, while Aldridge was managing director. Rounding out the company's directorate were Sir Edmund Boyd Osler of Toronto, Charles Hosmer of Montreal, Henry Smith Osler of Toronto, and W. L. Matthews of Toronto.

=== Canadian Pacific era, 1906–1986 ===
In its early years, the Trail smelter was supplied by gold-copper ore from the Rossland mines, lead-silver ore purchased from mines around Slocan and Kaslo, and lead-silver ore from the St. Eugene mine at Moyie. Cominco sought to find new sources of ore, and in 1908 acquired a lease on the Sullivan Mine at Kimberley, which had been discovered in 1892. To that date, the mine had been unsuccessful due to difficulty treating its complex lead-zinc-iron ore. In 1910, Cominco exercised its option to buy the mine.

During World War I, Cominco produced zinc for the Imperial Munitions Board. In 1916 the company built a new electrolytic zinc plant at trail that produced 30 tonnes daily, using zinc-ore from the Sullivan Mine. By the end of the war, Cominco had produced 20,000 tonnes of zinc. In 1917, Randolph William Diamond (1891–1978) developed a new separation technique for the Sullivan ore, and by 1920 it was applied commercially. The method – which allowed for the separation of ore into zinc concentrate, lead concentrate, and iron concentrate – allowed for the rapid growth of the company. In 1923, a new concentrator at Sullivan was completed, relieving the load on the Trail separator. By 1924, lead production had risen 64 per cent.

Cominco's metallurgical operations produced significant sulphur dioxide pollution that crossed into the United States and that was damaging crops along the Columbia River valley. In 1927, an International Joint Commission was struck and assessed Cominco with $350,000 in damages. In 1941, the company was assessed a further $78,000. To avoid the damage caused by its byproducts, Cominco began to produce chemical fertilizers from sulphuric acid. By 1930, the company had three sulphuric acid plants and was selling fertilizer under the Elephant brand.

During the depression, crop production decreased, resulting in a diminished need for fertilizer. Consequently, the company began using its sulphur dioxide to produce elemental sulphur. By the middle of the decade, it returned to fertilizer production at full capacity. Also during the 1930s, Cominco began developing mines in the territories. Of these, only the Con Mine was profitable.

Cominco opened two new mines in British Columbia during World War II to produce tungsten for armour-piercing shells, and to provide coal for the Trail smelter. The company also produce mercury for bomb detonators at the Pinchi mine. Cominco supplied the British government with zinc and lead. A new company, the Alberta Nitrogen Company Limited, was formed to operate a nitrogen plant in Calgary. In 1942, the company began producing heavy water, and began sending 100 pounds per month to Ohio.

After the war, Cominco opened new mines including the Bluebell (lead-zinc), H. B. (zinc-lead), and Pine Point (zinc-lead). In the 1950s, the company diversified through the acquisitions of the Canada Metal Company and National Hardware Specialties Limited. In 1962, it formed Cominco Binani Zinc Ltd. in southern India to build an electrolytic zinc smelter and a sulphuric acid plant. By 1969 the plant came online. In 1964, Cominco partnered with the Mitsubishi Metal Mining Company to build a lead smelter. That same year, Cominco acquired Western Canada Steel Limited.

Cominco was a long-time sponsor of the Trail Smoke Eaters, whose name referenced the smelter. Most of the players on the club's squad that won the 1961 Ice Hockey World Championships were employees of Cominco.

Cominco formed an American subsidiary in 1966, called Cominco American Incorporated. Cominco American originated in the Montana Phosphate Products Company, which Cominco had acquired in the late 1920 and which provided phosphate rock to the smelter. Montana Phosphate also had discovered a deposit in Salem, Missouri containing lead, zinc, and copper. Cominco American acquired another American subsidiary, Cominco Products Inc., thus unifying the all Cominco's American operations in one company.

On 16 May 1966, Consolidated changed its name to Cominco Limited. That same year, Cominco formed Cominco Australian Pty Ltd. and Cominco Exploration Pty Ltd., two Australian subsidiaries, and in 1071 acquired a stake in Aberfoyle Ltd. During this period, Cominco engaged in exploration on the Iberian Peninsula and purchased a 47 per cent stake in Explotación Minera Internacional España, S.A. In 1968, Cominco partnered with Canadian Pacific to form Fording Coal. Cominco sold its share in the company to Canadian Pacific in 1985.

Cominco struggled through the 1980s. In 1980 and 1981, the company saw large drops in net earnings, and in 1982 it saw its first loss since 1932. By 1985, the company was C$1 billion in debt. In 1984, Cominco completed an upgrade of the Trail smelter that had begun in 1977. The upgrade included the world first zinc pressure leaching plant and a lead smelter feed plant. Cominco opened three new mines during the period: the Polaris, the Highland Valley, and the Buckhorn. The greatest success of the decade was the start of operations at the Red Dog mine.

=== Nunachiaq/Teck era, 1986–2001 ===
In October 1986, a group of companies comprising Teck Corporation of Vancouver, Metallgesellschaft of Germany, and MIM Holdings of Australia, formed Nunachiaq Inc. to acquire part of the Canadian Pacific stake in Cominco. Teck would have a half share in Nunachiaq, while Metallgesellschaft and MIM each would have a quarter. Nunachiaq acquired around 28 per cent of Cominco from Canadian Pacific for $472 million, while CP's remaining 24 per cent stake in the company was sold to the public. In 1987, Cominco once again was profitable, and in 1988 debt was reduced to C$344 million. In 1990, Cominco discovered mineralization at Cerattepe, and that same year opened the Pebble Mine in Alaska.

By 1991, the three partners had acquired an additional 17 per cent of Cominco individually. Between their shares of Nunachiaq and their individual holdings, Teck controlled 22.5 per cent of Cominco, Metallgesellschaft 11.25 per cent, and MIM 11.25 per cent.

In October 1991, Metallgesellschaft swapped its 25 per cent share of Nunachiaq with MIM in exchange for new MIM stock and for MIM's holdings in Teck. After the deal concluded, Teck and MIM each owned half of Nunachiaq. In February 1994, MIM sold its half share in Nunachiaq (or 14 per cent of Cominco) to Teck for $215 million. At this time, Teck controlled 45 per cent of Cominco. In 1994, Cominco began production at the Quebrada Blanca mine in Chile and discovered the Kudz Ze Kayah deposit in the Yukon.

In August 2000, Teck made a successful bid for 4 million Cominco shares at $25 per, which gave it a 49.96 share in the company. Shortly thereafter, Teck increased its position to 50.1 per cent.

=== Merger into Teck, 2001 ===
At Cominco's annual meeting on 26 April 2001, chairman Keevil told shareholders that a merger between Teck and Cominco would be "logical," and suggested it would happen within two years. However, on 30 April the directors of both companies announced a plan for Teck to acquire the remainder of Cominco. Per the deal, Teck would offer 1.8 of its own shares plus $6 in cash for each Cominco share. In total, the deal would be worth C$1.6 billion, and would make Teck a C$3 billion company. On 17 July, Cominco shareholders approved the takeover by 83.93 per cent. The deal was completed on 23 July 2001, at which time Cominco was renamed Teck Cominco Metals Ltd. and became a wholly owned subsidiary of Teck. On 10 September, Teck Corporation shareholders voted to change the company's name Teck Cominco Limited, which was approved and came into effect two days later.

On 23 April 2009, Teck Cominco Limited (the former Teck Corporation) was renamed Teck Resources Limited. On 1 June 2009, Teck Cominco Metals Ltd. (the former Cominco) was renamed Teck Metals Ltd., which it remains today.

== Leadership ==
=== President ===
1. Wilmot Deloui Matthews, 9 January 1906 – 24 May 1919 †
2. James John Warren, 10 July 1919 – 28 January 1939 †
3. Selwyn Gwillym Blaylock, 28 April 1939 – 26 April 1945
4. Reuben Ewart Stavert, 26 April 1945 – 23 April 1959
5. William Stafford Kirkpatrick, 23 April 1959 – 28 April 1966
6. Robert Hendricks, 28 April 1966 – 31 December 1971
7. Frederick Ewart Burnet, 1 January 1972 – 25 April 1973
8. Gerald Henry Danby Hobbs, 25 April 1973 – 20 April 1978
9. Myles Norman Anderson, 20 April 1978 – 24 April 1980
10. William George Wilson, 24 April 1980 – 16 October 1986
11. Robert Edward Hallbauer, 16 October 1986 – 31 December 1994
12. David Anthony Thompson, 1 January 1995 – 23 July 2001

=== Chairman of the Board ===
1. Sir Edward Wentworth Beatty, 28 April 1939 – 23 March 1943 †
2. Selwyn Gwillym Blaylock, 1943 – 19 November 1945 †
3. D'Alton Corry Coleman, 11 March 1946 – April 1947
4. Reuben Ewart Stavert, 23 April 1959 – 23 April 1964
5. William Stafford Kirkpatrick, 23 April 1964 – 31 December 1971
6. Robert Hendricks, 1 January 1972 – 25 April 1973
7. Frederick Ewart Burnet, 25 April 1973 – 20 April 1978
8. Gerald Henry Danby Hobbs, 20 April 1978 – 24 April 1980
9. Myles Norman Anderson, 24 April 1980 – 16 October 1986
10. Norman Bell Keevil Jr., 16 October 1986 – 23 July 2001

† = died in office

== Company histories ==
- Thomas Ryland Roden, The Development of the Consolidated Mining and Smelting Company of Canada Limited, dissertation, Queen's University, 1937.
- Rebecca M. Bratspies and Russell A. Miller (eds), Transboundary Harm in International Law: Lessons from the Trail Smelter Arbitration, Cambridge University Press, 2009.
