= List of newspapers named Record =

Record is a common name for daily newspapers:

== United States ==
=== Northeast ===
==== New York ====
- Times Herald-Record, formed from the (Middletown) Daily Record, Middletown, New York
- Columbia University Record
- The Record (Troy) (1896-present), Troy, New York

==== Boston ====
- The Boston Record (1884–1961), merged into the Record American and eventually the Boston Herald
- Boston Record-American
- The Boston News-letter, and City Record (1825–1826)

==== Pennsylvania ====
- The Philadelphia Record (1877–1947)
- The Public Record (1999–present), Philadelphia, Pennsylvania
- York Daily Record (1796–present), York, Pennsylvania

==== Other ====
- The Record (North Jersey)

=== South ===
- News & Record, formed from the Daily Record, Greensboro, North Carolina
- Times Record News (1907-present), Wichita Falls, Texas
- Columbia Record (1897–1988), Columbia, South Carolina

=== West ===
- The Record (Stockton, California) (1895–2013?)
- Daily Record (Washington)
- Chico Enterprise-Record (California)

== Europe ==
- Record, a Portuguese sports newspaper

== See also ==
- RecordTV
  - Record News, Brazilian TV news channel
