= Charles Brinckerhoff =

American engineer (1901–1987)

Charles McFarlan Brinckerhoff
- Born: March 15, 1901; Minnesota, U.S.
- Died: April 22, 1987 (aged 86); Beacon, New York, U.S.
- Education: Columbia University
- Occupations: Industrialist; engineer
- Employer: Anaconda Copper
- Awards: Hoover Medal (1979); William Lawrence Saunders Gold Medal (1968)

Charles McFarlan Brinckerhoff (15 March 1901 Minneapolis – April 22, 1987) was an American engineer and businessman who was formerly the chairman and CEO of Anaconda Copper, the world's largest producer of copper. He was a recipient of the Hoover Medal and the William Lawrence Saunders Gold Medal.

== Biography ==
Brinckerhoff was born on March 15, 1901, in Minnesota and grew up in Elmhurst, Queens. He earned a bachelor's degree from Columbia College in 1922 and a graduate degree in engineering from Columbia School of Mines in 1925.

After graduating from Columbia, he was an engineer for the Phelps Dodge Corporation at Morenci, Arizona. He later felt the need to learn practical mining and joined Inspiration mine as a miner, working his way up to be a foreman, and was made engineer. At Inspiration, he introduced numerous improvements in the practice of caving, which were employed by caving operations throughout the world.

In 1935, he took the position of an assistant mine superintendent at the Potrerillos mine. In 1945, he was made general manager of that operation. From 1945 to 1948, he was general manager of the Chile Exploration Company, which owned the Chuquicamata mine, the largest copper mine in the world. Under his leadership, the production doubled, and the pay for workers at the mine became the third highest in the world.

In the early 1950s, Brinckerhoff was offered to join Southern Peru Copper Corporation as general manager and president. When he tendered his resignation, Clyde Weed, then CEO of Anaconda Copper, revealed that he was destined to succeed him as CEO of the company. In 1958, Brinckerhoff was promoted president of the parent organization, Anaconda Copper, and in 1964 its chief executive officer.

In 1965, he became chairman of Anaconda Copper, a position he held until his retirement in 1969, ending his 23 year-career in Chile.

After retiring, he was a consultant to the Shah of Iran and helped develop the Sarcheshme Copper Mine. He also took part in the negotiations that led to the "Chilenizacion" of copper mines under President Eduardo Frei Montalva in 1971.

== Awards ==
In 1956, the Chilean government bestowed upon him the Order of Bernardo O'Higgins, the highest award Chile makes to non-nationals for distinguished service to the country.

In 1961, Columbia School of Engineering and Applied Science awarded Brinckerhoff the Egleston medal, the university's highest award for "distinguished engineering achievement".

Brinckerhoff was also the recipient of the William Lawrence Saunders Gold Medal in 1968, bestowed by the American Institute of Mining, Metallurgical, and Petroleum Engineers for "outstanding administrative and technical ability, and for discerning foresight and leadership in the minerals industry."

In 1979, he was awarded the Hoover Medal for being a "distinguished mining and metallurgical engineer; leader in converting world resources into metals needed by man; expander of the base of higher education; exponent of improved human relations as the basis for industrial advancement; friend of developing countries; diplomat; humanitarian".

== Personal life ==
Brinckerhoff married Florence Andreen in 1935. They had one daughter, Carol Kietzman. He died of pneumonia on April 22, 1987, at the Lenox Hill Hospital at age 86.

== Bibliography ==
=== References ===
- AIME (American Institute of Mining, Metallurgical, and Petroleum Engineers).
1. "Awards & Scholarships":
  1. 1968: AIME William Lawrence Saunders Gold Medal. "Charles M. Brinckerhoff (SME)" ("For outstanding administrative and technical ability, and for discerning foresight and leadership in the minerals industry."). Archived from the original on August 4, 2021.
  2. 1979: Hoover Medal. "Charles Brinckerhoff" ("Distinguished mining and metallurgical engineer; leader in converting world resources into metals needed by man; expander of the base of higher education; exponent of improved human relations as the basis for industrial advancement; friend of developing countries; diplomat; humanitarian."). Archived from the original on August 4, 2021.
- ASME (The American Society of Mechanical Engineers).
1. 2007: "Past Hoover Medal Recipients": "1979, Charles M. Brinckerhoff". Archived from the original on January 2, 2026.
- Columbia University Record. New York (Morningside Heights): Columbia University. curecordarchive.library.columbia.edu; LCCN sn84-6222; ISSN 0747-4504; OCLC 10880244 (all editions).
1. "Noted Alumnus": "Charles M. Brinckerhoff". Vol. 12, no. 28. May 1, 1987. p. 2 (column 2, bottom half).
  1. Digitized image of original – via Columbia.
  2. Pdf download (full issue) – via Columbia.
- Minería chilena [Chilean Mining] (magazine; monthly). Santiago & Puerto Montt, Chile. LCCN 89-661254; ISSN 0716-1042; OCLC 13385967 (all editions).
1. Baros, María Celia M. (October 14, 2008). "De Minnesota a Chuquicamata" ["From Minnesota to Chuquicamata"] (in Spanish). Archived from the original on July 18, 2015.
Deck (subhead), translated from Spanish to English: "The distinguished American engineer was a key figure in twentieth-century Chilean mining, having held strategic positions in Potrerillos and Chuquicamata and contributing to the development of El Salvador and Exótica." [for the Exótica Mine, see Chuquicamata § Anaconda Copper era (1923–1971)]
- NAE (National Academy of Engineering). Part of the National Academies of Sciences, Engineering, and Medicine.
1. Malozemoff, Plato (1909–1997) (1987). Charles M. Brinckerhoff, 1901–1987 (obituary). Archived from the original on September 30, 2020.
- National Mining Hall of Fame and Museum. Leadville, Colorado. → mininghalloffame.org
1. "Charles M. Brinckerhoff" (Induction Year: 1995 → Inductee Number 119). Archived from the original on August 4, 2021.
- New York Times (The). LCCN sn00-61556; ISSN 0362-4331, ISSN 1553-8095 (online).
1. "Columbia to Honor Anaconda Head" (obituary). Vol. 111, no. 37890. October 20, 1961. p. 19. Retrieved August 4, 2021.
  1. Via TimesMachine blog.
  2. Via TimesMachine.
  3. Pdf via TimesMachine (PDF).
  4. Permalink via TimesMachine.
  5. Via ProQuest 116864504 (ProQuest database → Historical Newspapers: Global).
2. "Anaconda Selects Brinckerhoff as Chairman and Chief Officer — Executive Has Spent All but 2 Years of Career In Company – Extra Payment Voted". Vol. 114, no. 39206. May 28, 1965. p. 41. Retrieved August 4, 2021.
  1. Via TimesMachine blog.
  2. Via TimesMachine.
  3. Pdf via TimesMachine (PDF).
  4. Permalink via TimesMachine.
  5. Via ProQuest 116864504 (ProQuest database → Historical Newspapers: Global).
3. "Charles Brinckerhoff" (obituary). Vol. 114, no. 39206. April 22, 1987. p. 27 (section D). Retrieved August 4, 2021.
  1. Via TimesMachine blog.
  2. Via TimesMachine (digital image 112 of 112).
  3. Permalink via TimesMachine.
  4. Via ProQuest 426473850 (ProQuest database → Central).
  5. Via ProQuest 110783582 (ProQuest database → Historical Newspapers: Global).
- UPI Archives (April 22, 1987). Charles M. Brinckerhoff, Who Was Chairman of the Former Anaconda Co (obituary). Archived from the original on August 4, 2021.
