= Coal in Alberta =

Coal in Alberta is found in the Coalspur Formation in the Western Canada Sedimentary Basin in the foothills of southwestern Alberta. The Coalspur Formation, which has large quantities of high-quality coal, runs from south of the Wapiti River to the North Saskatchewan River. The Coalspur coal zone is about 120 metres (390 ft) to 200 metres (660 ft) thick.

Coal formations in what is now the province of Alberta, originated approximately 140 and 65 million years ago. The collision between the two immense plates had pushed up the Rocky Mountains while depressing the North American continent's interior. New layers of growth crushed and buried layers of peat, shale, and sandstone, compressing them into coal beds. The oldest coal deposits were pushed closer to the surface about 80 to 55 million years ago, forming part of the Rocky Mountains's foothills and Front Ranges.

In 2018, Alberta's coal production totalled approximately 20 million tonnes and accounted for $10 million in royalties for the province, according to Alberta Energy's Coal and Mineral Development Unit's "2018 Year in Review". In the fiscal year 2019-2020 coal represented $11.8 million or 0.2% of Alberta's total non-renewable resource revenue of $5.9 billion.

For many years, Alberta relied on coal for electricity for years. When the Alberta New Democratic Party came to power in 2015, they legislated an end to the use of coal for power by 2030. This target was met six years ahead of schedule, and the last coal power plant in Alberta closed on June 16, 2024.

== Overview ==
According to a 2023 Pembina Institute article, coal in Alberta had become a sunset industry as the province underwent a rapid transition from coal-fired power to renewable energy sources such as solar and wind. In January 2023, solar power exceeded coal-fired power on the electricity grid for over 2 hours, a milestone that will become more common as Alberta phases out coal by the end of 2023. For the first time in decades, Alberta's electricity grid went without any input from the two remaining coal plants (Genesee 1 and 2) for several brief periods in early 2024, signaling the beginning of the end for coal power in the province. All of Alberta's coal-fired power plants will have closed or been converted to natural gas by the end of 2023, seven years ahead of the original 2030 phase-out schedule set in 2015.

== Western Canadian Sedimentary Basin ==
The International Journal of Coal Geology estimated that the Western Canadian Sedimentary Basin (WCSB) contained 90% of Canada's usable coal resources, rank from lignite to semianthracite. The vast sedimentary basin underlies 1,400,000 square kilometres (540,000 sq mi) of Western Canada including Alberta, southwestern Manitoba, southern Saskatchewan, northeastern British Columbia and the southwest corner of the Northwest Territories. This massive wedge of sedimentary rock extends from the Rocky Mountains in the west to the Canadian Shield in the east. This wedge is about 6 kilometres (3.7 mi) thick under the Rocky Mountains, but thins to zero at its eastern margins.

In 2005, Alberta Energy reported that approximately 36% of the total estimated 71,000 megatonnes of usable coal was bituminous, including a high proportion of medium to low volatile coals. Bituminous coal is used as coking feedstock because of its low sulfur content and acceptable ash levels. In 2005, most of the coal from the WCSB was exported to Japan, Korea and other countries due to a lack of heavy industry in the region. Canada consumes only a limited amount of the WCSB bituminous coal. The lower rank coals are used mainly for electricity generation, where the existence of shallow coal seams with little overburden make strip-mining and reclamation easy, and low sulfur levels reduce the environmental impact of their use.

== History ==
The Siksika —Blackfoot and the Kainai—Blood people, called the area now known as Lethbridge on the banks of the Oldman River—Sik-ooh-kotoki or "place of the black rocks."

In 1793, a British surveyor, Peter Fidler, working for the Hudson's Bay Company wrote about a seam of high-quality coal near the Red Deer River that he had used for heat.

Nicholas Sheran, an entrepreneur from New York City, opened a mine there on the west bank of Oldman River in 1874—making it the first commercial coal mine in Alberta. Sheran operated the mine until his death in 1882.

In the 1880s, Geological Survey of Canada's George Mercer Dawson, a surveyor and geologist, investigated and mapped potential coal and petroleum coal in western Canada, including Alberta. Dawson and was an influential advisor on the route of the Canadian Pacific Railway and on potential industries such as ranching, agriculture, lumber, and mining, including petroleum and coal—whose development he encouraged. His 1884 publication Descriptive Sketch of the Physical Geography and Geology of the Dominion of Canada on Canada's physiography, was the first of its kind.

Sir Alexander Galt, one of the fathers of the Canadian Confederation, and his son Elliott Torrance Galt—who was then the Assistant Indian Commissioner in southern Alberta—formed the North Western Coal and Navigation Company in 1882, to exploit coal resources in what is now southern Alberta with William Lethbridge as the company's largest shareholder and president. They hired a coal mine engineer and coal miners from Nova Scotia and developed a number of mines near present-day Lethbridge. By 1885, the rapidly growing community of Coalbanks was officially renamed Lethbridge. By 1889, Galt mines were producing 75,173 tonnes (82,864 tons).

The rich coal deposit developed by Galt and North Western Coal and Navigation Company, was one of the factors that resulted in the construction of the Canadian Pacific Railway's (CPR) main line from Lethbridge through the Crowsnest Pass in 1897 and 1898. Coal was shipped by the CPR to Calgary, British Columbia, Winnipeg, and the northwestern United States. Other towns that formed at that time included Coaldale, Coalhurst, and Black Diamond, Alberta.

In 1886, Queen Victoria granted a coal mining charter to Canmore in 1886 and the first coal mine opened in 1887.

During the world war, Drumheller became one of Western Canada's largest coal producers.

When a coal miners' strike broke out in January 1948, threatening the provincial Electrical grid, as most electricity was generated from coal. Manning acted swiftly to avert the crisis. Rewriting the province's labour laws in March to allow the government to shut down the strike. Greatly weakened by charges of communism, and Manning's unwillingness to fold caused the unions to attempt to persuade legislators instead of protesting using strikes, or violence. Manning's steadfast defiance in the face of union threats halted the rise of militant unionism in Alberta. As it did in other areas like Quebec and the rust belt.

In 1976, the Progressive Conservative government under then Premier Peter Lougheed restricted open-pit mines in most of Alberta's Rocky Mountains and Foothills through the Coal Development Policy. The last open pit coal mine in Alberta's Livingstone Range closed in 1983.

Coal mining flourished into the 20th century but by the 1970s the market for oil decreased. In 1979, Canmore Mines Ltd discontinued operations.

In 2015, because of a "glut of both thermal and metallurgical coal", the global price of coal was low.

In 2016, there was a dramatic increase in the price of metallurgical coal to over US$300/tonne. This was the first time the price of coal had reached this peak since 2011. Investors showed renewed interest in the bituminous metallurgical coal mining in Alberta.

In 2016, then NDP Premier Rachel Notley announced the elimination of all coal-fired power stations in the province by 2030.

Coal mines closed in the Crowsnest Pass, Canmore, Nordegg, and Grande Cache, among others.

By 2020, coal-fired power stations in operation in Alberta included the Battle River, Genesee, H.R. Milner, Keephills, Sheerness, and Sundance stations.

According to Alberta Energy's 2018 ' Review, there was an increase in bituminous coal mining activity following a decrease for several years. In 2018, mining operations have restarted, new greenfield operations began, and new mining projects were proposed. According to the Review two major factors contributed to the increase in coal mining activity−an increase in global coal prices and recent improvements in thermal coal.

By 2019, the Grande Cache mine reopened.

In the fiscal year 2019-2020 coal represented $11.8 million or 0.2% of Alberta's total non-renewable resource revenue of $5.9 billion.

On 1 June 2020, Premier Jason Kenney rescinded the 1976 Coal Policy and lifted the restrictions on coal mining exploration and development on 3 of the 4 categories of land based on environmental sensitivity. The UCP's new policy would only protect Category 1 land from coal mining exploration and development. Included in Category 2 which are lands that are "moderately to highly environmentally sensitive" is Mount Livingstone Range. According to Alberta Views, global investors—mainly from Australia—are interested in the region and are following the review process closely.

== Coal mines in Alberta ==
Mining operations in Alberta produce lower and higher ranked coal. High-ranked coals include bituminous coal and the highest rank of coal anthracite or hard coals. Low ranked coals include lignite and sub-bituminous coal. Lignite, which is also referred to as brown coal—is the lowest rank of coal. Lignite, which is the most harmful coal to human health, is almost exclusively used as a fuel for steam-electric power generation.

In Alberta, most of the coal produced is metallurgical coal, which is used for steelmaking, not in electricity generation. Metallurgical coal, which is also referred to as coking coal, is a higher ranking coal used to produce coke. Because it is essential to the steelmaking process, and at present there is no other alternative, metallurgical coal and steel are coupled in the demand chain. Alberta's metallurgical coal is exported to Asian countries—particularly Japan—for steelmaking.

Thermal coal is the solid fuel burned in coal-fired power stations or thermal power stations in electricity generation. Concerns have been raised about air pollution caused by coal-fired power stations.

An October 2022 study by Alberta Environment and Protected Areas' senior scientists said that a remote lake in southern Alberta's mountainous area—Window Mountain Lake—contained mountaintop removal coal mines dust that contaminated the previously pristine lake "to the point where its waters [were] as contaminated as lakes downwind from the oil sands."

Active coal mines in Alberta in 2019
Mine	Coal rank	Location	Owner/operator	Main use	Active?
Cheviot (Cardinal River)	Bituminous	Hinton	Teck Resources Teck Coal Ltd.	Export: metallurgical/steelmaking	The 51-year old mine ceased operations in June 2020.
Coal Valley	Bituminous	Edson	Westmoreland Coal Co.	Export: thermal	Reopened
Dodds	Subbituminous	Ryley	Dodd's Coal Mining Company Ltd.	Small-scale sales	
Genesee	Subbituminous	Warburg	Capital Power LP / Westmoreland Coal Co.	Electricity: Genesee generating stations	In December 2020, Edmonton-based Capital Power announced its shift to coal-free electricity would be sooner than anticipated. It intended to complete its conversion of "Genesee 1 and 2 power plants near Warburg, from coal to fossil gas by 2023".
Grande Cache	Bituminous	Grande Cache	CST Canada Coal Ltd.	Export: metallurgical	The mine was shut down in May 2020 as global demand for coal decreased during Covid-19 pandemic.
Highvale	Subbituminous	Wabamun, Parkland County	Transalta Corp / SunHills Mining LP	Thermal coal Electricity: Keephills and Sundance generating stations	TransAlta Corp. said it would end operations at its Highvale thermal coal mine west of Edmonton by the end of 2021. (Note: TransAlta announced that the Highvale mine would be closing in 2023, which is much earlier than the 2030 provincial deadline. The Highvale mine, which has been in operation since 1970, was the largest surface coal mine in Canada. TransAlta is "switching to natural gas at all of its operated coal-fired plants in Canada".)
Sheerness/ Montgomery	Subbituminous	Hanna	Westmoreland Coal Co.	Electricity: Sheerness generating stations	The mine, which provided over 200 well-paying jobs in Hanna, was set to close by 2030.
Vista	Bituminous	Hinton	Bighorn Mining Ltd.	Export: metallurgical	

=== Vista Coal Project ===
Coalspur Mining Ltd's Vista Coal Project, just east of Hinton, Alberta, and approximately 40 kilometres from the eastern boundary of Jasper National Park, has been described as the largest thermal-coal-for-export project in Canada, and perhaps the largest in North America. According to JWN Energy, the Vista Coal Project has a "surface area of 9,984 hectares" with a potential to provide more than 350 full-time jobs. The Government of Alberta 2020 website lists the $CDN 650-million dollar Vista Coal Project completed in 2019—the "construction of a thermal coal mine and a coal processing plant and drying facility" [for thermal coal that would be] primarily for export to Asia".

Cline Group LLC—the parent company of Kameron Colleries—were the developers for the project. In February 2015, the American billionaire coal investor Chris Cline—who established KC Euroholdings Sarl (KCE)—acquired Coalspur Mines Ltd. "for 2¢ per share". This represented less than 2% of the Coalspur Mines's value in 2020, when it began trading on the Toronto Stock Exchange (TSX).

Although the Energy Resources Conservation Board (ERCB)'s had approved the Vista Coal Project in 1982, when then owner Manalta Coal had submitted their application, and the approval had remained valid, it was stalled for many years. In 2011, the global price of thermal coal had reached a high of US$141 per tonne. But by 2015, it had decreased to US$66. While Bighorn Mining's Vista Coal Mine had received regulatory approval in 2014, construction did not get underway, because the global prices for thermal coal had dropped significantly. In March 2015, Coalspur Mining Ltd spokesman said that the company had struggled to "raise the $445 million in equity needed to build Vista". Coal analysts said in 2015, that with Chris Cline's "better-capitalized ownership" was a "positive development for Vista." The Vista Coal Project, began operations in 2019.

In 2019, Bighorn Mining, an affiliate of Coalspur, began shipping coal to export markets.

Coalspur planned on expanding Vista mines to increase production by about 50%, representing an increase to 18,683 tonnes per day.

In July a draft framework for federal assessment of thermal coal projects says that downstream emissions should be considered as a factor in the assessment of a mining project's environmental impact. Previously, Canadian law and policies considered downstream emissions to be irrelevant, but this changed with the new framework which suggests that Canadian climate obligation extend beyond Canada's border. In July 2020, Jonathan Wilkinson, the federal Minister of Environment and Climate Change, announced that the proposed major expansion of Vista coal mine would be subject to a federal environmental assessment, in response to concerns by the Louis Bull Tribe legal team that the provincial regulators had not consulted with them. Coalspur filed a lawsuit against the department of the environment, the Louis Bull Tribe, the Stoney Nakoda Nation, and others in 2020.

=== Grassy Mountain Coal Project ===
In 2014, Benga Mining Limited (Benga)—now Northback Holdings Corporation—a wholly owned subsidiary of the Australian mining company, Riversdale—began the approval process for the joint federal–provincial environmental review to construct and operate the Grassy Mountain Coal Project. The proposed 2,800-hectare mountain top removal open-pit metallurgical coal mine is located near the Crowsnest Pass, just north of Blairmore, Alberta in the foothills of the Rocky Mountains. It would have a 25-year lifespan and its annual production capacity is estimated at 4.5 million tonnes of coal. Until July 2020, the area was protected as Category 2 land under the 1973 Coal Policy. Hearings begin in October 2020.

Benga Mining, Northback, and Riversdale Resources are subsidiaries of Hancock Prospecting Pty owned by Gina Rinehart, an Australian mining magnate, who is also the wealthiest person in Australia. The three companies are interested in mining Grassy Mountain coal.

In late September 2023, Northback Holdings Corporation, formerly known as Benga Mining Limited, submitted three new applications to the AER for coal exploration and mining at Grassy Mountain, despite having a similar project rejected in 2021. The company is seeking permission to drill 46 boreholes up to 550 meters deep on Crown and private land, with the goal of better understanding the coal deposit and obtaining samples. This renewed attempt at coal development in the Rocky Mountains comes amid ongoing controversy and environmental concerns, with the project facing potential barriers due to increased public awareness and opposition to coal mining in the region. At least three groups, including ranchers and Corb Lund, have requested that the AER postpone hearings on coal exploration in the Rocky Mountains while the province's top court considers the legitimacy of Northback Holdings' applications. The requests stem from concerns that proceeding with hearings would be a waste of time and resources if the Court of Appeal rules against the regulator's decision to exempt Northback from the coal mining ban. The Municipal District of Ranchland, which initiated the appeal, argues that the regulator wrongly exempted Northback, and if successful, the appeal would render the hearings moot.

== Royalties ==
The royalty rate for coal produced from Crown-owned bituminous (mountain/foothills) coal leases, as defined under Alberta's Mines and Minerals Act's Coal Royalty Regulation—"based on a revenue minus costs royalty regime"—is one per cent of mine mouth revenue (MMR) before mine payout and 1% of MMR plus 13% of net revenue after mine payout."

Coal royalty rates in Alberta are comparable to those in British Columbia but "significantly lower" than coal royalties in Queensland, Australia. Australia, which is the leading exporter of metallurgical coal in the world, the royalty rate in Queensland is progressive, increasing as the price of coal increases. If coal is $100 or less, the royalty rate is 7%.

According to the Coal and Mineral Development in Alberta Year in Review, "between 2015 and 2019, Alberta's bituminous mining companies collectively paid royalties ranging from $5.1 million to $11.3 million." According to Alberta's provincial government website, the provincial government collected "$15.7 million in royalties from coal" in 2017. This did not "include freehold production of coal".

Bituminous coal production
Year October 1-September 30	Production (t)	Royalty
2010	7,808,400	$20,628,221
2011	6,898,123	$12,325,969
2012	6,805,148	$8,892,626
2013	6,653,820	$5,775,640
2014	6,915,435	$5,826,830
2015	4,066,285	$4,139,311
2016	4,060,223	$11,372,650
2017	3,474,228	$11,285,563
2018	3,181,867	$5,118,232
2019	5,164,316	$6,394,399

Subbituminous coal production
Year October 1-September 30	Production	Crown*	Royalty
2010	23,583,193	43%	$5,604,637
2011	24,938,975	59%	$8,124,111
2012	22,483,777	60%	$7,463,258
2013	22,288,559	59%	$7,209,349
2014	24,230,326	70%	$9,314,753
2015	23,613,875	72%	$9,324,471
2016	21,422,954	68%	$8,061,524
2017	22,303,049	60%	$7,331,674
2018	16,452,990	61%	$5,508,152
2019	12,647,038	46%	$3,218,416

- "The percentages are the portion of the production from Crown coal rights. Alberta Energy does not collect royalty on freehold coal production."

== Coal leases ==
The province of Alberta leases land for to a lease holder for the exclusive right mine coal for a minimum period of 15 years—leases are renewable. Since 2006, there have been "17 public offering of crown coal rights made". Surface mining on the eastern slopes had been protected by a decades old coal policy that the UCP administration under Premier Kenney had rescinded in May, 2020. In May 2020, 8 leases were made to a single company.

In early December 2020 Alberta Energy said that bids were closing on "nearly 2,000 hectares on the eastern slopes of the Rocky Mountains" that had been made available for coal leases in May. New 2020 leases combined with existing leases represents "an almost unbroken swath for nearly 60 kilometres north from the Crowsnest Pass in Alberta's southwest corner". Not all leases result in productive mines.

== Regulatory systems for coal ==
In Alberta, the Crown owns 81% of the mineral rights. The rest are owned by individuals, companies or the federal government on behalf of First Nations. The provincial Ministry of Energy—Alberta Energy—oversees mining regulations which includes environmental protection. The Alberta Energy Regulator (AER) has been the "single regulator of energy development" since 2014. Alberta Energy also "issues and administers coal leases on Crown lands and collects royalties from producing mines."

The Canadian federal government sets national standards on emissions that affect the coal industry. The 2015 Reduction of Carbon Dioxide Emissions from Coal-Fired Generation of Electricity Regulations under the Canadian Environmental Protection Act, 1999 placed a "limit of 420 tonnes of CO2 for each gigawatt-hour of electricity produced from coal per year" with a compliance deadline of 2030. The 2018 performance standard set out in the Regulations Amending the Reduction of Carbon Dioxide Emissions from Coal-fired Generation of Electricity Regulations was "designed to phase out conventional coal by 2030."

== Environmental concerns ==
=== Selenium poisoning watersheds ===
Critics, which include well-known country singers Corb Lund and Paul Brandt, and local ranchers—including John Smith and Laura Laing, who also began a "Save Our Mountains" campaign—are concerned about the June 2020 rescinding of the 1976 Coal Policy, in part because of the threat to watersheds by selenium poisoning. They cite the case of the Elk River in British Columbia where watersheds downstream of coal mines have been poisoned by the highly toxic selenium released in the process of open pit coal-mining. In 2020, the United States Environmental Protection Agency (EPA) reproached British Columbia for allowing Tech Industries to "exceed guidelines" for selenium. Recent research had revealed selenium contaminants in a river in the United States. In 1998, the Elk Valley Selenium Task Force (EVSTF), and then the Selenium Technical Advisory Committee (STAC) was established in 1998, to respond to concerns about selenium concentration in the Elk River and its tributary—the Fording River with its Fording River coal mine—in Southeast British Columbia. Their reports found that there had been an increase in selenium concentration since the 1990s, when "large-scale, open pit surface" mines became the "dominant" coal extraction technique, leading to the production of coal mining waste rock that seeped into the watershed downstream. By 2014, the Elk River watershed had reached a tipping point in terms of toxic selenium concentrations. The EVSTF and the STAC found that the concentrations of dissolved selenium emissions had a "deleterious" effect on fish populations, such as the westslope cutthroat trout. When the concentration of selenium reaches a toxic threshold it can cause "reproductive failure", potentially resulting in a "total population collapse". By 2020, waterways downstream of B.C.'s open pit coal mines reported "levels up to four times B.C.'s maximum for drinking water" while near the mines, the levels were "50 times" the recommended level for "aquatic health".

== See also ==
- Coalspur Formation
- Coal in Canada
- Coal mining in Saskatchewan
- Western Canadian Sedimentary Basin
