= Teck Cominco smelter =

Smelter in Trail, British Columbia

Coordinates: 49°06′00″N 117°42′45″W

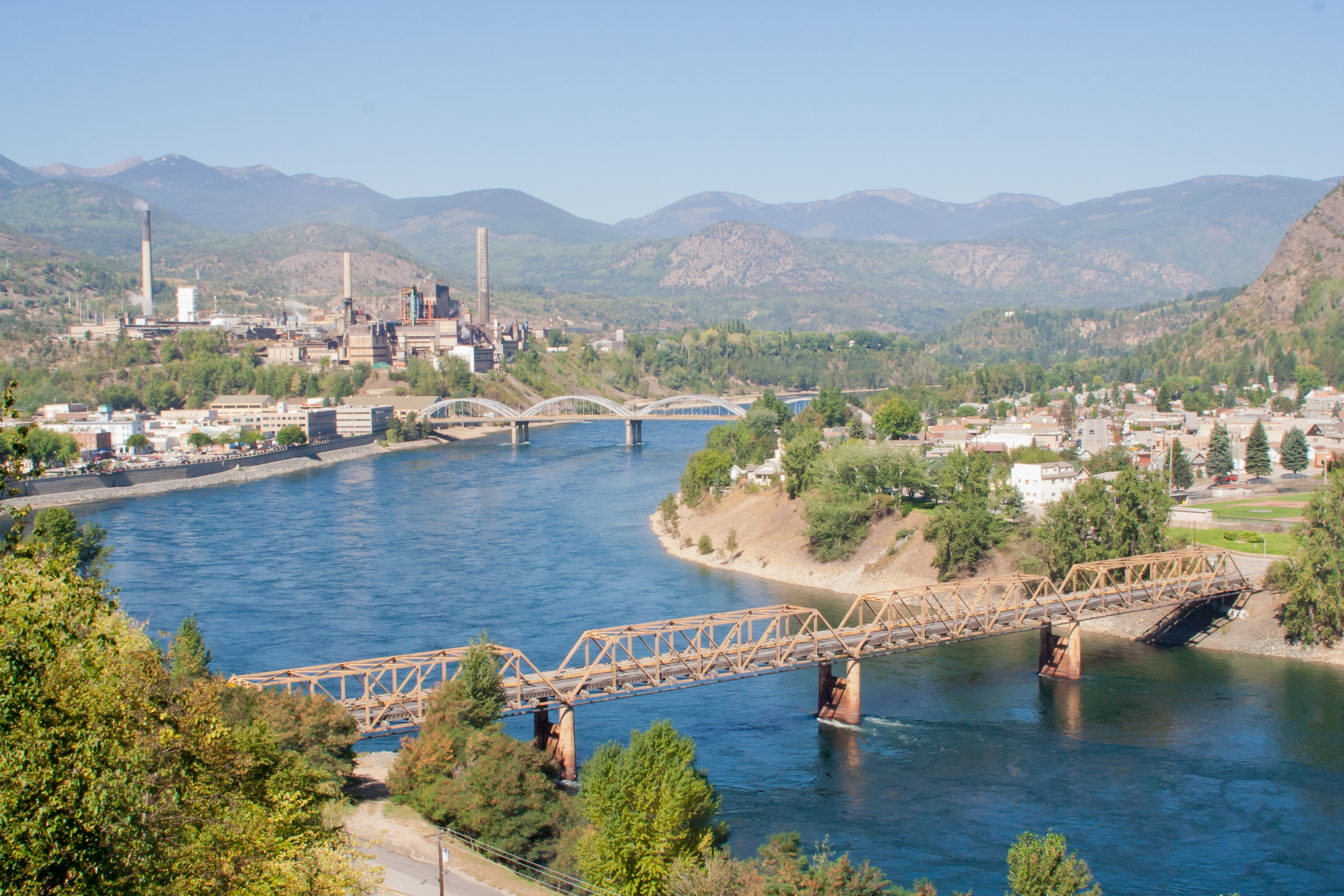
Teck Cominco smelter

The Teck Cominco smelter, also known as the Teck Cominco Lead-Zinc Smelter, Cominco Smelter, and Trail smelter located in Trail, British Columbia, Canada, is the largest integrated lead-zinc smelter of its kind in the world. It is situated approximately 10 miles (16 km) north of the border between British Columbia, Canada and Washington, in the United States, on the Columbia River. It is owned and operated by Vancouver, British Columbia-based Teck Cominco Metals Ltd—renamed Teck Resources.

Since 1896, there has been a copper and gold smelting operation in the area. The original company, Consolidated Mining and Smelting Company of Canada, was founded in 1906 through a merger of several entities then under the control of the Canadian Pacific Railway (CPR). In July 2001, Cominco and Teck Resources merged and in 2008, Teck Cominco renamed itself as Teck. By 2018, the Teck Cominco smelter complex had been in operation for over a century. It provided 1,400 jobs in 2018, making it the largest employer in the small city of Trail, with a population of 7800. In 2017, the smelter produced more than 230,000 tons of zinc, which is used in rustproofing both iron and steel. Teck reported that they had invested CA$525 million in the late 2010s to "improve efficiency and performance at its Trail Operations" and that they intend to invest an added CA$150 million. The Trail Operations contributed CA$169 million to Teck Resources CA$3.3-billion gross profit in 2017.

== Overview ==
The original Trail smelter for the nearby Rossland mines, was founded by the American mining engineer F. Augustus Heinze (1869 – 1914) who had already built a smelter in Butte, Montana. In 1896, Heinze initially incorporated his smelting and mining company in the United States and then in Canada. Within a period of 4 years, Heinze owned the "smelter, mining interests, railway lines, railway charters, and associated land grants." Walter Hull Aldridge (b. 1867), an American mining and metallurgical engineer, took a position with the president of the Canadian Pacific Railway (CPR), Sir William Van Horne, to negotiate a deal with Heinze. Under Aldridge's direction, the CPR's mining interests were incorporated under the name of the Consolidated Mining & Smelting Company, then known as the Consolidated or CM&S. At that time, Consolidated "controlled many of British Columbia's largest lead, silver, gold and copper mines, as well as the large reduction works at Trail."

In 1910, CM&S anticipated the decline of its Rossland mines and purchased the lead-zinc ore-rich Sullivan Mine. At that time, it was difficult to smelt ore from the Sullivan mine because of the presence of iron sulphide. A metallurgist from Ontario, Randolphe 'Ralph' William Diamond who was hired by Consolidated, developed the process known as differential flotation that separated minerals by letting them "float" by "sticking to bubbles formed in certain mixtures of chemicals and oils". This ground-breaking technology increased production at the Sullivan Mine making it profitable for decades. It required a "long-term stable workforce" not just itinerant workers; mining towns grew around the mines and smelter. While 1924, was a peak year in terms of production, by 1927, sulphur dioxide (SO2) emissions from the smelter had contaminated the vegetation and the land of the Columbia River valley in Washington State. Damages were estimated at $350,000 by the International Joint Commission in 1927.

In 1934, Cominco had initiated heavy water research at the smelter but it did not gain momentum until the outbreak of World War II. During the war, the Allies cooperated in researching nuclear fission with the goal of developing an atomic bomb. New research had revealed that heavy water could slow down the uranium neutron, making a chain reaction possible. Under the tenure of Selwyn G. Blaylock as Cominco's president, (Note: Blaylock worked at Cominco from 1908 until 1945, working his way through various management positions.) the smelter was upgraded as part of the Manhattan Project's heavy water production program, under code name the P-9 Project. Princeton University physicist Hugh S. Taylor, who was in charge of United States Office of Scientific Research and Development (OSRD) research on heavy water research, gave Cominco $20,000 towards the upgrade modifications. Cominco produced heavy water for the United States from 1942 until 1956.

In the 1950s, a hydroelectric dam—the Waneta Dam—was built south of Trail on the Pend D’Oreille River, which provided inexpensive electricity to the smelter.

For decades the smelter provided well-paying employment for people who had only a high school education. Intergenerational families worked at the smelter and the company became Trail's "economic and cultural centre."

In the spring of 2017, Teck Resources announced that they were considering a CA$1.2-billion deal to sell its Waneta Dam to BC Hydro. At the time, union members who work at the Teck were concerned about the smelter's future. Teck had expanded its operations worldwide and the Trail operations only contributed CA$92 million of Teck's CA$3.3-billion gross profit in 2017.

== See also ==
- Teck Resources
- Trail Smelter dispute
