= Norman B. Keevil Jr. =

Canadian geologist (born 1938)

- Born: 28 February 1938 (age 88); Cambridge, Massachusetts
- Education: University of Toronto (BASc '59); University of California, Berkeley (MSc '61, PhD '64)
- Spouse(s): Nancy J. Brown (m. 1957) Catherine Elizabeth Taylor (m. 1969) Joan E. Macdonald (m. 1990)

Norman Bell Keevil Jr. (born 28 February 1938) is a Canadian geologist who served from 1981 to 2000 as president and from 2000 to 2018 as chairman of Teck Resources, and from 1986 to 2001 as chairman of Cominco. Keevil is the controlling shareholder of Teck, and as such, one of the most powerful figures in Canadian mining.

== Biography ==
Norman Bell Keevil Jr. was born on 28 February 1938 in Cambridge, Massachusetts to Norman Bell Keevil Sr. (1910–1989) and Ruth Verna Bond (1914–2002). At the time of his birth, his father was a doctoral student at Harvard, while his mother was working in a chemistry laboratory at the university. Norman Sr. was born in Pike Lake, Saskatchewan in 1910 and was the son of Roland Keevil. Roland had come to Canada from England in 1905 and was the brother of Sir Norman Keevil, who was chairman of the family business, Keevil and Keevil, one of the oldest butchers in England. The Keevil family traced its origins to the Norman Conquest and was named deKevilly originally. Ruth, a descendant of Mayflower passenger William Brewster, was a 1936 graduate of Radcliffe College, the sister school to Harvard. Ruth and Norman Sr. met at Harvard, were married, and had Norman while living in Massachusetts.

Shortly after Norman Jr.'s birth, the Keevils moved to Toronto where Norman Sr. took a position at the University of Toronto as a professor of geophysics. Norman Sr. and Verna would have four more children: Harold, Brian, June, and Susan. Norman Jr. grew up in Toronto and graduated from Streetsville High School. In the fall of 1956 he entered the University of Toronto, where he graduated Bachelor of Applied Science in geology in 1959. Upon graduation, he entered the University of California, Berkeley, where he studied under Dr. Stanley H. Ward. Keevil graduated Master of Science in 1961 and received his doctorate in 1964.

In 1981, Keevil succeeded his father as president of Teck Corporation. On 1 June 2000, Steven G. Dean succeeded Keevil as president, while Keevil was elected chairman of the board. In July 2018, Keevil that he would retire, effective 1 October. His successor as chairman would be Dominic Barton, who joined the board on 1 September.

Keevil has been married three times. In 1957, he married Nancy J. Brown. The couple had four children: Scott, Laura, Jill, and Norman III. On 10 July 1969, Keevil married Catherine Elizabeth Taylor (1945–2012). They divorced in the late 1980s. In December 1990, Keevil remarried to Joan E. MacDonald.

== Works ==
- Fraser, D. C., Norman B. Keevil Jr., and Stanley H. Ward. "Conductivity Spectra of Rocks from the Craigmont Ore Environment." Geophysics vol. 25 no. 5 (1964): 663-872.
- Keevil, Norman B. Jr. Exploration at the Craigmont Mine, British Columbia. Dissertation. University of California, Berkeley, 1965.
- Keevil, Norman B. Jr. Never Rest on Your Ores: Building a Mining Company, One Stone at a Time. McGill-Queen's University Press, 2017.
- Keevil, Norman B. Jr. and Stanley H. Ward. "Electrolyte Activity: Its Effect on Induced Polarization." Geophysics vol. 27 no. 5 (1962): 569-724.
