= Trail Smelter dispute =

Canadian-American pollution dispute

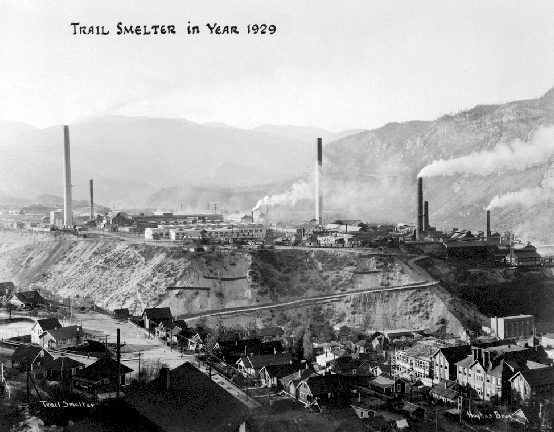
Trail Smelter in 1929

The Trail Smelter dispute was a trans-boundary pollution case involving the federal governments of both Canada and the United States, which eventually contributed to establishing the harm principle in the environmental law of transboundary pollution.

The smelter in Trail, British Columbia was historically operated by the Consolidated Mining and Smelting Company (COMINCO) until COMINCO merged with Teck in 2001, and has processed lead and zinc since 1896. Smoke from the smelter caused damage to forests and crops in the surrounding area and also across the Canada–US border in Washington. The smoke from the smelter distressed residents, resulting in complaints to COMINCO and demands for compensation. The dispute between the smelter operators and affected landowners could not be resolved, resulting in the case being sent to an arbitration tribunal. Negotiation and resulting litigation and arbitration was settled in 1941.

== Historical context ==
The Trail Smelter is located in Trail, British Columbia in the south-western corner of the Kootenays, which is known as a mineral-rich area. The smelter was initially built by American mining engineer and magnate F. Augustus Heinze in 1895 to treat lead and zinc ore materials from nearby mines. Prior to building the smelter, agents for Heinze signed a contract guaranteeing 75,000 tons of ore would be provided by Rossland's LeRoi Mining Company. The smelter and the freight railway to the Rossland mines were bought by the Canadian Pacific Railway (CPR) for $1 million in 1898 (equivalent to $32.1 million in 2024), when tracks were being laid into the town and during the construction of a competing smelter in nearby Northport, Washington State. The Trail Smelter became a factor in the Canadian government's efforts to establish a smelting industry in Canada, which had sent ores to American smelters for processing in the past. The Trail Smelter operation grew, adding other local mines to the portfolio, and were incorporated as the Consolidated Mining and Smelting Company of Canada (Cominco) in 1905, with continuing support from the CPR. When completed in 1895, the smelter could process 250 tons of ore daily and had smokestacks 150 feet high to help disperse the fumes. During the arbitration that followed the dispute, the tribunal commented that by 1906 Trail had 'one of the best and largest equipped smelting plants on this continent.'" By 1916 the Trail Smelter was producing monthly outputs of 4,700 tons of sulphur, but with post World War I expansion and technological improvements to the smelting process, the company doubled the smelter's output throughout the 1920s and was producing 10,000 tons monthly by 1930.

Most of Trail's male residents worked for the smelter and local businesses and farmers relied on the income from smelter employee salaries. Smoke from the smelter was seen by many residents as a sign of prosperity and continued employment; local residents commented that the "thicker the smoke ascending from Smelter Hill the greater Trail's prosperity." On the other hand, local farmers complained about the effects of the toxic smoke on their crops, which eventually led to arbitration with Cominco between 1917 and 1924, and resulted to the assessment $600,000 in fines being levied against the defendant. The fines were to serve as compensation for smoke damage to crops and included Cominco buying four complete farms (out of sixty farms involved) closest to the stacks. No government regulations of the smelter's output were imposed on Cominco following the 1924 decision.

As a direct consequence of the local dispute and arbitration, Cominco looked for ways to reduce the smelter's smoke output while increasing the smelter's production. The initial solution involved increasing the height of the smokestacks to 409 feet in 1926 in an effort to disperse the smelter's smoke by pushing it higher into the atmosphere, but this local solution proved to be a problem for their Washington neighbours.

== Dispute details ==
=== Major players ===
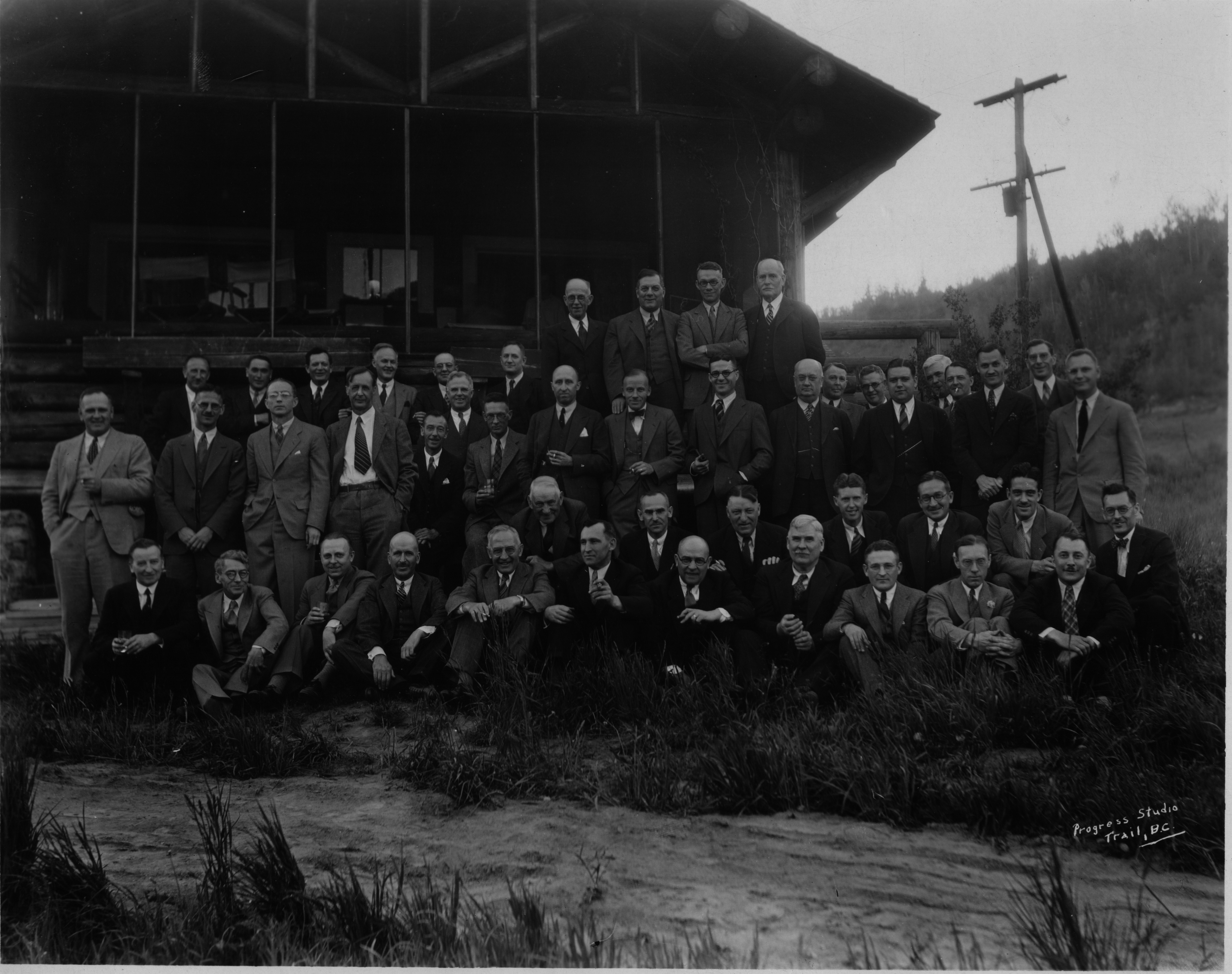
Smelter management, 1928

The major players of the Trail Smelter dispute were the owners of the smelter, the Consolidated Mining and Smelting Company of Canada (Cominco), and the American residents (mostly farmers and landowners who were affected by the smoke generated from the smelter). The farmers and landowners in Washington who had a mutual concern for the smoke drifting from the smelter, formed the Citizens' Protective Association (CPA) when their direct complaints to Cominco were not addressed. Initially the regional governments became involved, both the province of British Columbia and Washington State, but eventually the two federal governments took leadership roles in the dispute because of the issue of national boundaries and extraterritoriality. Both governments were initially involved in the foundation of the International Joint Commission (IJC) in 1909, which was later responsible for investigating and then recommending a settlement for the alleged damages in the Trail case. The transformation of the smelter dispute into a foreign policy issue resulted in more institutions joining the dispute. This included the Canada's National Research Council (NRC) and the American Smelting and Refining Company, which each contributed scientific experts to assess the damages from the smelter's smoke.

=== Alleged damages ===
A growing concern in 1925 was the smoke drifting from the smelter across the border into Washington, allegedly causing damages to crops and forests. The smoke generated from the smelter became the source of complaints from American residents. Complaints included: sulphur dioxide gases in the form of some smoke generated from the smelter was directed into the Columbia River Valley by prevailing winds, scorching crops and accelerating forest loss. Effects of the smoke, as investigated by the US Department of Agriculture, included both "visible damage" in terms of "burned leaves and declining soil productivity" and "invisible damage" which consisted of "stunted growth and lower food value" for the crops.

=== Initial efforts to resolve ===
After the complaints in 1925 regarding crop and forest destruction as a result of smoke from the smelter, Cominco accepted responsibility and offered to compensate the farmers who were affected. Cominco also proposed installing fume-controlling technologies to limit future damage and reduce the emissions of sulphur dioxide. The company had initially raised smokestacks to four hundred feet in an effort to increase the dispersion of pollutants; however, this had resulted in prevailing winds moving the noxious fumes downwind to the inhabitants of the Columbia River Valley, thereby making the situation worse. The company also tried to offer payments to the affected residents or even offered to purchase the land outright, which some would have accepted. However, the company was denied this method of compensation because of Washington State's prohibition of property ownership by foreigners. This led to the official petition by the farmers and landowners of Washington in 1927 for state and federal support against the smelter, claiming the smoke was damaging United States lands. In 1931, the IJC awarded the farmers $350,000 in damages, but did not set guidelines for sulphur dioxide emission reduction. The compensation was far less than the plaintiffs had expected and the IJC settlement was eventually rejected under the pressure of Washington State's congressional delegation. The unsatisfactory result of the IJC decision led to the establishment of a three-person arbitral tribunal to resolve the dispute in 1935.

== Arbitration details ==
The arbitration case was originally between the farmers in the affected area and Cominco; however, what started off as the smelter versus agriculturalists evolved when regional and federal agents became involved, resulting in the dispute becoming an international issue.

Both sides employed a variety of experts to represent their interests, including scientists and private or public enterprises. The United States used the U.S. State Department along with scientists from the Department of Agriculture to conduct investigations about the effects of the smelter's output on agriculture in the region. The Canadian side turned to Canada's National Research Council (NRC) and was granted access to the Salt Lake Research Station to conduct research for the smelter's defence. These experts would remain active actors throughout the dispute. The decision laid down by the IJC awarded the farmers $350,000 in 1931 for the damages incurred by the Trail Smelter; this was much less than the farmers had sought. Additionally, this was the first time the IJC ruled on a trans-boundary air pollution case. The U.S. State Department flatly rejected the decision and submitted for arbitration. This resulted in diplomatic maneuvering which led to an arbitral tribunal; it was the tribunal's decision that produced the most significant results in the dispute. As part of the agreements leading up to the arbitral tribunal, the United States agreed to accept the initial compensation awarded by the IJC from Canada as compensation for damages done by the smelter prior to 1932.

=== Tribunal ===
It was not until 1935 that a convention was signed in Ottawa, Ontario, Canada that legitimized the tribunal. The convention outlined 11 Articles under which the Tribunal would operate. Of the eleven articles, article 3 outlines the four questions the tribunal was to answer:

1. Whether damage caused by the Trail Smelter in the State of Washington has occurred since the first day of January, 1932, and, if so, what indemnity should be paid?
2. In the event of the answer to the first part of the preceding question being is positive, to what extent should there be compensation?
3. In light of the answer to the preceding question, what measures or regime, if any, should be adopted or maintained by the Trail Smelter?
4. What indemnity or compensation, if any, should be paid because of any decision or decisions rendered by the tribunal pursuant to the next two preceding questions?

The American lawyers’ argument can be summarized as trying to prove that “invisible injury” occurred in the region. Large sums of money rested on the results of this case as the decision would affect various other smelting projects across North America; as such, the lawyers representing Cominco successfully limited the definition of damage to the actual, observable, economic damage. Lawyers on both sides were well practiced with substantial experience. R.C. “Judge” Crowe, VP of Cominco and a Montreal corporate lawyer, and John E. Read represented Cominco. The U.S. hired Jacob G. Metzger, a State Department attorney with experience in negotiating international claims. Metzger had a habit of not writing his arguments down, and when he died in 1937 the American scientists and lawyers went into the hearing unprepared.

The United States had conducted experiments that suggested sulphur soaked into the soil; however, the findings had limited standing in the arbitration because the data was from the early 1930s before the smelter implemented chemical recovery methods. On the other hand, the Canadians had the resources and the smelting industry supporting them. The experimental data the American lawyers presented to the tribunal did not convince the arbitrators of “invisible injury” theory.

Because of the Canadian lawyers' success in narrowing the definition to the actual, observable, economic damage, the arbitrators awarded $78,000 in damages for two burns causing visible damage in 1934 and 1936. The final settlement for damages was awarded in April 1938 and was considered a victory for Cominco. When weighed against the backbone of the Trail economy, as well as the smelter's contributions to the war effort, the economic contributions of small-scale farmers in a less fertile agricultural area were minimal.

== Reparations ==
The consequences of the arbitration came in two parts; one being economic compensation for the local farmers of Stevens County, Washington and two effecting laws for transboundary air pollution issues. Transboundary issues meaning those that stretch between states and nations.

Cominco initially agreed to pay $350,000 in compensation to the local farmers for all damages before January 1, 1932.

However, this offer was rejected by the local residents and farmers, and the Washington government thus resulting in the arbitration. The arbiters final decisions were based on evidence for visible injury to the farmers' livelihood, the US' case was poorly presented thus the tribunal's final decision in 1941 granted an additional $78,000 to the farmers and also imposed Cominco's duty of regulating the smoke output.

The arbitration successfully imposed state responsibility for transnational air pollution. This set precedence for no states being able to use their territories in such a way that would cause harm by air pollution to another territory. It was Cominco's responsibility to regulate and control the pollution their smelting industries created. As a result, the state enforced regulatory rules on corporations to limit damaging emissions.

For Cominco, their company being subject to emission standards meant potentially limiting the output of their smelter. For the better part of twenty years, the company fought every attempt to impose any sort of regulatory regime aimed at production levels. Only after they learned that they could recycle sulfur dioxide to make fertilizer did they finally consent to emission standards.

The arbitration was significant because it defined the limits of environmentally permissible conduct between international boundaries: nations must not perpetrate significant harm to other nations through pollution.

== Precedents and long-term legacies ==
=== Transboundary international law precedents ===
Prior to the decision made by the arbitral tribunal on Trail, disputes over air pollution between two countries had never been settled through arbitration, and the polluter pays principle had never been applied in an international context. When the tribunal dealt with the details of the Trail Smelter arbitration, there was no existing international law that dealt with air pollution; therefore, a law dealing with international air pollution was modelled after U.S. state laws, with the tribunal referring to a number of cases in the U.S. that involved air pollution between multiple states.

During the tribunal's decision-making, there was also confusion between defining 'damage' versus 'damages' when it came time to decide on an outcome; the tribunal took 'damage' to mean 'damages' as in the monetary value lost by smoke pollution instead of as direct damage to the land. Because of this, Canada's responsibility for the conduct of the smelter became making sure that the smelter did not cause any more smoke 'damage' to U.S. soil. The American inter-state law precedent caused a stir again in 2003 when the Colville Confederated Tribes launched a complaint against Cominco for polluting Lake Roosevelt. Douglas Horswill, Senior Vice President for Teck Resources, stated that "in the U.S. legal process...Teck COMINCO would not be able to use the fact that it was operating with valid permits in its defence [because it is a Canadian company], whereas a U.S. company could"; Horswill's media statement reflects the tensions created by formulating an international law based on American inter-state practices.

When the International Law Commission (ILC) "adopted a series of Draft Articles on Prevention of Transboundary Harm from Hazardous Activities", a fundamental problem was in defining nations as states, which was the result of applying the existing U.S. model of inter-state environmental laws to an international conflict. The draft articles contained a collection of provisions that focused on six points:

- prevention of transboundary harm,
- cooperation to prevent significant harm and reduce risk,
- the exercise of regulatory control by states of activities on their territory through prior authorizations,
- environmental impact assessment,
- notification, and
- consultation

Since polluting nations were to be held responsible for harms caused to another nation's environment, this was not applicable in the arbitration because the players involved were sub-groups of each nation's population and the populus that was most affected were not the sovereign states but the sub-groups. Although Canada accepted responsibility for the actions of the smelting plant, conflict resolution put the onus on Canada to compensate for Cominco's past pollution rather than forcing Cominco to prevent future harm to U.S. soil. The legacy of this decision includes the eventual creation of regulatory regimes to prevent environmental degradation, which allow nations to put states in charge of taking positive steps to control pollution. The failure by states to meet these responsibilities means they are breaching international law.

Some scholars do not see the case as setting a precedent because the unique circumstances surrounding the Trail Smelter have been articulated and discussed multiple times, therefore the arguments that arise for transboundary international law are divorced from the context they are derived from; this distorts the decisions made in cases like the Trail arbitration. For the arbitration, the decisions that appear to be the focus of literature on transboundary international law precedents are sub-articles 2 and 4 from Article 3 of the International Joint Commission's (IJC) recommendations.

== See also ==
- Franklin D. Roosevelt Lake

== Bibliography ==
- Bratspies, Rebecca M.; Miller, Russell A., eds. (2010). Transboundary Harm in International Law: Lessons from the Trail Smelter Arbitration. Cambridge: Cambridge University Press.
- Ellis, Jaye (2010). Bratspies, Rebecca M.; Miller, Russell A. (eds.). "Has International Law Outgrown Trail Smelter?". Transboundary Harm in International Law: Lessons from the Trail Smelter Arbitration: 56–65.
- Geranios, Nicholas (July 22, 2004). "Colvilles sue Teck Cominco over pollution". Associated Press Newswires.
- Kaijser, Arne (2011). "The Trail from Trail: New Challenges for Historians of Technology". Presidential Address for the Society for the History of Technology: 131–142.
- Mickelson, Karin (1993). "Notes and Comments: Rereading Trail Smelter". Canadian Yearbook of International Law. 31: 219–234. doi:10.1017/S0069005800005464. S2CID 158815628.
- Rubin, Alfred (2010). Bratspies, Rebecca M.; Miller, Russell A. (eds.). "Pollution by Analogy: The Trail Smelter Arbitration [Abridged]". Transboundary Harm in International Law: Lessons from the Trail Smelter Arbitration: 46–55.
- Stueck, Wendy (August 27, 2004). "Teck Cominco asks U.S. court to dismiss lawsuit". The Globe and Mail. p. B4.
