= William Lawrence Saunders Gold Medal =

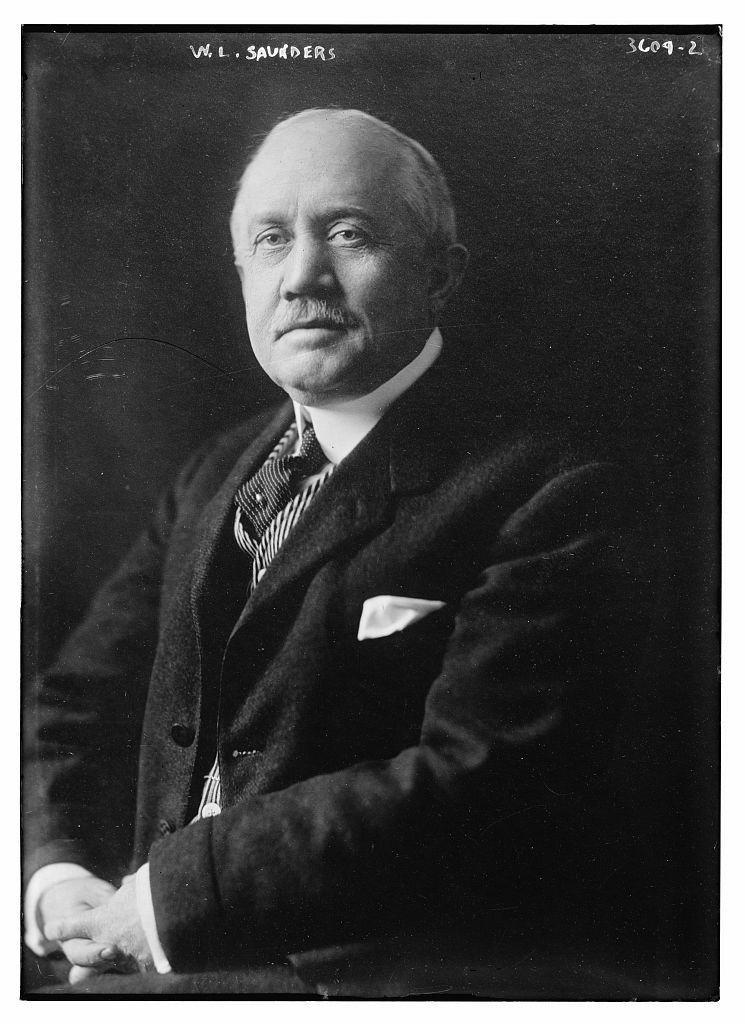
William Lawrence Saunders endowed the medal

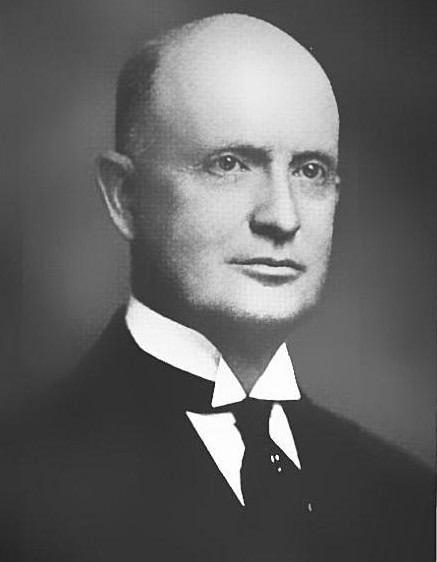
Erskine Ramsay (1937)

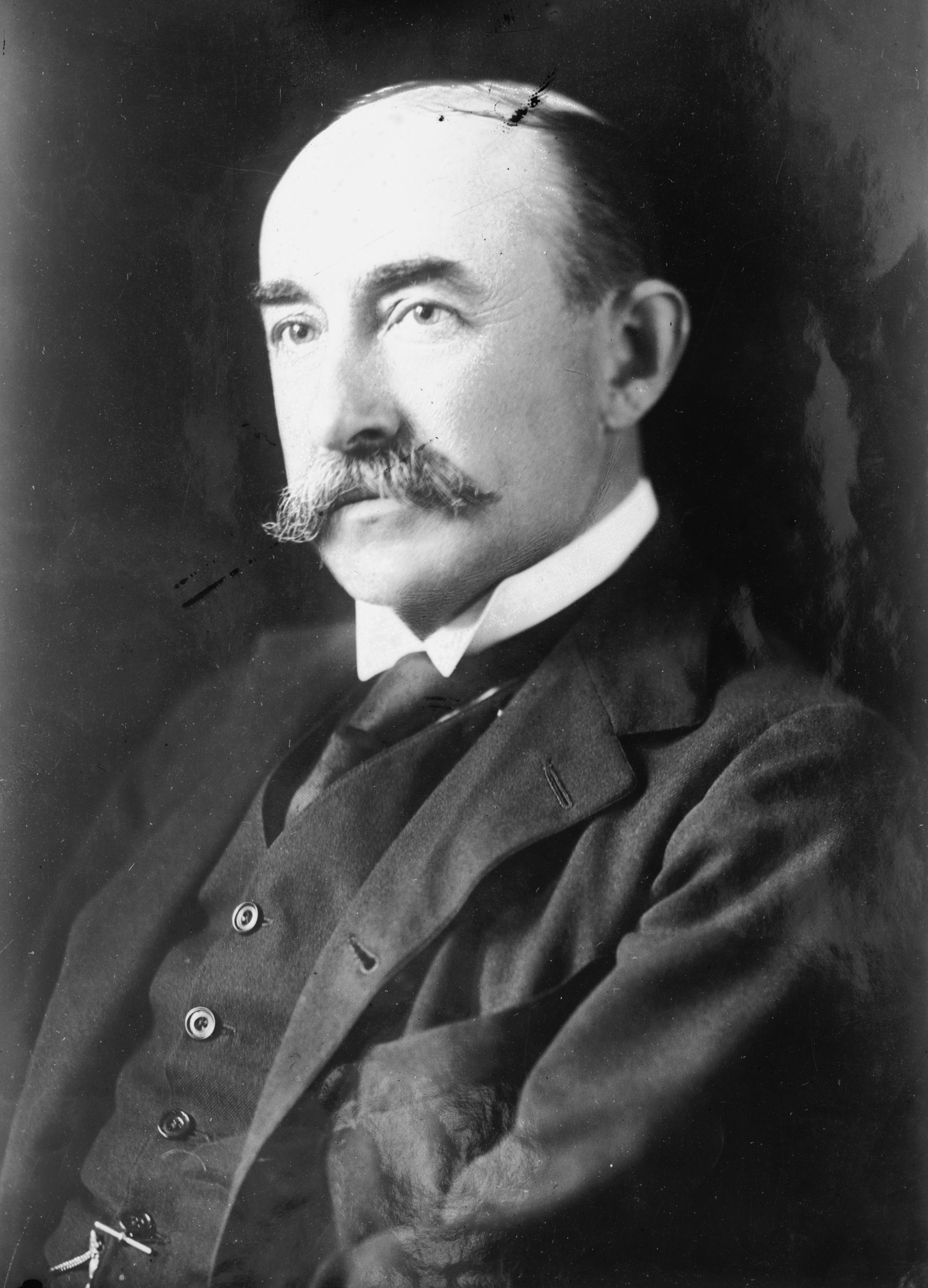
John Hays Hammond (1929)

The William Lawrence Saunders Gold Medal was first awarded in 1927 and recognizes "distinguished achievement in mining other than coal". The award is funded by the American Institute of Mining, Metallurgical, and Petroleum Engineers and named for William Lawrence Saunders.

== Winners ==
- 2022 - Joseph Dick
- 2019 - Timothy D. Arnold
- 2018 - John D. Wiebmer
- 2017 - Phillips S. Baker, Jr.
- 2016 - Ronald L. Parratt
- 2015 - William M. Zisch
- 2014 - Timothy J. Haddon
- 2013 - Ronald Thiessen
- 2012 - Ron Guill
- 2011 - Harry F. Cougher
- 2010 - Douglas B. Silver
- 2009 - Patrick J. Ryan (engineer)
- 2008 - Stanley Dempsey
- 2006 - James L. Madson
- 2005 - F. Steven Mooney
- 2004 - Paul C. Jones (engineer)
- 2003 - Thomas J. O'Neil
- 2002 - Robert W. Schafer
- 2001 - Richard T. Moolick
- 2000 - Robert N. Hickman
- 1998 - Donald Vester Fites (born 1934)
- 1997 - Hugo T. Dummett
- 1996 - Leonard Harris (engineer)
- 1995 - J. Burgess Winter
- 1994 - T. Peter Philip
- 1993 - Kenneth J. Barr
- 1992 - Philip C. Walsh
- 1991 - G. Frank Joklik
- 1990 - Milton H. Ward
- 1989 - Richard J. Stoehr
- 1988 - Roy Woodall
- 1987 - Charles L. Pillar
- 1986 - Richard L. Brittain
- 1984 - John C. Kinnear, Jr.
- 1983 - Sir Frank Espie
- 1982 - John Towers (engineer)
- 1980 - James S. Westwater
- 1979 - Henry Thomas Mudd (1913-1990)
- 1978 - Russell H. Bennett
- 1977 - Frank Coolbaugh
- 1975 - Charles Dixon Clarke
- 1974 - H. Myles Jacob
- 1972 - Stanley M. Jarrett
- 1970 - Elmer A. Jones
- 1968 - Charles M. Brinckerhoff
- 1967 - Ralph Douglas Parker
- 1966 - Wesley P. Goss
- 1965 - Francis Cameron (engineer)
- 1964 - Walter C. Lawson (engineer)
- 1963 - Edward Ignatius Renouard
- 1962 - Joseph Hugh Reid
- 1961 - Marcus David Banghart
- 1960 - Robert J. Linney
- 1959 - John Ballantine Knaebel
- 1958 - William Jesse Coulter
- 1956 - Louis Buchman
- 1954 - Simeon Stansifer Clarke
- 1951 - Clyde Evarts Weed
- 1950 - Howard Nicholas Eavenson
- 1949 - Stanly Alexander Easton
- 1947 - LeRoy Salsich
- 1946 - Fred Searls, Jr.
- 1944 - George Bates Harrington
- 1941 - Herman C. Bellinger
- 1939 - Louis S. Cates (18811959)
- 1937 - Erskine Ramsay (1864-1953)
- 1936 - Clinton H. Crane
- 1935 - James MacNaughton (engineer)
- 1934 - Pope Yeatman
- 1933 - Walter Hull Aldridge
- 1932 - Frederick Worthen Bradley
- 1930 - Daniel Cowan Jackling (1869–1956)
- 1929 - John Hays Hammond (1855–1936)
- 1928 - Herbert Hoover (1874–1964)
- 1927 - David William Brunton

== See also ==
- List of engineering awards
