= Coal Mountain Mine =

Coal mine in British Columbia, Canada

- Location in Canada

Location
- Location: Corbin, British Columbia, Canada; 49°30′37″N 114°39′16″W

Production
- Products: Coking coal
- Production: 2.5 million tonnes coal

History
- Discovered: 1905
- Closed: 2018

Owner
- Company: Teck Resources

The Coal Mountain Mine is a coal mine located in British Columbia. During operation, the mine has produced 2.5 million tonnes of coal per year. Teck Resources which runs operation on site, put the mine on care and maintenance status in 2018. Operations at the mine were interrupted by fire in 1913, and halted in 1935 by a strike and riot at the site. Coal from the mine was trucked to the Trail smelter during the Second world war in order to help the Allied steelmaking effort.
