= Teck Resources =

Canadian mining company

Teck Resources Limited
- Formerly: Teck-Hughes Gold Mines (1913–1964); Teck Corporation (1964–2001); Teck Cominco (2001–2009)
- Type: Public
- Traded as: NYSE: TECK; TSX: TECK.A, TECK.B; S&P/TSX 60 component
- Industry: Metals and Mining
- Founded: 8 April 1913
- Headquarters: Vancouver, British Columbia, Canada
- Key people: Sheila A. Murray, Board Chair; Jonathan H. Price, CEO; Shehzad Bharmal, EVP and COO
- Products: Copper, Zinc
- Revenue: ▲ C$9.1 billion (2024)
- Net income: ▼ C$283 million (2024)
- Total assets: ▼ C$47.0 billion (2024)
- Total equity: ▼ C$27.1 billion (2024)
- Number of employees: 13,000+ (2023)
- Divisions: Teck Metals Ltd. (Vancouver); Teck Cominco Peru S.A. (Lima); Minera Torre de Oro, S.A. de C.V. (Mexico)
- Website: www.teck.com
- Footnotes; Teck 2024 Annual Report

Teck Resources Limited is a diversified natural resources company headquartered in Vancouver, British Columbia, that is engaged in mining and mineral development, including coal for the steelmaking industry, copper, zinc, and energy. Secondary products include lead, silver, gold, molybdenum, germanium, indium and cadmium. Teck Resources was formed from the amalgamation of Teck and Cominco in 2001.

In 2018, Teck Resources opened the C$17 billion Fort Hills oil sands project. In 2020, Teck abandoned plans for a second, larger C$20 billion open-pit petroleum-mine proposal—Frontier Mine—25 km (16 mi) south of Wood Buffalo National Park and north of Fort McMurray in northeast Alberta.

In 2020, a number of new executives were appointed to the company: Harry Conger as chief operating officer, Jonathan Price as chief financial officer, and Nicholas Hooper as senior vice president, corporate development.

== Overview ==
Vancouver-headquartered Teck Resources is a Canadian resource company focused on copper and zinc. It completed the sale of its steelmaking coal business in 2024, selling a minority interest to Nippon Steel and POSCO in January and its remaining 77% interest to Glencore in July. It had earlier sold its 21.3% interest in the Fort Hills oil sands project to Suncor Energy on February 2, 2023. Its operations include the Highland Valley Copper mine and Trail Operations in British Columbia, the Red Dog mine in Alaska, the Quebrada Blanca and Carmen de Andacollo mines in Chile, and a 22.5% interest in the Antamina mine in Peru, along with a pipeline of copper growth projects that includes Galore Creek, NewRange, Zafranal and NuevaUnión. In July 2025 Teck's board approved the Highland Valley Copper Mine Life Extension, which is expected to extend that mine's operations from 2028 to 2046.

As of 2025, copper accounted for 54% of Teck's revenue and zinc for 24%, with silver and lead by-products accounting for a further 13%. Revenue was C$10.8 billion in 2025, up from C$9.1 billion in 2024. Teck's share of 2025 production was 453,500 tonnes of copper, 565,000 tonnes of zinc in concentrate and 229,900 tonnes of refined zinc.

The collective agreement covering unionized workers at Highland Valley Copper expired on September 30, 2026, and on October 24, 2026, workers represented by United Steelworkers Local 7619 began a strike. Teck said operations were continuing at reduced capacity, and that the effect on production would depend on how long the strike lasted. The union put the number of workers involved at more than 1,200.

Teck formerly had interests in Alberta's oil sands, including Fort Hills—a C$17.0 billion project. CM&S, or "Smelters" as it was often called by investors, changed its name to Cominco in 1966. Cominco's core Sullivan Mine in Kimberley, British Columbia which began production of lead, zinc, silver and tin in 1909, would operate for more than 90 years until its ore reserves exhausted in 2001.

=== Teck-Hughes (1913–) ===
Teck-Hughes Gold Mines Limited was incorporated on 8 April 1913 to take over the Hughes-Reamsbottom claims at Kirkland Lake. The company was founded by a group of Toronto businessmen, all of whom were directors of the Great Northern Silver Company Limited. The original directors of the company were president A. D. Crooks, first vice-president Frank Plummer, second vice-president James A. Hughes, John H. Hyland, W. J. Green, S. H. Bradford, and William Ross Smyth. F. L. Cody was the first company secretary. Teck was capitalised at $2 million, and Great Northern Silver held a 25 per cent stake in the new company. Teck's first president was Alexander David Crooks (1864–1941), a prominent Toronto lawyer and partner in the firm Cameron & Crooks, which he had founded with Alexander Cameron. Crooks was the grandson of politician James Crooks, and the son-in-law of William Hodgson Ellis, dean of engineering at the University of Toronto.

In November 1913, an English syndicate led by C. A. Foster of Haileybury, Ontario and represented by Harry Cecil purchased $150,000 of Teck shares from Great Northern Silver Mines. The following month, the syndicate for Kirkland Lake Proprietary Limited as a holding company for its expanding portfolio of mines.

An American group of investors led by Charles Land Denison, including International Nickel Company (INCo)'s Albert W. Johnston, acquired two thirds of Teck-Hughes' shares. It was Ontario's first gold mine in commercial production. At the Teck-Hughes annual meeting on 17 October 1915, the Buffalo group took control of the company formally. Charles Land Denison (1886–1930) replaced Crooks as president. R. W. Pomeroy of Buffalo was elected vice-president, Crooks became secretary, and H. Clark became treasurer. The other directors were A. W. Johnston and J. F. Thompson.

On 8 October 1930, president Denison died at his home in Saddle River, New Jersey. Later that month, Albert Wheeler Johnston (1871–1952) was appointed president to succeed the late Denison. Johnston remained president until June 1932, when he was succeeded by Dr David Law Hobbes Forbes (1881–1962). Upon his accession to the presidency, Forbes moved the company's head offices from New York to Toronto. Concurrently, Johnston was made the company's first chairman of the board. In June 1947, Johnston retired as chairman of the board.

At the company's annual meeting on 3 May 1954, Forbes retired as president. His successor was Herbert Chipman "Chip" McCloskey (1886–1954). However, just over two weeks later, on 19 May McCloskey died in his office from a heart attack. The following month, John Charles Perry (1900–1965) was appointed to the presidency.

When the ore was exhausted in the 1960s, after 50 years of production, it had produced 3.7 million ounces of gold worth C$104 million. The Beaverdell Mine, purchased by Teck in 1969, went back even further to 1898, and produced silver until 1991. Norman B. Keevil (b.1910 in Pike Lake, Saskatchewan) a mining entrepreneur with a background in geophysics, acquired Teck-Hughes in the 1960s. In 1963, his son, geoscientist Norman Keevil Jr., then 25-years old, became vice-president of exploration at Teck. Keevil Jr. was named Mining Man of the Year in 1979 for having presided over a series of mine constructions in the 1970s. From 1979 to 2015, Keevil oversaw Teck's major mining projects including Hemlo, Voisey's Bay and Antamina. Over the same time period, Teck became "one of the world's largest producers of metallurgical coal." In 2012, as Chairman of Teck Resources Limited, Keevil Jr. was named as the Entrepreneur Of The Year for his significant contributions to British Columbia.

=== Teck Cominco ===
Teck Cominco logo before 2008 rebranding

The association between Teck and Cominco began in 1986, when Teck and two industry partners acquired a shareholding from CP Limited, and culminated with the merging of the two companies in July 2001.

On May 8, 2006, Teck Cominco offered to purchase Inco for $US16 billion, but CVRD eventually purchased it for $US17 billion. On July 29, 2008, Teck Cominco announced an agreement with Fording Canadian Coal Trust, which owned a 60% stake in the Elk Valley Coal Partnership, to purchase 100% of its assets. Teck Cominco had been the minority owner of the Elk Valley Coal Partnership, with a 40% stake. The facilities are located near Fernie, British Columbia. The purchase was closed on October 30, 2008, with a final cost of $US14 billion. (Note: USD) Elk Valley Coal Corporation was renamed Teck Coal Limited. The purchase resulted in Teck taking on US$9.8 billion in debt; the company suspended dividends, cut spending, and sold some assets to save money. On January 9, 2009, the company also announced a plan to cut 13% of their total workforce, amounting to 1,400 jobs, saving the company US$85 million. Coal production targets were also lowered by 20% in response to declining worldwide demand for steel, in the midst of the 2008 financial crisis.

=== Teck Resources (2008–) ===
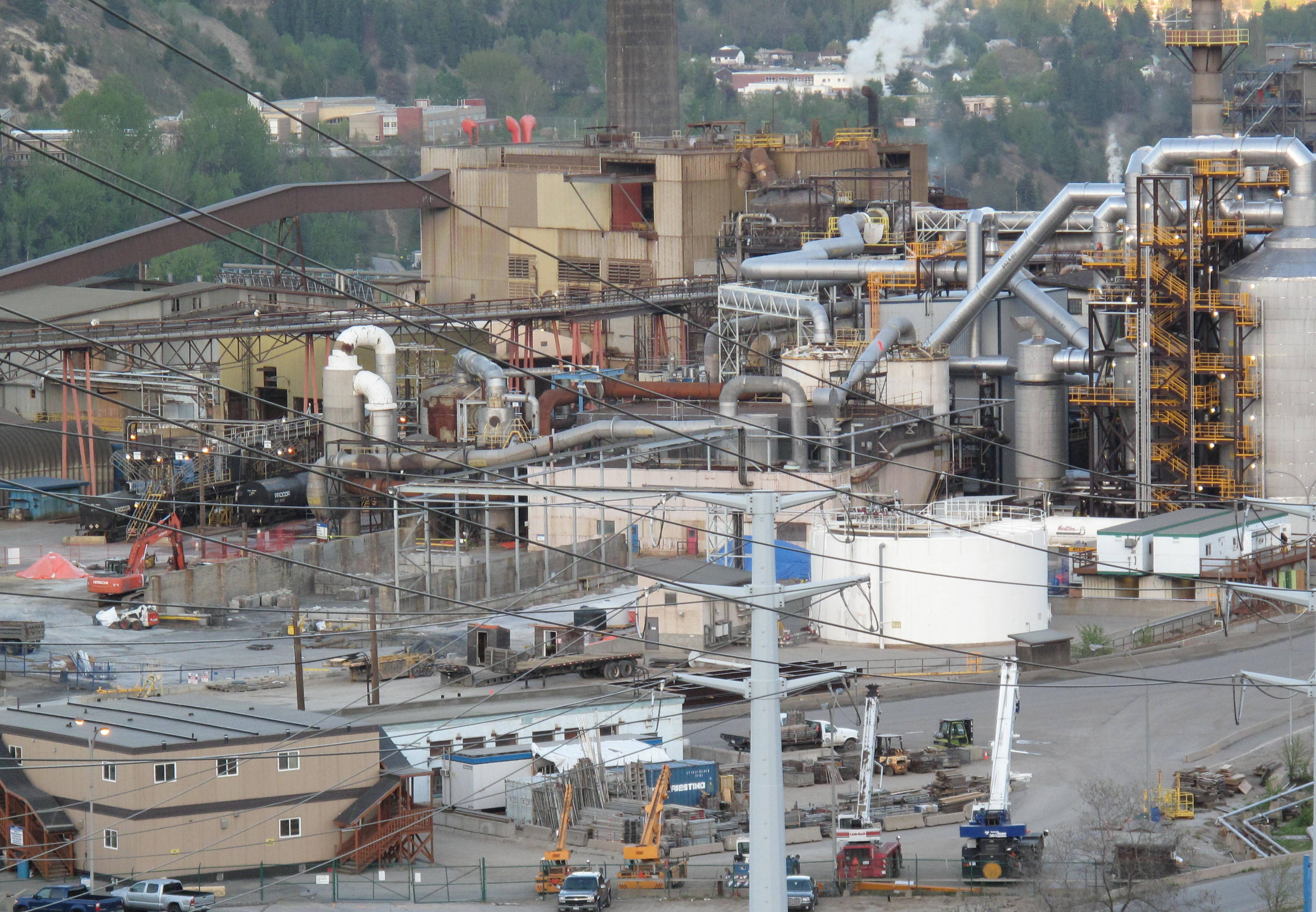
Mining in British Columbia in 2016

Beginning October 1, 2008, Teck Cominco began rebranding itself as Teck. The legal name of the company was changed to Teck Resources Ltd. on April 23, 2009, after being approved by shareholders the previous day. In 2008, Teck's $25 million donation to BC Children's Hospital Foundation earned its name attached to the Teck Acute Care Centre expected to complete construction in 2017.

In July 2009, China Investment Corporation bought a 17% stake in Teck for C$1.74 billion. In 2012, the Company announced record earning, record profit and record production, thus ending the year 2011 with C$4.4 billion in cash. Besides expanding into the energy sector, the company was also executing two major projects in Chile and planning a C$600 million restart of its Quintette Mine near Tumbler Ridge, British Columbia.

In 2021, Teck Resources was ranked no. 60 in the Arctic Environmental Responsibility Index (AERI) that includes 120 oil, gas, and mining companies involved in resource extraction north of the Arctic Circle in Alaska, Canada, Greenland, Finland, Norway, Russia, and Sweden.

The company's board rejected a US$23.1 billion hostile takeover offer by Swiss competitor Glencore in April 2023. In November 2023, Teck Resources decided to divest its steelmaking coal businesses in a series of transactions that value the operations at US$9 billion with Glencore taking majority ownership (77%). The remaining interests are acquired by Japan's Nippon Steel (20%) and South Korea's POSCO (3%). The deal received government approval in July 2024, allowing Teck Resources to become purely a metals producer with the focus in copper and zinc.

On 9 September 2025, London-headquartered Anglo American and Teck Resources announced they had reached an agreement to combine the two companies in a merger of equals to form the Anglo Teck group, a global critical minerals champion and top five global copper producer, headquartered in Canada and expected to offer investors more than 70% exposure to copper. In December 2025, shareholders approved the merger, followed by an approval by Canada’s industry minister, Mélanie Joly.

== Operations and major projects ==
Teck's principal products are steel-making coal, copper, and zinc. As of 2016, 44% of revenue was from steel-making coal, 34% of revenue was from zinc, and the remaining 21% was from copper. Teck also has interests in oil sands projects in Northern Alberta.

=== Coal ===
In 2018, Teck produced 26.2 million tonnes of coal from six mines in southeastern British Columbia and western Alberta, with most of it exported to countries in the Asia-Pacific region. The coal is transported to ports and destinations in Eastern Canada through rail lines owned by Canadian Pacific. There was formerly a mine in Alberta—Cardinal River Mine in Hinton, Alberta which stopped production in June 2020, and four steelmaking coal operations in British Columbia: Fording River coal mine in Elkford, Elkview Mine in Sparwood, Greenhills Mine in Elkford and Line Creek Mine in Sparwood. In February 2023, the subsidiary is fined more than $16 million for polluting waterways in the East Kootenay.

=== Zinc ===
In 2016, Teck produced 662,000 tonnes of zinc in concentrate, and 311,000 tonnes of refined zinc. It was the world's third largest producer of mined zinc. Almost all of its mined zinc comes from the Red Dog mine in Alaska, one of the largest zinc mines in the world. It also produces refined zinc at its smelting and refining complex in Trail, British Columbia. The Trail complex also produces zinc refining byproducts, which as of 2016 included 99,000 tonnes of refined lead and 24.2 million ounces of silver.

=== Copper ===
In 2016, Teck produced 324,200 tonnes of copper from mines in North and South America. Its largest mine is the Highland Valley Copper mine near Logan Lake, British Columbia, with 119,000 tonnes of copper and 3.4 million pounds of molybdenum produced in 2016. Teck has a 22.5% interest in the Antamina mine in Peru, one of the largest copper/zinc mines in the world. Teck also runs the Carmen de Andacollo and Quebrada Blanca mines in Chile. In the former mine Teck owns 90% and Chilean state-owned ENAMI owns the remaining. In the 2020s Teck Resources has sought to implement a large expansion plan for Quebrada Blanca known as Fase 2 and called by Ex-Ante "the largest mining investment [in Chile] in the last 15 years". This is one of the largest mine expansion plans in the world. The project has run at an overcost of US$ 4,000 million, mainly due to problems in the mineral processing plant, geotechnical problems and problems in the storage of tailings.

=== Solar ===
In 2020, Teck announced an agreement to purchase the city of Kimberley, British Columbia's debt stake in the SunMine solar electricity generating station. The 1.05 MW facility was constructed in 2015 on land reclaimed from Teck's Sullivan Mine, which had produced zinc, lead, and silver until its closing in 2001. CEO Don Lindsay explained that the company planned to use SunMine to develop expertise in solar power and renewable energy development.

== Oil sands open-pit mining operations ==
=== Fort Hills ===
In 2018, Teck Resources opened the C$17-billion Fort Hills oilsands project, which will produce 194,000 barrels per day (bbl/day). Teck Resources had a 21.3% stake in the project alongside Suncor Energy's 54.1% and Paris-based Total SE's 24.6%. At the September opening of Fort Hills, Calgary-based Suncor Energy's CEO Steve Williams said that, "It's unlikely there will be projects of this type of scale again...What Fort Hills gives us is a strategic anchor in a vast reserve up here." Williams was optimistic about the future of the oil sands for years to come, but at a different scale.

In October 2022, Teck announced its intention to sell its then 21.3% stake in the project to majority owner Suncor for $1 billion, which would bring Suncor's stake to 75.4%. However, co-owner Total SE filed an application to Alberta's Court of Queen's Bench disputing Teck's terms for right of first refusal on the sale, asking that the 90-day period which Total was given to decide be suspended until its application was reviewed by the courts.

=== Frontier Mine ===
In 2009, for the first time since the 1980s, what is now known as the Alberta Energy Regulator (AER) changed the oil sands mining boundaries in the Athabasca oil sands in northeastern Alberta, Canada, partly in response to successful exploratory work that Teck and others had launched "north of the known limits"—on the west and east sides of the Athabasca River. When they "discovered a sizable resource", the AER extended the "boundaries" of the "surface mineable oilsands area" to include 14.5 townships. Teck and UTS, who had done the exploratory work together, initiated the regulatory process for Frontier in March 2008.

Frontier Mine is considered to be one of the largest oil sands mines ever proposed in Alberta. The "292 km^{2} (113 sq mi) open-pit petroleum-mining operation" was to be located about 120 km (75 mi) north of Fort McMurray, Alberta. The estimated cost of developing the Frontier operation was C$20 billion. According to Financial Post, this was more than "Teck's own market capitalization of C$18 billion." (Note: In the 2018 annual report, Teck included a "Cautionary Statement on Forward-Looking Statements" and listed a number of potential factors that could impact on their forward looking statements including improved "unit operating costs at Fort Hills", the "debottlenecking" of crude oil, expanded production at Fort Hills", delivery to customers, The Frontier projects's timing as related to the "review and permitting process", the "credit facilities", "sources of liquidity and capital resources", the impact of exchange rates, commodity prices (the global price of WTI crude oil), carbon pricing policies, and associated costs that would affect profits for shareholders and the EBITDA. See "Commodity Prices and 2018 Production".) (Note: Fort Hills and Frontier market their crude oil, Western Canadian Select (WCS), the benchmark for Canadian crude oil, through Hardisty. It "trades at a differential below the NYMEX West Texas Intermediate WTI benchmark price". At the time of their 2018 annual report, "WTI averaged US$64.77 per barrel with WCS priced at US$19.35 per barrel with an average differential or discount in Q4 of US$39.45 per barrel. "Hardisty differentials widened substantially in the quarter as increases in production strained crude oil export infrastructure and regional storage capacities.")

The Frontier mine 25 km (16 mi) south of Wood Buffalo National Park and north of Fort McMurray in northeast Alberta, was projected to produce 260,000 bbl/day every year for more than 40 years. Its first phase in 2026 would produce 85,000 bbl/day. The second phase would begin in 2036. The mine would potentially result in "billions of dollars of federal and province taxes".

In the summer of 2019, a federal-provincial review concluded that Frontier Mine would be "in the public interest, even though it would be likely to harm the environment and the land, resources and culture of Indigenous people." Teck would use the paraffinic froth treatment (PFT) for the Frontier project, a technology that is already in use at Fort Hills, Imperial Oil's Kearl Oil Sands, and Canadian Natural Resources's (CNRL) Athabasca Oil Sands Project (AOSP). This technology, which eliminates the use of an upgrader, has a "lower GHG intensity than about half of the oil currently refined in the U.S.", according to Teck. The federal Environment Minister, Jonathan Wilkinson, told Canadian Press on January 28, 2020, that the federal cabinet's decision...will weigh what the province is doing to help Canada achieve its climate goal of net zero emissions by 2050. (Note: The National Observer, Canadian Mining, CBC, and Global reports are based on content first published by The Canadian Press on January 28, 2020 with files from Lauren Krugel in Calgary.) In a statement, Jason Nixon, Alberta's Environment Minister said that "[A]ll 14 First Nation groups in the region of the proposed mine have economic agreements of support with Teck." At a CIBC investor conference in Banff, Alberta, CEO Don Lindsay said that the Frontier mining project could only go ahead if the "economics of the project make sense", according to a January 29, 2020 Globe and Mail article. Lindsay told the government that Teck will only proceed with the project if the pipeline is finished, "not just started, finished"; if Teck can find a partner; and if the price of oil makes the project viable.

The decision on regulatory approval by the federal government cabinet was expected in February 2020, but on February 23 Teck withdrew its application for the mine in advance of the decision. In a statement, Teck said that it had already invested $1.13 billion and 10 years in the project, waiting for regulatory and local approval. It stated, "The promise of Canada's potential will not be realized until governments can reach agreement around how climate policy considerations will be addressed in the context of future responsible energy sector development. Without clarity on this critical question, the situation that has faced Frontier will be faced by future projects and it will be very difficult to attract future investment, either domestic or foreign.... Teck has not taken this decision lightly. It is our hope that the decision to withdraw will help to create both the space and impetus needed for this critical discussion to take place for the benefit of all Canadians."

== Controversies ==
=== Contamination of the Columbia River ===
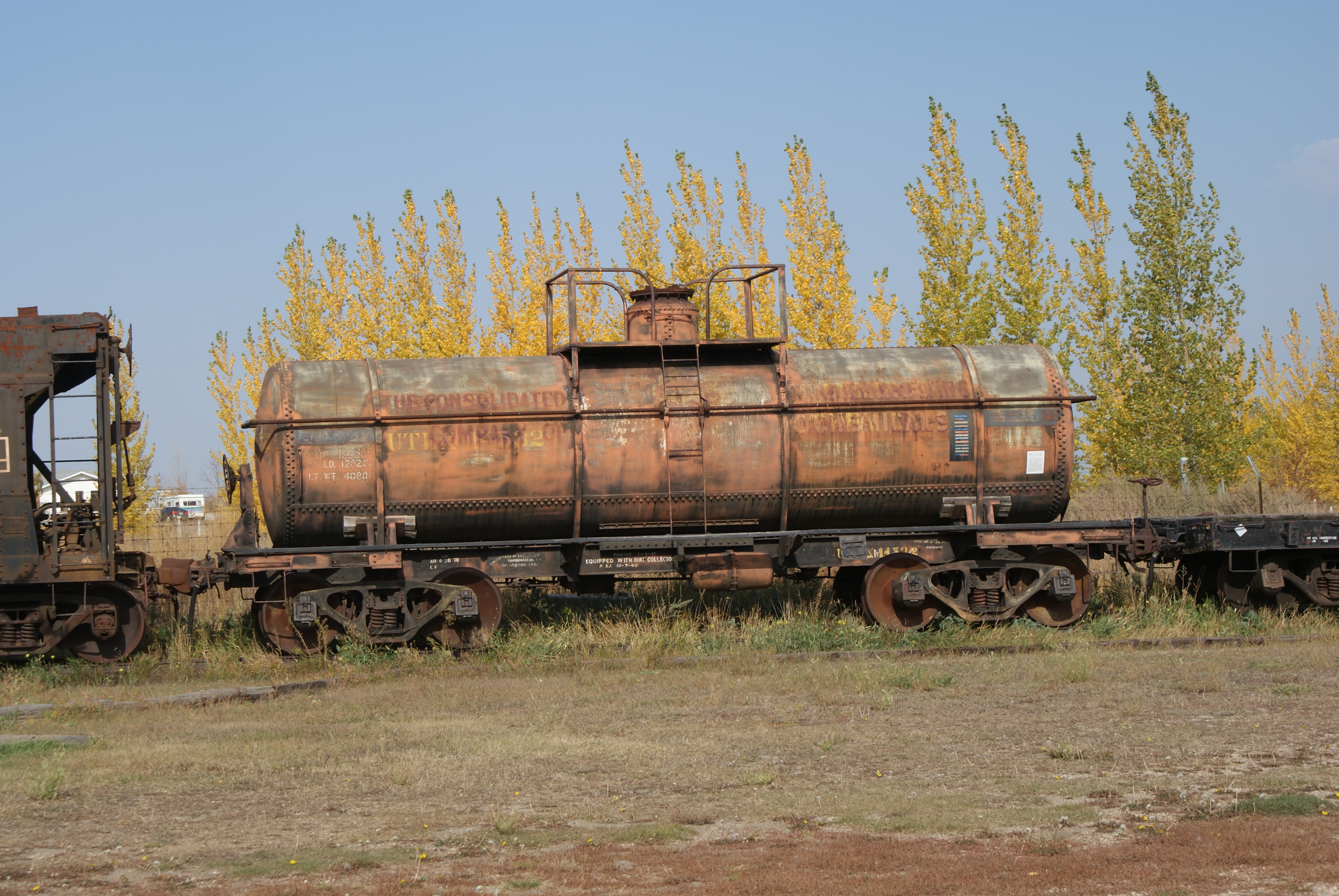
Cominco tank car

In 2004, in response to the decades of heavy contamination of the Columbia River by Teck, a citizen lawsuit was filed against Teck, under the 1980 Comprehensive Environmental Response, Compensation, and Liability Act (CERCLA)—now known as the Superfund. Teck fought the case for years and finally lost in a 2018 ruling which fined Teck US$8 million for pollution. From 1930 and 1995, the "Canadian mining giant Teck Resources Ltd." had "discharged about 400 tons of slag daily — an estimated 9.97 million tons in total" — directly into the Upper Columbia River.

The company's smelter in Trail, British Columbia was blamed in 2003 for heavily contaminating the Columbia River. Legal action taken by American citizens living in settlements downriver progressed to the U.S. Supreme Court and was denied certiorari, solidifying the Appellate Court's holding that Teck is subject to U.S. jurisdiction even though it is a Canadian company.

The Confederated Tribes of the Colville Reservation filed a lawsuit against Teck Cominco in 2004, claiming the company had dumped 140,000 tons of slag directly into rivers adjacent to its Trail smelter between 1896 and 1995, polluting the surface water, ground water and sediment of the upper Columbia River and Lake Roosevelt with hazardous metals including arsenic, cadmium, mercury, lead, copper and zinc.

The Trail smelter was also the site of a lead spill into the Columbia River on May 28, 2008.

A September 2012 Globe and Mail article reported that the day the 2012 trial, "Canadian mining giant Teck Resources Ltd." had admitted in a U.S. court that effluent from its smelter in southeast British Columbia ha[d] polluted the Columbia River in Washington state for more than a century." The agreement, reached on the eve of the trial initiated by the Colville Confederated Tribes, stipulates that some hazardous materials in the slag discharged from Teck's smelter in Trail, B.C., ended up in the Upper Columbia River south of the border.

In his 2018 ruling in Pakootas, Michel and Confederated Tribes of the Colville Reservation v. Teck Cominco Metals, the United States District Judge for the District of Oregon, Michael J. McShane, agreed with the lower courts against Teck, and fined Teck US$8 million for pollution. The company was fined $2.2 million in 2023.

=== Selenium contamination ===
According to a March 8, 2021 article in The Narwhal, concerns have been raised about selenium pollution leaching from Teck Resources' Elk Valley open pit coal mines' waste rock, which is upstream from the Lake Koocanusa water system. Lake Koocanusa is in both British Columbia, Canada and Montana, United States. A September 24, 2020 Montana Department of Environmental Quality presentation to the Board of Environmental Review Meeting, reported that the 95% of the selenium coming into Lake Koocanusa originates from the Elk River "which has been contaminated by current and historic coal mining in the Elk Valley."

By September 2020, the average selenium levels in Lake Koocanusa were 1 part per billion, while Montana had established new standards for selenium of 0.8 parts per billion. Because of the high bioaccumulation of selenium in fish, excessive levels of selenium in an aquatic ecosystem has implications for human health.

In the spring of 2020, Teck Resources had "reported a dramatic decline in adult westslope cutthroat trout in Elk Valley waterways closest to its mines". Since 2015, British Columbia and Montana have agreed to adopt aligned standards for selenium levels by 2020. Montana's has been in force since the fall of 2020, but British Columbia has not aligned their standards yet.

=== Environmental record: Airborne lead ===
Trail, the home of Teck's large lead-zinc smelter, has an extensive history of smelting. This has resulted in above-limit levels of lead, arsenic, zinc, and cadmium in soils in certain parts of the city. Starting in 2007, a free soil-testing program (paid for by Teck via the Trail Area Health and Environment Program) was instituted, with the priority being the removal of above-limit topsoils in residential yards of families with young children. The existing contamination has been attributed to the smelting activities that pre-date the 1997 advent of newer technologies at the smelting operation.

The Trail Area Health and Environment Program is expected to continue for the foreseeable future, with the ultimate goal entailing soil sampling (with remediation on an as-needed basis) on all properties in Trail.

=== Red Dog Mine toxic waste ===
In 2007, the company's Red Dog mine operation in north-western Alaska has been ranked by the U.S. Environmental Protection Agency as one of the most polluting facilities in the United States based on output tonnage of toxic waste, largely (over 99%) in the form of blasted and moved, but otherwise unprocessed, waste rock from mining operations. Residents living downstream from the mine launched a lawsuit against Teck Cominco, demanding that the Red Dog mine complies with its environmental obligations and that it pay fines for continuing to violate its water permit requirements. On November 30, 2007, the company released the final report of its six-year study, with the oversight of the Alaska Department of Environmental Conservation, of risks of dust escaping from traffic along the DeLong Mountain Regional Transportation System Road. The final report incorporates formal comments and input from a wide range of government agencies and stakeholders, including local village residents. The risk assessment concludes it is safe to consume subsistence foods in all areas without restrictions.

=== Chinese government ties ===
In 2016, Teck Resources shareholders elected ex-deputy to China's National People's Congress, Quan Chong, to Teck's board of directors. Executive director of IntegrityBC, Dermod Travis, said: "When I saw this, it completely jumped out. It is wrong at so many levels. I think we need to look at how we engage with foreign entities, whether they're governments or companies, in terms of buying our natural resources and ensure we are not also giving up part of our boardroom sovereignty."

== Indigenous rights ==
In 2016, Teck Alaska Inc., a subsidiary of Teck Resources Ltd., was ranked as the best of 92 oil, gas, and mining companies on upholding indigenous rights in the Arctic.

== Awards and recognition ==
On its 2007 web page, Teck Resources listed over two dozen awards that the company had received from 2004 through 2007, for specific mines and operations. This includes awards for individual operations that had low accident frequency, good underground safety, volunteerism, conservation, reclamation, and excellence in business.

Teck Resources is the number one sponsor for the twenty-team ice hockey league, the Kootenay International Junior Hockey League with the KIJHL Championship named the Teck Cup.

== Leadership ==
=== President ===
1. Alexander David Crooks, 8 April 1913 – 17 October 1915
2. Charles Land Denison, 17 October 1915 – 8 October 1930 †
3. Albert Wheeler Johnston, October 1930 – June 1932
4. Dr David Law Hodges Forbes, June 1932 – May 1954
5. Herbert Chipman McCloskey, 3 May 1954 – 19 May 1954 †
6. John Charles Perry, June 1954 – 1963
7. Dr Norman Bell Keevil Sr., 1963 – October 1981
8. Dr Norman Bell Keevil Jr., October 1981 – 1 June 2000
9. Steven G. Dean, 1 June 2000 – 8 July 2002
10. Donald Richard Lindsay, 1 January 2005 – 30 September 2022
11. Harry Milton Conger IV, 30 September 2022 – 1 November 2023
12. Jonathan Huw Price, 1 November 2023 – present

=== Chairman of the Board ===
1. Albert Wheeler Johnston, June 1932 – June 1947
2. Daniel Roland Michener, October 1963 – 30 September 1964
3. John Charles Perry, 1 October 1964 – 11 January 1965 †
4. Dr Norman Bell Keevil Sr., January 1965 – February 1974
5. Daniel Roland Michener, February 1974 – October 1981
6. Dr Norman Bell Keevil Sr., October 1981 – 9 October 1989 †
7. Robert James Wright, September 1994 – 1 June 2000
8. Dr Norman Bell Keevil Jr., 1 June 2000 – 1 October 2018
9. Dominic Barton, 1 October 2018 – 4 September 2019
10. Sheila A. Murray, 4 September 2019 – present

† = died in office

== See also ==
- List of coal mines in Canada
- Trail Smelter dispute
- Teck Cominco smelter
