= Lorraine Elizabeth Wooster =

American lawyer

Lorraine Elizabeth Wooster (July 24, 1868–July 4, 1953) was an educator, politician, and attorney from the U.S. state of Kansas. She was the first woman to hold a statewide elected office in Kansas, serving as State Superintendent of Public Instruction from 1919 until 1923.

Wooster was born in Ohio, but her family moved to Mitchell County, Kansas when she was young. She began her teaching career in a local one-room schoolhouse when she was 16. She moved to Salina in 1894 and began writing textbooks; she sold her books to schools across the country, and established a publishing company in Chicago for her books in 1907.

Wooster first ran for Kansas State Superintendent of Public Instruction in 1916. Though her campaign failed, she ran again two years later and was elected, making her the first woman elected to a statewide office in Kansas. In her campaigns, she had argued that as 80% of Kansas' teachers were female, she was well suited to represent them. Kansas' early support for women's suffrage also helped her, as women earned the right to vote in 1912 and were active voters by the time of her election.

As state superintendent, Wooster promoted more funding for schools, longer school years for rural students, and requiring students to attend school through 16. However, she was also known for the strict codes of moral behavior which she applied to the state's teachers. She insisted that teachers not smoke, drink, dance, or wear makeup; in the case of the latter, she was known to tell teachers to "get that paint off your face" during school visits. She was reelected in 1920, but her moral code led to her downfall; after controversially attempting to fire teachers in Cimarron for attending a dance, she lost her campaign for a third term in 1922.

After leaving office, Wooster continued her career as an attorney. She served as Vice President of the National Association of Women Lawyers and ran an unsuccessful campaign for Kansas Attorney General in 1932. She moved to Chicago in 1934, where she lived until her death in 1953.
