= Louis S. Cates =

American business person and philanthropist (1881–1959)

Louis S. Cates (20 December 1881– 29 October 1959) was an American mining engineer and businessman. He was president of Phelps Dodge from 1930 to 1947.

== Biography ==
Louis Shattuck Cates was born in Boston, Massachusetts. In 1902, he received a mining engineering degree from Massachusetts Institute of Technology .

At the beginning of the twentieth century, he began his career as superintendent of the Boston Consolidated operation in Utah, where he made a successful copper mine for Samuel Newhouse and his Boston backers. In 1910, Boston Con was acquired by the adjacent Utah Copper Company, the gigantic open pit operation at Bingham, Utah. Utah Copper Company's General Manager Daniel C. Jackling (1869–1956), was impressed with Cates and, after a short stint at Bingham Canyon, transferred Cates to manage the Ray Consolidated copper mining operation at Ray, Arizona. Cates introduced the profitable block-caving method at Ray, one of the new porphryr copper mines being opened at a grand scale at the time. His success during the 1910s–20s within the Jackling operations, reorganized under the 1915 formed Kennecott Corporation, proved his worth. Known for his gruff style and limited personal skills, he was a dogged manager whose single-focus made his many operations successful.

He led the Phelps Dodge Company from 1930 to 1947. During that time the company acquired the Nichols Copper Company, the Calumet and Arizona Mining Company, and the United Verde Copper Company. Under Cates' leadership Phelps-Dodge became an integrated copper industry operation. During his tenure the capital stock of Phelps-Dodge more than quadrupled in value, despite the Great Depression. He expanded Phelps Dodge mining operations at Bisbee, Jerome, Ajo, and especially the opening of the world-class Clay copper ore body at Morenci, Arizona, still one of the world's largest copper producers. He also re-invented Phelps Dodge as a vertical – integrated – copper producer, from mine pit to finished product.

Cates resigned as president of Phelps Dodge in 1947. He remained chairman of the board until his death in 1959. Phelps Dodge would remain a copper leader until acquired by Freeport-McMoRan. At the time of its acquisition in 2007, Phelps Dodge Corporation had large copper mining operations in Bagdad, Morenci, Sahuarita, Safford and Miami, Arizona as well as holdings in New Mexico.

== Honors ==
- William Lawrence Saunders Gold Medal – 1939
- President of the American Institute of Mining, Metallurgical, and Petroleum Engineers – 1946

== Other sources ==
- Cleland, Robert Glass (2012) A History of Phelps Dodge, 1834–1950 (New York: Alfred A. Knopf, Inc.) ISBN 978-1258258467
- Schwantes, Carlos A. (2000) Vision and Enterprise: Exploring the History of the Phelps Dodge Corporation (Tucson: University of Arizona Press) ISBN 978-0816519439
