= The Record (Columbia University) =

Official university newspaper

The Record is the official newspaper of the Columbia University administration.

The inaugural issue of University Record was published in September 1973. On 22 July 1975, restarting volume 1, issue 1. It later became Record, and then took its current name.

It has been published roughly biweekly or monthly during academic terms.

Former writers for the Columbia University Record include Jo Kadlecek. The former managing editor is Amy Callahan.
