= Fording River coal mine =

Coal mine in British Columbia, Canada

Fording River Coal Mine
- Location within Regional District of East Kootenay Location within British Columbia
- Location: British Columbia, Canada; 50.199°N 114.844°W
- Products: Coking coal
- Company: Elk Valley Resources, Teck Coal

The Fording River Coal Mine is a coal mine located in British Columbia, Canada. The mine has coal reserves amounting to 263.8 million tonnes of coking coal, one of the largest coal reserves in Canada and the world. The mine has an annual production capacity of 8.34 million tonnes of coal. Selenium and nitrate pollution from the mine has been a concern, with Teck being fined $15.48 million in 2023 for failing to activate a wastewater treatment plant downstream of the mine. Due to concerns over pollution as well as disruption to the landscape and habitat/migration routes of bighorn sheep, the local Ktunaxa first nation has protested the Fording River expansion project.

== See also ==
- List of coal mines in Canada
