= Elkview coal mine =

Coal mine in British Columbia, Canada

Elkview Coal Mine
- Location in Canada
- Location: Sparwood, British Columbia, Canada; 49°45′08″N 114°52′38″W
- Products: Coking coal
- Production: 4.19 million tonnes coal
- Company: Glencore (77.0%); Nippon Steel (20.0%); POSCO (3.0%)
- Acquired: 2024

The Elkview Coal Mine is a coal mine located in the British Columbia. The mine has coal reserves amounting to 220.6 million tonnes of coking coal, one of the largest coal reserves in Canada and the world. The mine has an annual production capacity of 4.19 million tonnes of coal.
