= Walter Hull Aldridge =

American mining engineer (1867–1959)

- Born: September 8, 1867; Brooklyn, New York, U.S.
- Died: August 8, 1959 (aged 91); New York City, New York, U.S.
- Education: Columbia University
- Occupation: Mining engineer
- Employer: Texas Gulf Sulphur Company
- Awards: John Fritz Medal (1949); William Lawrence Saunders Gold Medal (1933)

Walter Hull Aldridge (September 8, 1867 – August 8, 1959) was an American mining and metallurgical engineer. He was a recipient of the William Lawrence Saunders Gold Medal and the John Fritz Medal.

== Biography ==
Aldridge was born in Brooklyn on September 8, 1867. He was a descendant of Commodore Isaac Hull, Revolutionary General William Hull, and Commodore Matthew C. Perry. He was educated in the public schools of Brooklyn, and attended Brooklyn Polytechnic Institute, followed by Columbia School of Mines, graduating in 1887 as an Engineer of Mines. He was a member of the Tau Beta Pi honor society.

After graduating from Columbia, Aldridge became an assayer for the Colorado Smelting Company and became a chemist and metallurgist for the company. In 1892, he became manager of the United Smelting & Refining Company. After the takeover of the company by the American Smelting & Refining Company, Aldridge left his job and joined Canadian Pacific Railway, and was placed in charge of all the mining and metallurgical work of the railroad, which was incorporated into the Consolidated Mining and Smelting Company of Canada. As managing director of the company, he established lead and copper works at Trail, British Columbia, built the world's first electrolytic lead refinery, and developed the Hosmer and Bankhead coal mines. Under his watch, gold and silver were melted, smelted, and refined for the first time in Canada.

Aldridge then became associated with William B. Thompson of the Gunn-Thompson Company, overseeing Thompson's extensive milling interests. He was a director of The Consolidated Mining and Smelting Company of Canada, Hosmer Mines Company, Bankhead Mines Company, and the High River Wheat & Cattle Company.

Aldridge became President of the Texas Gulf Sulphur Company, succeeding Seeley G. Mudd, who resigned from the presidency to enter military service. He served as president until July 1951, and retired at the age of 83. Aldridge remained chairman of the company. He transformed the company into the world's largest producer of sulpher and the largest source of the cheap, pure sulphur.

Aldridge received a William Lawrence Saunders Gold Medal for distinguished achievement in mining in 1933. He received a John Fritz Medal in 1949, cited as "as engineer of mines and statesman of industry who by his rare technical and administrative skills has importantly augmented the mineral production of [the United States] and Canada."

Aldridge died on August 8, 1959. He lived at 740 Park Avenue and Scarsdale, New York.
