= James Boyd (engineer) =

American mining engineer

8th Director of the U.S. Bureau of Mines
- In office August 1947 – 1951
- Preceded by: Royd R. Sayers
- Succeeded by: John J. Forbes

Personal details
- Born: December 20, 1904 Kanowna, Western Australia
- Died: November 24, 1987 (aged 82)
- Spouse(s): Ruth Brown (m. 1932; died 1979) Clemence DeGraw Jandrey (m. 1981)
- Children: 4
- Education: California Institute of Technology (B.S.); Colorado School of Mines (M.S., D.Sc.)
- Awards: Hoover Medal
- Military career
- Allegiance: United States
- Branch: United States Army
- Service years: 1941–1946
- Rank: Colonel
- Conflicts: World War II
- Awards: Legion of Merit

James Boyd (December 20, 1904 – November 24, 1987) was an American mining engineer and educator. He led the Metals and Minerals Branch of the Commodities Division of the Army–Navy Munitions Board during World War II and served as the 8th director of the U.S. Bureau of Mines.

== Early life ==
James Boyd was born on December 20, 1904, in Kanowna, Western Australia to Mary (née Cane) and Julian Boyd, a mining engineer and an Australian World War I veteran. Julian Boyd was the son of a Sydney stockbroker who assisted Herbert Hoover with financing his mining ventures.

Boyd went to Canon McClement's School in Perth. His family moved to Surrey, England in 1917. He attended a prep school in Kenley for a year and a half and then Oundle School in Northamptonshire for three years, but did not graduate. In December 1921, the family moved to Hollywood, California and Boyd graduated from Hollywood High School in 1923. He became a citizen of the United States in 1925 or 1927.

Boyd received a Bachelor of Science in engineering and economics from the California Institute of Technology in 1927. He then received a Master of Science in geophysics in 1932 and Doctor of Science in geology in 1934 at the Colorado School of Mines. He was a member of Reserve Officers' Training Corps while at Caltech. He was admitted to Tau Beta Pi while at the Colorado School of Mines.

== Career ==
=== Early career ===
In 1927, Boyd started his career with the Radiore Company, a subsidiary of Southwest Engineering Company. He worked in Quebec performing electromagnetic prospecting. He left the company in September 1929.

=== Teaching career ===
From 1929 to 1941, Boyd taught at the Colorado School of Mines. He also performed consulting work, did summer work with the United States Geological Survey, and formed the B. E. Moritz Instruments Company with Bert Moritz. He started as an instructor of geology and in 1938, he became an associate professor of economic geology. From 1946 to 1947, Boyd served as the Dean of Faculty of the Colorado School of Mines. He later served as the chairman of the Colorado School of Mines Advisory Board.

=== Military career ===
Boyd was inducted into the U.S. Army as a captain in the summer of 1941. Boyd served under the Undersecretary of War Robert Patterson by leading the Metals and Minerals Branch of the Commodities Division of the Army–Navy Munitions Board. He also joined the staff of the Metals Reserve Company, a division of the Reconstruction Finance Corporation tasked with procuring metals and minerals for U.S. defense forces. He later served on the War Production Board and as an executive officer to General Lucius D. Clay. He attained the rank of colonel under General Clay. After the war, he continued serving under General Clay as the executive director of the Industry Division of the Office of Military Government, United States in Germany.

=== U.S. Bureau of Mines ===
In 1947, Boyd was serving as special assistant to the U.S. Secretary of the Interior Julius Krug and then as the Defense Minerals Administrator. Starting in August 1947, Boyd served as the interim director of the U.S. Bureau of Mines. Boyd's nomination was disputed by John L. Lewis, head of the United Mine Workers union. He would not be confirmed by congress as the director until March 22, 1949. He served in the role until 1951. At the onset of the Korean War and later the Vietnam War, Boyd pushed for more domestic mineral production for war production.

=== Mining career ===
In 1951, Boyd joined the Kennecott Copper Corporation as exploration manager. In 1955, he became the Vice President of Exploration at Kennett Copper. In 1960, he became the president of Copper Range Company and then became the chairman of the board of directors in 1970. While at Copper Range, he presided over the expansion of the White Pine Copper Mine in Michigan and getting a major interest in the Round Mountain Gold Mine in Nevada.

In 1971, he was appointed executive director of the National Commission on Materials Policy, known as the "Boyd Commission", and chairman of the Materials Advisory Panel of the Congressional Office of Technology Assessment. He helped develop the National Materials and Minerals Policy Research and Development Act of 1980.

Boyd was a founder of the National Mining Hall of Fame. He also served as chairman of the National Science Foundation's Committee on Research. He was the director of the Detroit Edison Company, New Jersey Zinc, Felmont Petroleum, Copper Development Association and the International Copper Research Company.

== Personal life ==
Boyd married Ruth Brown in 1932. They met while Boyd was attending the Colorado School of Mines. Together, they had four sons: Jim, Bruce, Douglas and Hudson. His wife died in 1979. In 1981, Boyd married Clemence DeGraw Jandrey.

His contemporaries would refer to him as "Jim".

== Death ==
Boyd lived in Carmel, California in his late life and died on November 24, 1987.

== Awards ==
- Boyd received the Parker Medal from the American Institute of Professional Geologists.
- Boyd received the U.S. Army Legion of Merit with Oakleaf Cluster for "his contributions to settling immediate post-war problems"
- 1949 – honorary degree from the Montana School of Mines
- 1949 – Colorado School of Mines Distinguished Service Award
- 1956 – became a Fellow of the Geological Society of America
- 1962 - American Institute of Mining Engineers's Charles F. Rand Gold Medal
- 1964 – honorary degree from the Michigan Technological University
- 1965 – designated Copper Man of the Year by the Copper Club
- 1966 – California Institute of Technology Distinguished Service Award
- 1967 – elected to the National Academy of Engineering
- 1967 – Daniel C. Jackling Award
- 1973 – American Institute of Professional Geologists's Ben H. Parker Memorial Medal
- 1975 – American Society of Mechanical Engineers's Hoover Medal
- 1987 – American Institute of Mining, Metallurgical and Petroleum Engineers's Minerals Economics Award
- 1990 – inducted into the Mining Hall of Fame
