= Elburt F. Osborn =

American geochemist

13th Director of the U.S. Bureau of Mines
- In office October 23, 1970 – September 30, 1973
- Preceded by: John F. O'Leary
- Succeeded by: Thomas V. Falkie

Personal details
- Born: Elburt Franklin Osborn; August 13, 1911 Kishwaukee, Illinois, U.S.
- Died: January 19, 1998 (aged 86) State College, Pennsylvania, U.S.
- Resting place: Centre County Memorial Park; Centre County, Pennsylvania, U.S.
- Spouse: Jean McLeod Thomson (m. 1939)
- Children: 2
- Education: DePauw University (BA); Northwestern University (MS); California Institute of Technology (PhD)
- Occupation: educator; government official
- Awards: Roebling Medal

Elburt Franklin Osborn (August 13, 1911 – January 19, 1998) was an American geochemist and educator. He served as the 13th director of the U.S. Bureau of Mines.

== Early life ==
Elburt Franklin Osborn was born on August 13, 1911, in Kishwaukee, Illinois to Anna (née Sherman) and William Franklin Osborn. Osborn graduated with a Bachelor of Arts in geology from DePauw University in 1932. He received a Master of Science in petrology from Northwestern University in 1934 and a PhD in petrology from the California Institute of Technology in 1938.

== Career ==
In 1938, Osborn joined the Geophysical Lab at the Carnegie Institution for Science in Washington, D.C. He also served as a consultant of ballistic problems for Division I of the National Defense Research Committee during World War II. His work related to gun barrel erosion and internal ballistics.

In 1946, Osborn joined Pennsylvania State University as a professor of geochemistry and chairman of the earth sciences department. He then served as associate dean from 1952 to 1953 and served as dean of the College of Mineral Studies from 1953 to 1958. In 1952, Osborn, along with Thomas Bates, founded the Materials Characterization Laboratory. Osborn and his students have received international recognition for their research in the field of high temperature reactions as applied to iron and steel technology and to volcanic phenomena. He became the vice president for research at Penn State in 1959 and served in that role until 1970. During his 11 years as vice president, he helped to quadruple research budgets at Penn State (from US$9 million to US$36 million). He remained affiliated with the university until resigning on August 14, 1971. Under his leadership, Penn State introduced the first interdisciplinary curriculum in solid state technology in 1960 and opened the Interdisciplinary Materials Research Laboratory in 1962.

Osborn was appointed director of the U.S. Bureau of Mines on October 23, 1970. As director, he helped establish the Pennsylvania Mining and Mineral Resources Research Institute. He left the role on September 30, 1973. In 1973, he became a professor at the geophysical laboratory of Carnegie Institute. From 1978 to 1987, he served as a senior research fellow at Carnegie Institute. In 1974, Osborn was named as the chairman of the National Research Council's Board on Mineral Resources.

He served as president of the Mineralogical Society of America in 1960, the American Ceramic Society in 1964, the Geochemical Society in 1967, the Society of Economic Geologists in 1971, and the Geophysical Society of America. He was a fellow of the Geological Society of America, the Mineralogical Society of America, the American Association for the Advancement of Science, the American Geophysical Union and the American Ceramic Society. He was elected as a member of the National Academy of Engineering in 1968 for "advances in ceramics, slag, mineral, and steel technologies". He was also an honorary member of the Canadian Ceramic Society and a member of the National Science Foundation.

== Personal life and death ==
Osborn married Jean McLeod Thomson on August 12, 1939. Together, they had two children, James and Ian.

Osborn died on January 19, 1998, at his home in State College, Pennsylvania. He was interred at Centre County Memorial Park in Centre County, Pennsylvania.

== Awards ==
Osborn received an honorary Doctor of Science degree from Alfred University in 1965 and an honorary Doctor of Science degree from Ohio State University in 1972. He was awarded the Mineralogical Society of America's Roebling Medal in 1972. Osborn was awarded the American Ceramic Society's Albert Victor Bleininger Memorial Award in 1976.
