= Kishwaukee =

Kishwaukee may refer to:

- Kishwaukee, Illinois
- Kishwaukee College
- Kishwaukee River
- USS Kishwaukee (AOG-9)
