= Walter R. Hibbard Jr. =

American metallurgist

11th Director of the U.S. Bureau of Mines
- In office December 1, 1965 – April 1, 1968
- Preceded by: Marling J. Ankeny
- Succeeded by: John F. O'Leary

Personal details
- Born: January 20, 1918 Bridgeport, Connecticut, U.S.
- Died: February 24, 2010 (aged 92) St. Augustine, Florida, U.S.
- Spouse(s): Charlotte Tracy (died 1970) Louise
- Children: 3
- Education: Wesleyan University; Yale University (PhD)
- Occupation: metallurgist; educator
- Military career
- Allegiance: United States
- Branch: United States Navy
- Rank: Lieutenant
- Conflicts: World War II

Walter R. Hibbard Jr (January 20, 1918 – February 24, 2010) was an American metallurgist, a distinguished professor at Virginia Polytechnic Institute and State University and the 11th director of the U.S. Bureau of Mines in President Johnson's administration.

== Early life ==
Walter R. Hibbard Jr. was born on January 20, 1918, in Bridgeport, Connecticut. He received a bachelor's degree in chemistry from Wesleyan University in 1939. He then graduated from Yale University in 1942 with a PhD in metallurgy.

== Career ==
Hibbard served as a lieutenant in the metallurgical section of the U.S. Navy's Bureau of Ships during World War II in Washington, D.C.

Hibbard then became an assistant professor of metallurgy at Yale University and was promoted five years later to associate professor. He also served as the director of the engineering division of the New Haven YMCA Junior College (precursor of the University of New Haven).

In 1951, Hibbard left Yale to become a research associate in materials processes at General Electric Research Laboratory in Schenectady, New York. He then served as an adjunct professor of metallurgical engineering at the Rensselaer Polytechnic Institute from 1952 to 1965. At General Electric, Hibbard became manager of alloy studies and then manager of General Electric's metallurgy and ceramic research.

On December 1, 1965, Hibbard was appointed by President Lyndon B. Johnson to become the director of the U.S. Bureau of Mines. He was confirmed by the U.S. Senate in January 1966. He remained in that role until April 1, 1968. Hibbard noted threats to the adequacy of the nation's mineral supplies and advocated for minerals policy for the United States.

In 1968, Hibbard joined the Owens-Corning Fiberglass Corporation as its vice president of research and development. He then became the vice president for technical service of Owens-Corning in Toledo, Ohio. In 1974, he returned to Washington, D.C., as the deputy director and specialist on fossil fuels with the Energy Research and Development Office of the Federal Energy Administration during the 1970s energy crisis.

In 1974, he left his role at the Federal Energy Administration to join the faculty of Virginia Tech. He was appointed as a distinguished professor of engineering. In 1977, he was named the first director of Virginia Coal and Energy Research, an interdisciplinary study and research facility at Virginia Tech created by the Virginia General Assembly on March 30, 1977. He retired in 1988.

== Personal life ==
Hibbard married Charlotte Tracy, who died in 1970. He later married Louise. He had one daughter and two sons: Diana, Douglas and Lawrence.

== Awards ==
He was a member of the National Academy of Engineering elected in 1966 "for metallurgy". The National Academy of Engineering said that Hibbard was "world renowned for his scholarship of metallurgy".

Hibbard was a fellow of the American Ceramic Society, American Academy of Arts and Sciences, American Association for the Advancement of Science, American Society for Metals and the Metallurgical Society of the American Institute of Mining, Metallurgical, and Petroleum Engineers (AIME).

He received the following awards:

- 1950 – Rossiter W. Raymond Award, AIME
- 1966 – honorary Doctor of Law degree from Michigan Technological University
- 1967 – James Douglas Gold Medal, AIME
- 1968 – honorary Doctor of Engineering degree from Montana College of Mineral Science and Technology
- 1971 – Henry Krumb Lecturer, AIME
