= Roger A. Markle =

American mining engineer (1933–2020)

15th Director of the U.S. Bureau of Mines
- In office September 1, 1978 – April 11, 1979
- Preceded by: Thomas V. Falkie
- Succeeded by: Lindsay D. Norman

Personal details
- Born: December 12, 1933 Sidney, Montana, U.S.
- Died: January 2020 (aged 86) Sun City, Arizona, U.S.
- Spouse: Mary E. (died 2014)
- Education: University of Alaska (BS); Stanford University (MS); University of Chicago (MBA)
- Occupation: mining engineer; executive
- Military career
- Branch: United States Navy

Roger A. Markle (December 12, 1933 – January 2020) was an American mining engineer and executive. He served as the 15th director of the U.S. Bureau of Mines. He later served as the president and vice chairman of Quaker State and the executive vice president of NERCO.

== Early life ==
Roger A. Markle was born on December 12, 1933, in Sidney, Montana to Forrest Markle. He attended a one-room schoolhouse up until eighth grade. He then attended Montana School of Mines for two years while working weekends at mines in Butte. He then moved to Fairbanks, Alaska and enrolled at the University of Alaska. Markle graduated from the University of Alaska with a Bachelor of Science in mining engineering in 1959. He graduated from Stanford University in 1965 with a Master of Science in mining management. He then graduated from the University of Chicago in 1971 with a Master of Business Administration.

== Career ==
Markle served in the U.S. Navy. He was honorably discharged in 1954.

Markle worked as a mill superintendent, chief mine engineer and then general superintendent with Alaska Mines & Minerals, Inc. from 1958 to 1961 at the Red Devil Mine near Red Devil, Alaska. He then worked as an instructor of adult education at the University of Alaska from 1962 to 1964. From 1965 to 1974, Markle worked at Standard Oil and its subsidiaries in varying positions relating to mining. He started as a project manager in Denver and ended as a manager of mine development. From 1974 to 1978, he served as the president of the western division of the Valley Camp Coal Company.

In 1978, President Jimmy Carter nominated Markle as the director of the U.S. Bureau of Mines. He assumed the position on September 1, 1978, and resigned the post on April 11, 1979, for personal reasons. Lindsay D. Norman assumed the role of acting director following his resignation. In 1979, he returned to the Valley Camp Coal Company, which was then owned by Quaker State, as a director, president, and chief executive officer. He was named president of Quaker State in 1982. In January 1988, Markle was named vice chairman. He served as president until May 1988. He retired from Quaker State in 1989.

In 1990, Markle became executive vice president of NERCO. He retired shortly before the company was sold to Kennecott Utah Copper in 1993.

== Personal life and death ==
Markle married Mary E. (d. 2014) around 1971. She had two daughters from a previous relationship.

After retiring, Markle and his wife lived in Vancouver, Washington, Atlantic Beach, North Carolina and, finally, Sun City, Arizona. Markle died in January 2020 in Sun City.

== Legacy ==
Between 2014 and 2020, Markle gave $2.1 million to create the Roger A. Markle Climate Change Adaptation Endowment at the University of Alaska. He created the endowment to support people living in the Arctic that may be impacted by climate change.
