= David Weintraub (official) =

American civil servant (1904–1969)

David Weintraub (1904–1969) was an official of the government of the United States.

Weintraub was born in 1904 in the town of Kozłów, which was then part of Austria-Hungary (now Kozliv, Ukraine). He was Jewish. He immigrated to the United States when he was 17, and became naturalized as an American citizen at the age of 22.

In the mid-1930s he headed the New Deal Works Project Administration's National Research Project. In the 1940s Weintraub moved to the United States Department of State, becoming head of the Office of Foreign Relief and Rehabilitation Operations. He joined the professional staff of the United Nations Relief and Rehabilitation Administration (UNRRA) and United Nations Division of Economic Stability and Development. During the House Un-American Activities Committee, he was questioned by the American government and was branded as a Communist.

In later years Weintraub was Chairman of the Trinidad and Tobago Industrial Development Corporation.

== Select publications ==
- David Weintraub and Harold L. Posner. National Research Project on Reemployment Opportunities and Recent Changes in Industrial Techniques. Published 1937.
- David Weintraub and Harold L. Posner. Unemployment and Increasing Productivity. Published 1937.
- David Weintraub. Effects of Current and Prospective Technological Developments Upon Capital Formation. Published 1939.
- David Weintraub, O.E. Kiessling, H.O. Rogers, John W. Finch. Technology Employment and Output Per Man in Petroleum and Natural-Gas Production. Published 1939.
- David Weintraub. Incentives to Foreign Investors in Trinidad and Tobago. Published 1959.
