= Mount Olivet United Methodist Church =

Methodist church in Virginia, US

Coordinates: 38°54′23.3″N 77°7′6.9″W

Mount Olivet United Methodist Church from Glebe Road

Mount Olivet United Methodist Church is a United Methodist Church located in Arlington County, Virginia. The church occupies the oldest church site in continuous use in Arlington County. The church and its cemetery are located at the southwest corner of Glebe Road and 16th Street North.

== History ==
=== 19th century ===
The Mount Olivet cemetery adjacent to the church is part of the original land deeded in trust in 1854. On March 12, 1855, John B. Brown and his wife Cornelia, and William Marcy and his wife Ann, resolved an ownership dispute over the church site property by each deeding that property in trust for a Methodist Protestant Church meetinghouse and burial ground. George C. Wunder, the owner of a nearby farm, made the first contribution to the church building fund in the amount of one hundred dollars (equivalent to more than eight thousand dollars today).

The cornerstone for the first building, a two story structure approximately 35 feet by 50 feet in size, was laid in 1855 and the building was completed in 1860, the year before the American Civil War began. In the summer of 1861, Union soldiers retreating from the First Battle of Bull Run encamped near the church and commandeered it for use as a hospital and then a stable. The soldiers later dismantled the church building to provide firewood and other supplies for the war effort, but a tiny congregation persevered and built another small meetinghouse on the site in 1870.

The 1870 meetinghouse was remodeled in 1875 and remained until 1897 when a larger church was built.

=== 20th century ===
In 1920, an education wing was added to the south side of the building and the bell tower and vestibule were relocated. After World War II, rapid population growth in the area spurred the construction of a larger church. Construction completed in 1949 added a new sanctuary, a social hall and a kitchen, as well as the stylized tall steeple that adorns the church to this day.

Also in 1920, the burial records of the church were destroyed in a fire, and information on existing grave sites is largely limited to what is inscribed on the tombstones. Among those buried in the Mount Olivet cemetery is Sue Landon Vaughan, one of the founders of Decoration Day, now Memorial Day, who in 1865 began the practice of decorating the graves of both Confederate and Union who were killed in the American Civil War.

In 1954, a two-story north wing with a chapel, church offices and classrooms was added. In 1962, the sanctuary was expanded and a two story south wing with additional classrooms was added. Most recently, construction in 1997 renovated the sanctuary, added an elevator for handicapped access, expanded the chancel, created a gathering space, renovated and added classrooms, and created a Columbarium.

=== 21st century ===
On January 24, 2004, the Arlington County Board issued a proclamation commemorating the church’s 150th anniversary and recognizing that “Mount Olivet’s members continue to play an active and vital role in the Arlington community, contributing human and financial resources to a myriad of charitable organizations in Arlington and other communities throughout the country and the world”.

As of June 30, 2007, the church had a membership of 1,262 and an average Sunday worship attendance of 411.

== Notable interments ==
- T. S. Ary (1925–2009), director of the U.S. Bureau of Mines
- Sue Landon Vaughan (1835–1911), one of the founders of Memorial Day

== Name ==
Tradition says that Oliver Cox, a young minister in 1854 when the first meetinghouse was built, named the church after the Mount of Olives, the site east of Jerusalem where the Bible says that Jesus preached to his disciples.
