= Roy Hitt =

American baseball player (1884–1956)

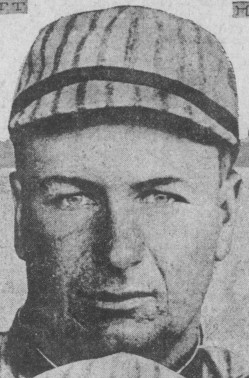
- Pitcher
- Born: June 22, 1884; Carleton, Nebraska, U.S.
- Died: February 8, 1956 (aged 71); Pomona, California, U.S.
- Batted: Left Threw: Left

MLB debut
- April 27, 1907, for the Cincinnati Reds

Last MLB appearance
- October 5, 1907, for the Cincinnati Reds

MLB statistics
- Win–loss record: 6–10
- Earned run average: 3.40
- Strikeouts: 63
- Stats at Baseball Reference

Teams
- Cincinnati Reds (1907)

Roy Wesley "Rhino" Hitt (June 22, 1884 – February 8, 1956) was an American pitcher in Major League Baseball. He played for the Cincinnati Reds in 1907 and also had a long career in the Pacific Coast League. He stood at 5 ft 10 in (1.78 m) and weighed 200 lbs.

== Career ==
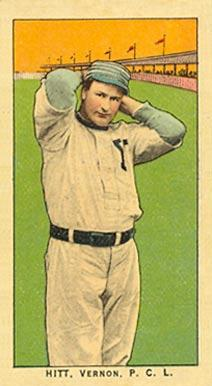
A baseball card depicting Hitt

Nicknamed "Rhino" because "his shape reminded people of a rhinoceros," Hitt was born in Carleton, Nebraska. He started his professional baseball career in 1903, with the Oakland Oaks of the Pacific Coast League and joined the San Francisco Seals the following season. In 1905, he went 25–14 with a 1.79 earned run average. In 1906, he was the ace of the Seals pitching staff, going a career-high 403.2 innings in the long PCL season and winning a career-high 31 games.

Hitt was acquired by the National League's Cincinnati Reds for the 1907 season. In that year's Spalding's Official Base Ball Guide, it was reported that, "San Francisco's star pitcher, Roy Hitt, will go to Cincinnati ... there is little danger of him falling." Hitt cracked the Reds' starting rotation that year but was not one of their better pitchers; he went just 6–10. It was his only season in the major leagues.

After a short stint in the American Association, Hitt returned to the Pacific Coast League in 1909, with the Vernon Tigers. He immediately became the ace of the Tigers' staff, leading the team in innings pitched and ERA. In 1910, he had one of his best seasons, going 26–17 with a career-low 1.68 ERA in 402.2 innings. Hitt stayed with the Tigers until 1916. He won over 20 games each year for five straight years (1910–1914), and he ended his organized baseball career with 206 minor league wins to go along with his 6 major league ones.

Hitt died in 1956, at the age of 71. He was inducted into the Pacific Coast League Hall of Fame in 2004.
