= Royd R. Sayers =

American physician

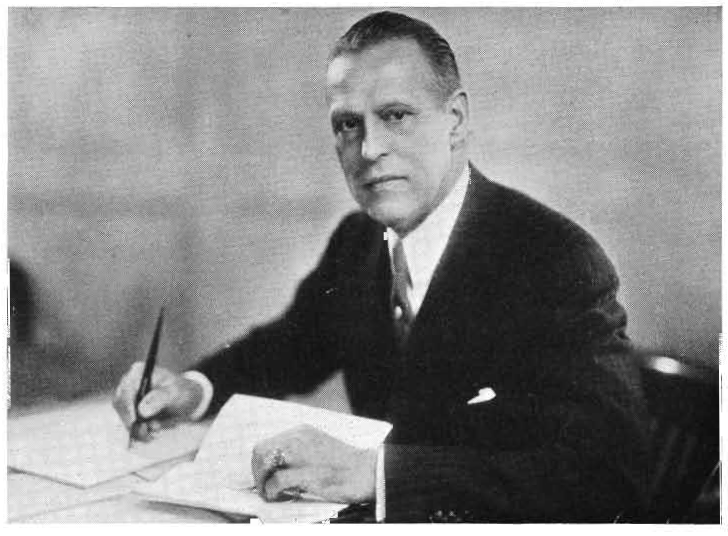
- Sayers in 1940

7th Director of the U.S. Bureau of Mines
- In office May 27, 1940 – July 14, 1947
- Preceded by: John W. Finch
- Succeeded by: James Boyd

Personal details
- Born: Royd Ray Sayers; October 25, 1885 Crothersville, Indiana, U.S.
- Died: April 23, 1965 (aged 79)
- Education: Indiana University Bloomington (BA, MA); University of Buffalo (MD)
- Occupation: Physician

Royd R. Sayers (October 25, 1885 – April 23, 1965) was an American physician and industrial hygienist. He served as the Chief of the Division of Industrial Hygiene at the National Institute of Health and the 7th director of the U.S. Bureau of Mines.

== Early life ==
Royd Ray Sayers was born on October 25, 1885, in Crothersville, Indiana. He graduated with a Bachelor of Arts and Master of Arts from the Indiana University Bloomington in 1907. He then served as a professor of electrochemistry at the University of Buffalo from 1911 to 1913. He graduated with a Doctor of Medicine from the University of Buffalo in 1914.

== Career ==
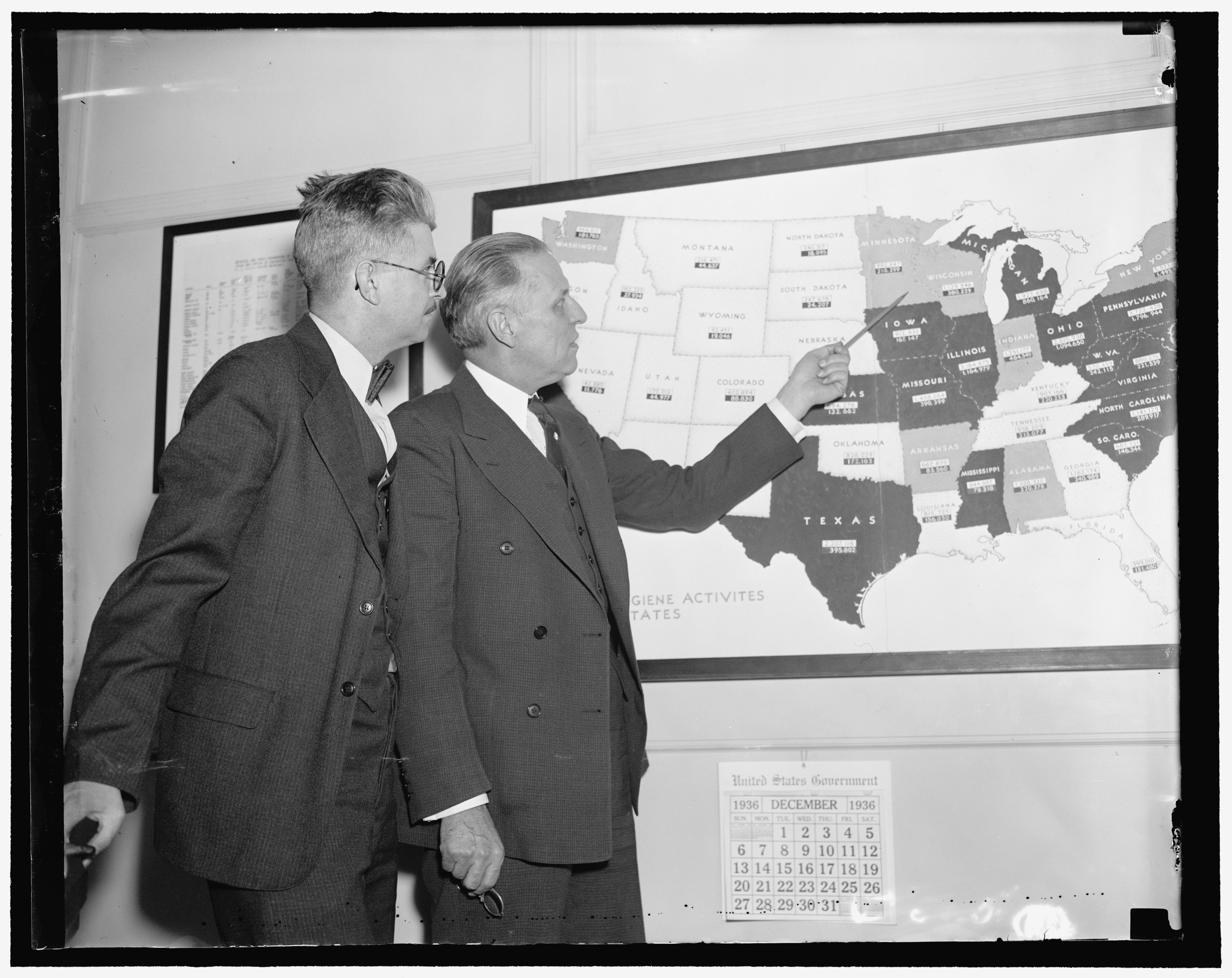
Dr. John W. Miller and Dr. Sayers working at the Division of Industrial Hygiene, 1936

Sayers joined the U.S. Public Health Service in 1914 and would remain with the service until 1948. In the 1930s, he designed the city of Baltimore, Maryland's industrial hygiene program. In January 1941, he was appointed as a medical director of the U.S. Public Health Service.

In 1917, Sayers became the Chief Surgeon and Chief of the Health and Safety Branch of the U.S. Bureau of Mines. He remained in this role until 1933 when he became the Chief of the Division of Industrial Hygiene at the National Institute of Health. He left this role in 1940.

On May 27, 1940, Sayers replaced John W. Finch as the director of the U.S. Bureau of Mines. He held this role until July 14, 1947. He then returned to working at the U.S. Public Health Service as a medical director. From September 20, 1950, until around 1960, Sayers served as the Senior Medical Supervisor of Occupational Diseases for the Baltimore City Health Department.

Sayers also served as president of the American Occupational Medical Association from 1937 to 1938.

== Personal life ==
Sayers purchased the Robert E. Lee Boyhood Home in Alexandria, Virginia in 1932 from the heirs of Emmuella Burson. The Sayers worked to renovate and restore the property, and opened it up for private and public tours. The Sayers were neighbors with labor leader John L. Lewis. The Sayers sold the property in 1941, and then lived in the Lyceum in Alexandria and later the His Lordship's Kindness property in Prince George's County, Maryland.

== Death ==
Sayers died on April 23, 1965.

== Awards ==
In 1941, Sayers was awarded the Lifetime Achievement in Occupational and Environmental Medicine Award by the American Occupational Medical Association (now the American College of Occupational and Environmental Medicine).
