= Carolynn Reid-Wallace =

American academic administrator (born 1942)

13th President of Fisk University
- In office 2001 – October 2003
- Preceded by: John L. Smith
- Succeeded by: Hazel R. O'Leary

Assistant Secretary of Education for Postsecondary Education
- In office December 3, 1991 – 1993
- President: George H. W. Bush
- Preceded by: Leonard L. Haynes III
- Succeeded by: David Longanecker

Personal details
- Born: June 26, 1942 (age 83) Williamsburg, Virginia, U.S.
- Children: 1
- Education: Fisk University; Adelphi University; George Washington University

Carolynn Reid-Wallace (born June 26, 1942) is an American academic administrator who served as president of Fisk University from 2001 to 2003. She was the assistant secretary of education for postsecondary education from 1991 to 1993.

== Life ==
Reid-Wallace was born to Nathaniel H. Reid Jr. and Mary Reid on June 26, 1942, in Williamsburg, Virginia. In 1960, she graduated from Bruton Heights \ School. She graduated from Fisk University with a B.A. in speech and drama in 1964. She earned an M.A. in dramatic literature from Adelphi University in 1965.

Reid-Wallace taught the humanities at Talladega College, Howard University, Grinnell College and Bowie State University. At Bowie State University, she served as the dean of instruction from 1974 to 1975, dean of undergraduate studies from 1975 to 1976, dean of the college and vice president for academic affairs from 1976 to 1978, and as the acting chief executive from 1977 to 1978. From 1979 to 1980, she was the director of the NAFEO/NEH humanities program. She completed a Ph.D. in English and American literature at the Columbian College of Arts and Sciences at George Washington University in 1981. Her dissertation was titled, Jean Toomer: Death on the Modern Desert. Reid-Wallace was the director for the National Association for Equal Opportunity in Higher Education Clearinghouse (NAFEO) from 1981 to 1982. In 1982, Reid-Wallace became the at the National Endowment for the Humanities. In 1987, U.S. president Ronald Reagan appointed her as a member of the National Council on the Humanities, succeeding Samuel DuBois Cook. Her term was set to expire on January 26, 1992. She served as the vice chancellor for academic affairs of City University of New York from 1987 to 1991.

On September 9, 1991, U.S. president George H. W. Bush nominated Reid-Wallace as the assistant secretary of education for postsecondary education. She was sworn in on December 3, 1991. She succeeded Leonard L. Haynes III. As secretary, she managed a budget of $12.5 billion of college grants, student loans, and the Federal Work-Study program. Her staff included 1,2500 employees. In 1993, she was succeeded by David Longanecker. Upon leaving the United States Department of Education, she was the senior vice president for education and programming at the Corporation for Public Broadcasting. In 1999, she was one of five finalist to become chancellor of Indiana University Northwest. In 2001, Reid-Wallace became the first female president of Fisk University. She resigned in October 2003 amid conflicts with the board of trustees regarding revitalization and diversity.

== Personal life ==
Reid married law student Addison Wallace. They moved to Washington, D.C. He died in 1970 from cancer when Reid was eight months pregnant with their first child.
