= Marling J. Ankeny =

American mining engineer (died 1977)

10th Director of the U.S. Bureau of Mines
- In office July 20, 1956 – December 31, 1964
- Preceded by: John J. Forbes
- Succeeded by: Walter R. Hibbard Jr.

Personal details
- Born: Marling Jay Ankeny Carleton, Nebraska, U.S.
- Died: April 24, 1977 (aged 75) Baltimore, Maryland, U.S.
- Spouse: Eleanor Mae Kulp
- Children: 2
- Education: Carnegie Tech
- Occupation: mining engineer
- Military career
- Allegiance: United States
- Branch: United States Navy; U.S. Navy Reserve
- Rank: Lieutenant commander
- Conflicts: World War II; Invasion of Normandy

Marling J. Ankeny (died April 24, 1977) was an American mining engineer. He served as the 10th director of the U.S. Bureau of Mines.

== Early life ==
Marling Jay Ankeny was born in Carleton, Nebraska, to Thomas A. Ankeny. He grew up in Sabetha, Kansas. His family was originally from Pennsylvania. After graduating high school, Ankeny moved with his parents to Johnstown, Pennsylvania.

Ankeny graduated from Carnegie Tech in 1934.

== Career ==
Ankeny worked in coal mines around Johnstown, Pennsylvania. He joined the U.S. Bureau of Mines as a coal mine operator in 1934. He worked as a senior mining engineer from 1942 to 1947.

Ankeny served as a lieutenant commander in the U.S. Navy during World War II. He participated in the Invasion of Normandy. He also served in the U.S. Navy Reserve.

He then served as the chief of the Coal Inspection Branch from 1948 to 1952. Ankeny became the safety director of the Bituminous Coal Operators' Association in 1952.

Ankeny was nominated by President Dwight D. Eisenhower as director of the U.S. Bureau of Mines. He was appointed on July 20, 1956, replacing acting director Thomas H. Miller, who had served since John J. Forbes retirement in November 1955. He served as director until his retirement on December 31, 1964.

Ankeny then moved to Lusby, Maryland, and became a consultant to coal companies, as well as the Ministry of Mines in New Zealand. He worked on mine disaster investigation and mine safety laws.

== Personal life ==
Ankeny was married to Eleanor Mae Kulp. Together, they had two daughters, Eleanor and Jacqueline.

Ankeny was known as "Mark" by his contemporaries.

== Death ==
Ankeny died on April 24, 1977, at the age of 75, at the University of Maryland Medical Center in Baltimore, Maryland.
