= Technical Report Archive & Image Library =

National collaborative project

Technical Report Archive & Image Library (TRAIL) is a national collaborative project initiated by the University of Arizona and the Greater Western Library Alliance (GWLA). It is now part of the Global Resources Network of the Center for Research Libraries (CRL), in cooperation with more than 50 partner institutions and personal members. TRAIL's purpose is to digitize, preserve, and make openly available technical reports published by agencies of the United States government (initially limited to those before 1975, but expanded in 2015 to remove the date restriction). Technical reports often contain detailed information not published elsewhere, but can be difficult to find.

From 2012 to 2019, the collection grew from 28,000 to more than 80,000 reports. Material is currently available from a number of current and former United States government agencies, including report series from the Atomic Energy Commission, Bureau of Mines, National Bureau of Standards, and National Advisory Committee for Aeronautics.

== History ==
TRAIL started as a pilot project to digitize, preserve and make accessible a small collection of government agency technical reports, both as proof of concept and to work through technical and logistical issues. The University of Arizona submitted a proposal to Greater Western Library Alliance (GWLA) for a technical report digitization pilot and received funding in early 2006 to begin the project in collaboration with CRL. Led by Maliaca Oxnam of the University of Arizona, the GWLA/CRL Federal Technical Reports Task Force created the appropriate metadata schema, established a pilot search interface at the University of Hawaii and scanned the first complete series, the Monograph Series of the National Bureau of Standards.

TRAIL is now part of the Global Resource Network (GRN) within CRL.

== Digitized series ==
The list of digitized series also includes decisions on series not digitized or considered. Decisions are current and subject to future reviews.

Completely digitized series include:

- National Bureau of Standards Applied Mathematic Series
- National Bureau of Standards Building Materials and Structures Reports (C 13.9:)
- National Bureau of Standard Building Science Series
- United States Bureau of Mines Economic Papers
- United States Bureau of Mines Mineral Issues
- United States Bureau of Mines Miners' Circular
- United States Bureau of Mines Technical Progress Reports

Many other series are in progress, for example:

- United States Coast and Geodetic Survey United States Earthquakes [1928–62] [1963-68] (C 4.25/2:)
- National Advisory Committee for Aeronautics Aircraft Circulars
- United States Fish and Wildlife Service Technical Papers

== Access ==
The search interface is hosted by the University of Washington and searches all TRAIL content found at HathiTrust and UNT.

== Awards ==
2012

- John B. Phillips won GODORT's James Bennett Childs Award and his involvement with TRAIL was mentioned among his contributions to the field.
- Maliaca Oxnam won the Homer I. Bernhardt Distinguished Service Award for creating, crafting, and successfully launching the TRAIL project among her other professional achievements.
- Maliaca Oxnam won the first annual Elsevier Library Connect Charleston Conference Award for first time presenters. Oxnam presented on TRAIL at the 2012 Charleston Conference at a session entitled "Moving Technical Reports Forward: New Roles for Libraries & Librarians".

2011

- Tim Byrne won the American Library Association GODORT's James Bennett Childs Award and his involvement with TRAIL was mentioned among his contributions to the field.

2010

- Maliaca Oxnam was honored with the University of Arizona Outstanding University Achievement Award "...for her leadership of the Libraries' TRAIL, or Technical Report Archive & Image Library, Project."
- Maliaca Oxnam won the LexisNexis/GODORT/ALA Documents to the People Award for her role in directing TRAIL.

== Member institutions ==
Arizona State University / University of Arizona / University of Arkansas / Baylor University / California Institute of Technology / University of California, Berkeley / University of California, Los Angeles / University of California, Riverside / University of California, San Diego / University of Cincinnati / Colorado School of Mines / University of Colorado / Georgia Institute of Technology / Harvard University / University of Illinois at Urbana-Champaign / Indiana University / Iowa State University / University of Iowa / Johns Hopkins University / Kansas State University / Los Alamos National Laboratory / University of Massachusetts Amherst / Massachusetts Institute of Technology / University of Michigan / University of Nevada, Las Vegas / University of New Hampshire / University of New Mexico / New York University / University of North Texas / Northwestern University / University of Notre Dame / Ohio State University / Oklahoma State University / Oregon State University / University of Pennsylvania / Pennsylvania State University / Princeton University / Purdue University / Rice University / Stanford University / Syracuse University / University of Texas at Austin / Texas A & M University / Texas Tech University / University of Texas at San Antonio / United States Government Publishing Office / Utah State University / Virginia Tech / Washington State University / University of Washington / University of Wisconsin / University of Wyoming / Yale University
