= Hazel R. O'Leary =

American government official and university administrator (born 1937)

Hazel O'Leary
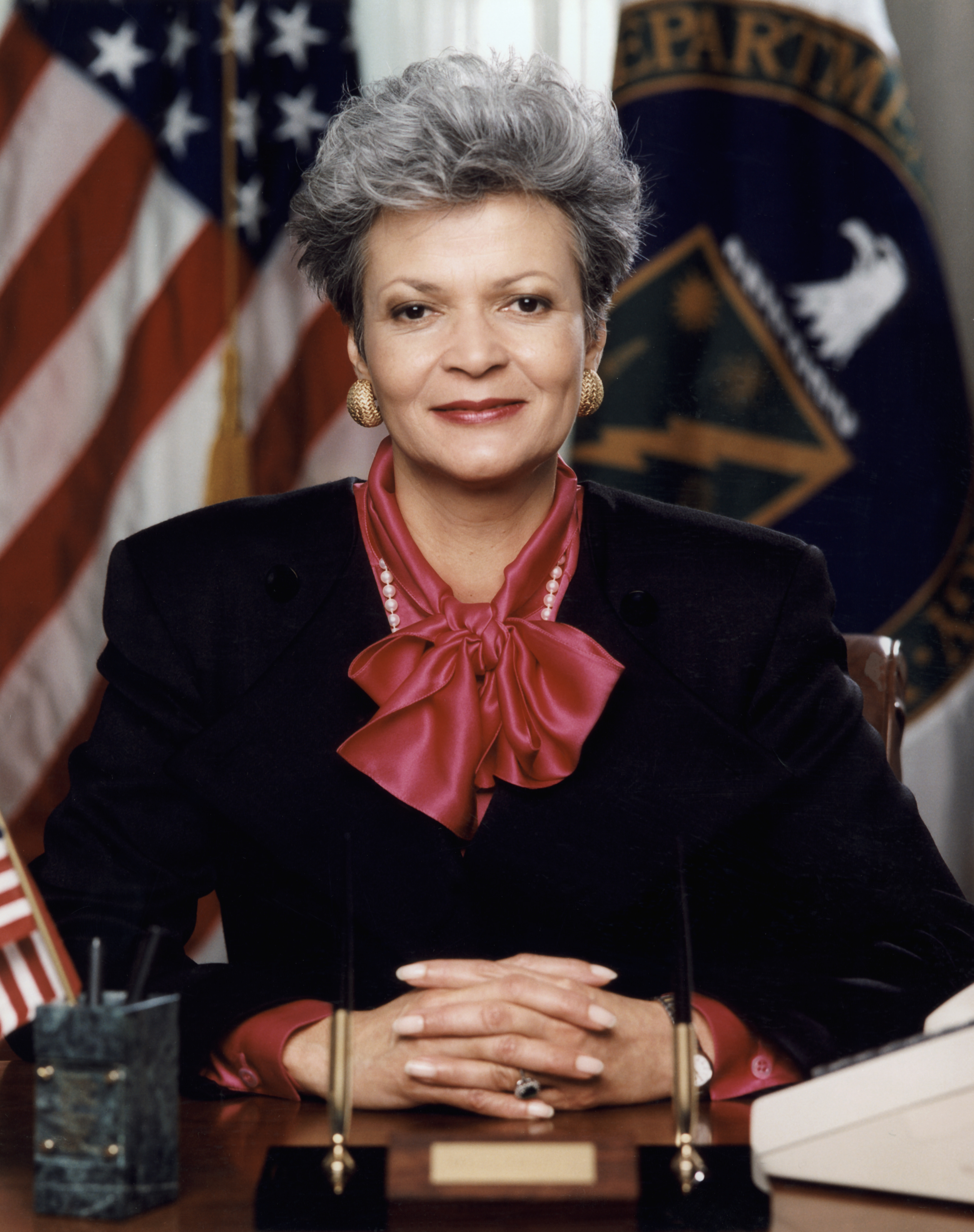

14th President of Fisk University
- In office July 13, 2004 – January 31, 2013
- Preceded by: Carolynn Reid-Wallace
- Succeeded by: James Williams

7th United States Secretary of Energy
- In office January 22, 1993 – January 20, 1997
- President: Bill Clinton
- Deputy: Bill White; Charles B. Curtis
- Preceded by: James D. Watkins
- Succeeded by: Federico Peña

Personal details
- Born: Hazel Reid; May 17, 1937 (age 89) Newport News, Virginia, U.S.
- Party: Democratic
- Spouse(s): Carl Rollins (divorced) Max Robinson (annulled) John O'Leary (m. 1980; died 1987)
- Children: 1
- Education: Fisk University (BA); Rutgers University, Newark (LLB)

Hazel Reid O'Leary (born May 17, 1937) is an American lawyer, politician, and university administrator who served as the 7th United States secretary of energy from 1993 to 1997. A member of the Democratic Party, O'Leary was the first woman and first African American to hold that post. She also served as the 14th president of Fisk University from 2004 to 2013, a historically black college and her alma mater. O'Leary's tenure at Fisk came amid financial difficulty for the school, during which time she increased enrollment and contentiously used the school's art collection to raise funds.

O'Leary received her bachelor's degree from Fisk before earning her Bachelor of Laws degree from Rutgers School of Law. O'Leary worked as a prosecutor in New Jersey and then in a private consulting/accounting firm before joining the Carter administration in the newly created Department of Energy. O'Leary returned to the private sector in 1981 but rejoined the government as secretary of energy under President Bill Clinton. During her tenure, she declassified documents detailing how the United States had conducted secret testing on the effects of radiation on unsuspecting American citizens. She also received criticism for excessive spending on international trips while in office.

== Early life and education ==
Hazel Reid was born in Newport News, Virginia. Her parents, Russel E. Reid and Hazel Reid, were both physicians. They divorced when she was 18 months old. Her father and stepmother, a teacher named Mattie Pullman Reid, raised Hazel and her older sister Edna Reid, primarily in the East End neighborhood. Hazel attended school in a segregated school system in Newport News for eight years. She and her sister were then sent to live with an aunt in Essex County, New Jersey, and attend Arts High School, an integrated school. She earned a bachelor's degree at Fisk University in Nashville in 1959. She then married Carl Rollins and had a son before returning to school and earning her Bachelor of Laws degree from Rutgers Law School in Newark in 1966.

== Career ==
=== Early career ===
O'Leary worked as a prosecutor in New Jersey on organized crime cases, later becoming an assistant attorney general for the state. In 1969, after obtaining a divorce, O'Leary moved to Washington, D.C., where she joined the consulting/accounting firm Coopers & Lybrand. During the Carter administration, O'Leary was appointed assistant administrator of the Federal Energy Administration, general counsel of the Community Services Administration, and administrator of the Economic Regulatory Administration at the newly created Department of Energy, where she met Deputy Secretary of Energy John F. O'Leary. They married on April 24, 1980.

After Carter lost the 1980 election, the O'Learys established the consulting firm O'Leary & Associates in Morristown, New Jersey, where she served as vice president and general counsel. After Jack died of cancer in 1987, she moved to Minnesota. From 1989 to 1993, O'Leary worked as an executive vice president of the Northern States Power Company, a Minnesota-based public utility.

=== Secretary of Energy ===
In a press conference on December 21, 1992, held in Little Rock, Arkansas, then President-elect Bill Clinton announced his intention to nominate O'Leary as secretary of energy. Clinton officially made the nomination on January 20, 1993, and the Senate confirmed O'Leary by unanimous consent the next day. O'Leary was the first woman and first African American to serve as energy secretary. She was also the first secretary of that department to have worked for an energy company. At the time she led the Department of Energy, it had an annual budget of $18 billion and approximately 18,000 employees.

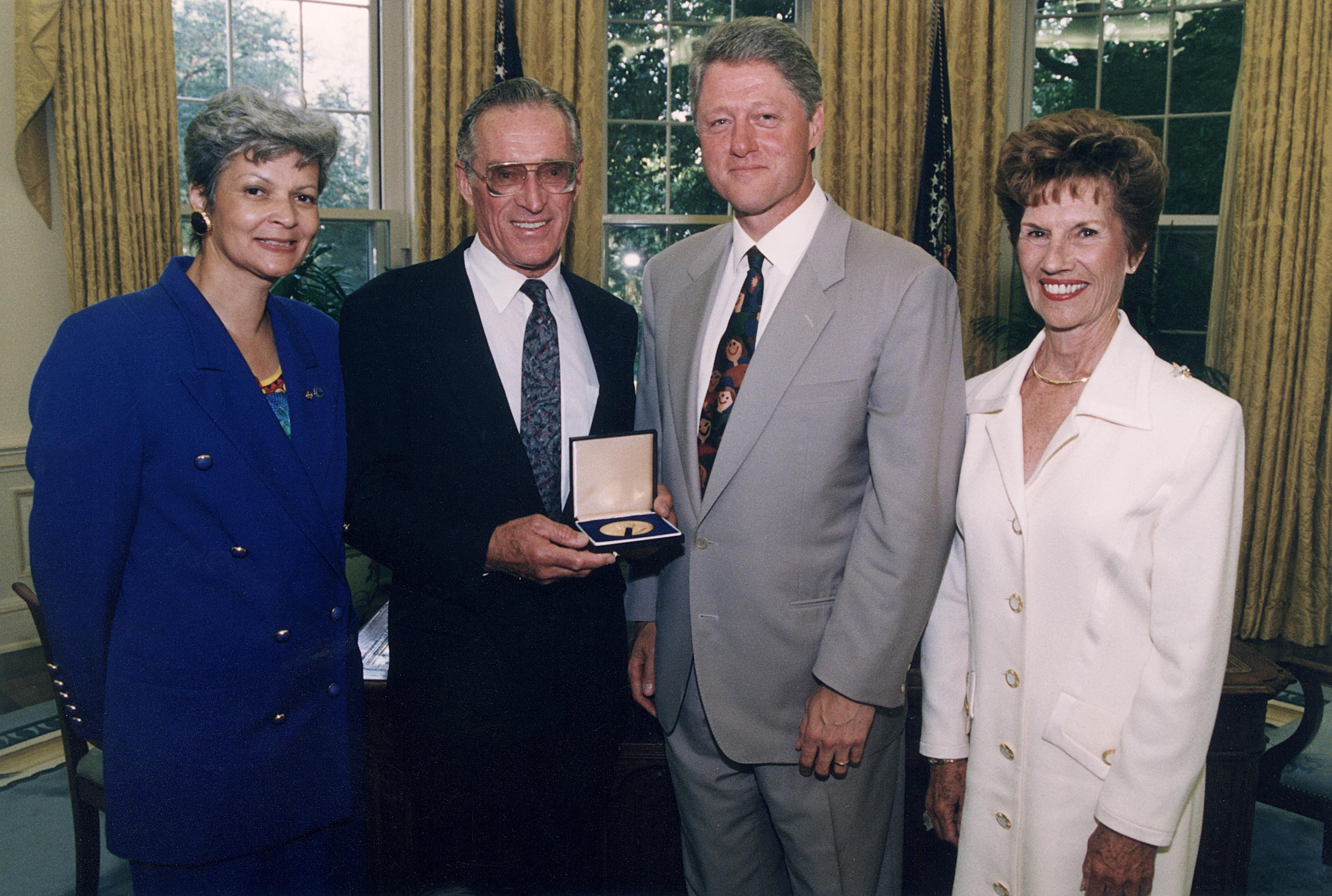
Left to right: Secretary of Energy Hazel R. O'Leary, John S. Foster, President Bill Clinton, and Mrs. John Foster

O'Leary challenged the way the department had traditionally been run, particularly its focus on developing and testing nuclear weapons. During her tenure, the size of the Department of Energy was reduced by a third. It was also a target for Republicans who wanted it eliminated. While reducing the size of the department overall, O'Leary shifted resources toward efficient and renewable energy sources, a priority of the Clinton administration.

In this position, O'Leary won praise for declassifying old Department of Energy documents, including Cold War-era records that showed the U.S. government had used American citizens as guinea pigs in human radiation experiments, as had long been rumored. Clinton issued Executive Order 12891, which created the Advisory Committee on Human Radiation Experiments (ACHRE) to prevent such abuses of power. O'Leary also announced a $4.6 million settlement payment to the families of victims of past radiation experiments. Other declassified documents included facts about plutonium the United States had left in South Vietnam.

O'Leary also pushed to end nuclear testing in the United States. Her efforts resulted in Clinton signing a test ban on nuclear testing, a ban that other nations joined. Early in her tenure as secretary, O'Leary met with whistle-blowers who said they faced harassment for raising legitimate health and safety issues within the DOE. She announced a "zero tolerance" policy, prohibiting retaliation against whistle-blowers at nuclear plants.

O'Leary repeatedly faced criticism during her tenure. The DOE allocated $43,500 to a Washington firm to identify unfriendly media outlets, which White House Press Secretary Michael D. McCurry called "unacceptable." O'Leary claimed the allocation was made without her direct knowledge and defended the research as an attempt to study the efficacy of the department's messaging. A Government Accountability Office audit of travel criticized her for traveling too frequently and spending excessively on accommodations. She apologized to Congressional committees in 1996 for spending that exceeded limits on the funds appropriated to the agency for travel.

O'Leary resigned from her position effective January 20, 1997, explaining she did not wish to stay in the job more than four years. In 1997, Johnny Chung, a Democratic political donor, claimed that O'Leary had met with Chinese oil officials after he gave $25,000 to O'Leary's favorite charity, Africare, in 1995. In August of that year, Attorney General Janet Reno reviewed Chung's allegations to decide whether to appoint a special prosecutor to investigate O'Leary. Reno determined there was "no evidence" of wrongdoing by O'Leary and no basis for a further investigation. Some observers, including a lawyer for the Government Accountability Project, saw some fault in O'Leary's conduct but also saw racism and sexism in the way she was treated.

=== Post-government ===
After leaving the Clinton administration, O'Leary once again served as president of O'Leary & Associates, her consulting firm. She also sat on the board of the environmental engineering firm ICF Kaiser International. In 2000, she became president and chief operating officer of an investment banking firm, Blaylock & Partners. She left that firm in 2002.

==== Fisk University president ====
On July 13, 2004, O'Leary was selected and began work as president of her undergraduate alma mater, Fisk University, a historically black college in Nashville, Tennessee. She was officially installed as the university's 14th president on October 6, 2005. Before O'Leary's tenure, the university had tried unsuccessfully to increase its enrollment and experienced financial problems. In 2008, Fisk had an enrollment of 770 students and 264 faculty and staff members.

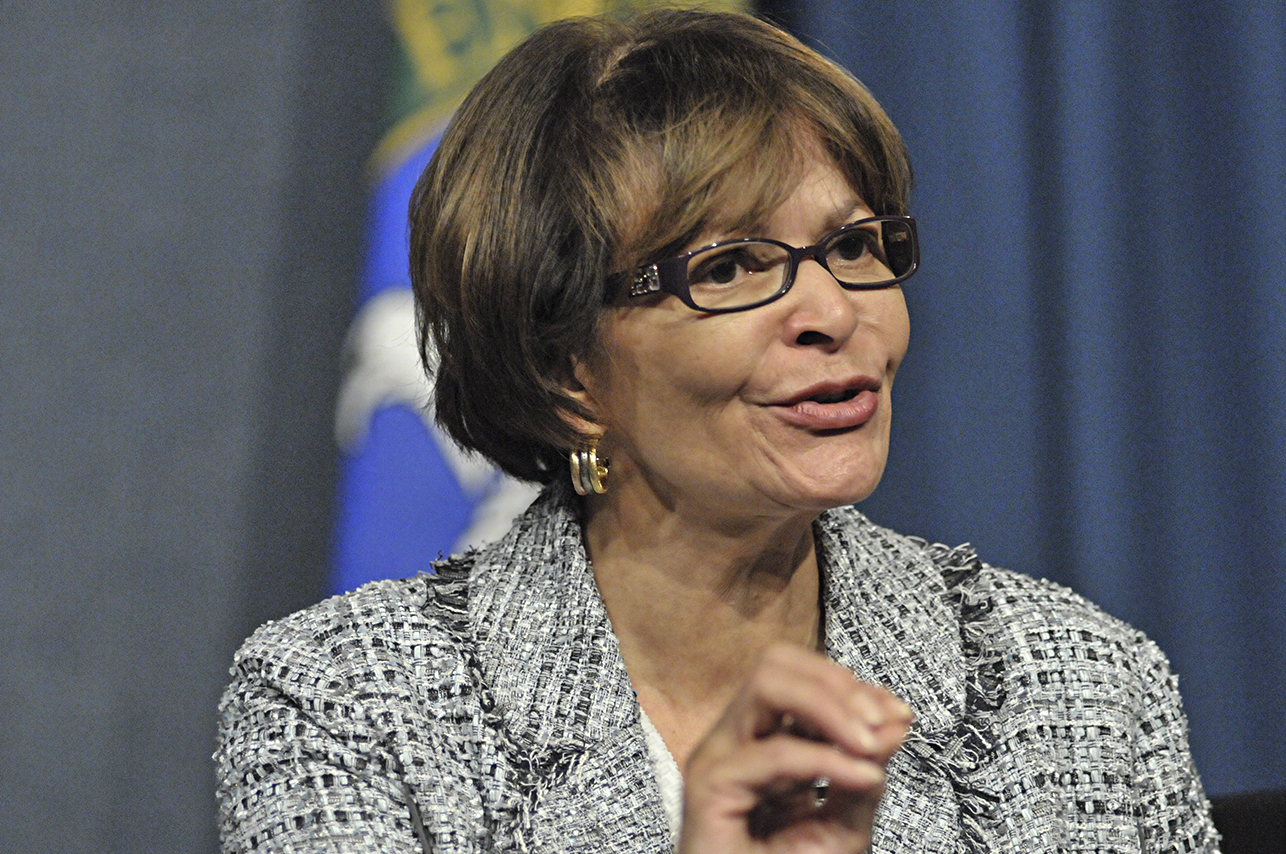
O'Leary speaks on September 24, 2013, at the Minorities in Energy Initiative Launch.

By 2011, Fisk's enrollment numbers improved, but the school was still operating with a loss in six of the previous nine years. These ongoing financial problems caused the Southern Association of Colleges and Schools Commission on Colleges to place Fisk on probation in 2010 over concerns for the university's finances and prospects. The probation ended in December 2013.

Under O'Leary's leadership, Fisk went to court in December 2005 seeking a ruling that it could sell a portion of the university's Alfred Stieglitz Collection. Stieglitz's widow Georgia O'Keeffe had bequeathed the collection to Fisk with restrictions on its sale. O'Leary intended to use the proceeds of the sale to fund a new academic building, endow professorships, and rebuild the school's endowment, which had been drawn down several times before her arrival. The Georgia O'Keeffe Foundation opposed the sale, and later the Tennessee State Attorney General opposed any sale of the artwork out of state. Ultimately, after seven years of legal battles, the school was able to reach a deal with Crystal Bridges Museum of American Art in Arkansas to share the collection. At the time the deal was finalized, O'Leary said the arrangement was essential to keeping the university open.

Amidst the public battle over attempts to sell the Alfred Stieglitz Collection, O'Leary quietly arranged to sell two other works of art, including a work by Florine Stettheimer. Fisk's board of trustees approved the sale in 2010 although it was not publicly disclosed until The New York Times reported it in 2016. O'Leary defended the decision to sell the artwork, saying it was done out of necessity amid financial difficulties.

In 2012, O'Leary announced that she would retire at the end of the calendar year. Her retirement was effective January 31, 2013. She was succeeded by H. James Williams.

=== Other affiliations ===
O'Leary has served as a director for Alchemix Corp. and CAMAC Energy. She also served on the board of directors for nonprofit organizations such as the Nashville Alliance for Public Education, the Nashville Business Community for the Arts, and the Arms Control Association, and as a trustee on boards of the World Wildlife Fund, Morehouse College, and The Andrew Young Center of International Development.

== Personal life ==
O'Leary has been married three times. Her first marriage to Carl G. Rollins, Jr., ended in divorce. The couple had a son, also named Carl, who became an attorney. O'Leary was briefly married to ABC News anchorman Max Robinson. In 1977, she met John F. O'Leary, then Deputy Secretary of Energy. They married on April 24, 1980, and remained married until his death from cancer in 1987.

In 1997, O'Leary joined a Presbyterian Church. She is a member of The Links.

== See also ==
- List of African-American United States Cabinet members
- List of female United States Cabinet members

Political offices
Preceded by James Watkins	United States Secretary of Energy; 1993–1997	Succeeded by Federico Peña
U.S. order of precedence (ceremonial)
Preceded by Henry Cisneros as Former U.S. Cabinet Member	Order of precedence of the United States as Former U.S. Cabinet Member	Succeeded by William J. Perry as Former U.S. Cabinet Member
