= Thomas V. Falkie =

American mining engineer (1934–2019)

14th Director of the U.S. Bureau of Mines
- In office March 1, 1974 – 1977
- Preceded by: Elburt F. Osborn
- Succeeded by: Roger A. Markle

Personal details
- Born: Thomas Victor Falkie; September 5, 1934 Mount Carmel, Pennsylvania, U.S.
- Died: November 1, 2019 (aged 85) Newton Square, Pennsylvania, U.S.
- Spouse: Jean Cecilia Broscius (died 2001)
- Children: 5
- Education: Pennsylvania State University (BS, MS, PhD)
- Occupation: engineer; educator; government official

Thomas Victor Falkie (September 5, 1934 – November 1, 2019) was an American mining engineer and educator. He served as the 14th director of the U.S. Bureau of Mines.

== Early life ==
Thomas Victor Falkie was born on September 5, 1934, in Mount Carmel, Pennsylvania to Victor and Aldona Falkie. Victor Falkie was a coal miner and Aldona Falkie was a factory worker. Falkie received three degrees in mining engineering: a Bachelor of Science in 1956, a Master of Science in 1958, and a PhD in 1961 from the Pennsylvania State University. Falkie was the first PhD recipient in the United States in the field of operations research/management science applications in mining engineering.

== Career ==
Falkie worked with the International Minerals and Chemical Corporation in Skokie, Illinois and Bartow, Florida from 1961 to 1969. He initially worked as an operations research engineer and then rose to become chief of operations planning, manager of special exploration and development projects, project control manager and production supervisor. He taught industrial engineering as an adjunct professor at the University of South Florida and served on the Industrial Advisory Committee at the University of Florida. He then served as a professor and head of the newly formed Department of Mineral Engineering at Pennsylvania State University from 1969 to 1974.

President Richard M. Nixon appointed served to serve as the director of the U.S. Bureau of Mines. He served in that role from March 1, 1974, to 1977. In 1977, he joined Berwind Natural Resources Company in Philadelphia, Pennsylvania. He served as president and chief executive officer from 1977 to 1998, chair of the board from 1998 to 2003, and then served on the board of directors until 2010.

Falkie served as the president of the Society for Mining, Metallurgy, and Exploration in 1985. He served as vice president of American Institute of Mining, Metallurgical, and Petroleum Engineers (AIME) from 1977 to 1978 and as president in 1988. He also served as president of the Joseph A. Holmes Safety Association from 1974 to 1977. He was elected to the National Academy of Engineering in 1989. He served on the board of directors of the National Mining Hall of Fame from 1989 to 2016, the board of directors of Foote Minerals Co. from 1984 to 1988, and the board of directors of Cyprus Amax Minerals from 1988 to 2000.

== Personal life and death ==
Falkie was married to Jean Cecilia Broscius (d. 2001) of Shamokin, Pennsylvania. Together, they had five children: Ann Marie, Thomas V. Falkie Jr., Lawrence W., Michael J. and Christine Mack.

He was known by his contemporaries as "Tom".

Falkie died on November 1, 2019, in Newton Square, Pennsylvania.

== Awards and legacy ==
Falkie was honored as an Alumni Fellow of Pennsylvania State University in 1986. In 1991, he received the AIME Erskine Ramsay Medal for "his notable achievements in coal mining resulting from his successful bridging of these three realms of activity: academics, government, and industry, and distinguishing himself in all of them". He received the Robert Stefanko Award for Distinguished Achievement in Mineral Engineering in 1995. In 2015, he received the AIME Charles F. Rand Memorial Gold Medal. Falkie was inducted into the National Mining Hall of Fame in 2017. In 2018, he was awarded the Mining and Metallurgical Society of America Gold Medal.

Falkie and his wife established the Thomas V. and Jean C. Falkie Faculty Fellowship in Mining Engineering at Pennsylvania State University in 1999.
