= Rhea Lydia Graham =

American geologist

19th Director of U.S. Bureau of Mines
- In office 1994–1996
- Preceded by: Herman Enzer (acting)
- Succeeded by: Bureau abolished

Personal details
- Born: August 11, 1952 (age 74) Terre Haute, Indiana, U.S.
- Spouse: Clifford Neal Dahm
- Children: 2
- Education: Bryn Mawr College (A.B.); Oregon State University (M.A.)
- Occupation: geologist; engineering geologist

Rhea Lydia Graham (born August 11, 1952) is an American retired geologist with a background in environmental consulting and engineering geology and was made the last director of the United States Bureau of Mines, as well as the first female as well as African-American director, by President Bill Clinton and the United States Senate in 1994.

== Early life ==
Graham was born in Terre Haute, Indiana on August 11, 1952. She graduated with a Bachelor of Arts in geology from Bryn Mawr College in Bryn Mawr, Pennsylvania in 1974 and later completed her Master of Arts in Oceanography at Oregon State University in 1977. While majoring in geological oceanography at Oregon State, she presented her thesis on April 11, 1977, titled “A Paleomagnetic Study of Recent Sediments in the Santa Barbara Basin”. Her thesis, approved by Jack Dymond, involved testing the sedimentary environment in the Santa Barbara Basin to see whether domizing effects on the magnetic grains dominate the paleomagnetic record.

== Career ==
=== Mining career ===
After graduating, Graham worked as a geophysicist at Exxon Company in Houston, Texas from 1977 to 1978. She then worked as an engineering geologist for CH2M Hill in Portland, Oregon from 1978 to 1983. She then worked as a geologist at the Forestry Sciences Research Laboratory in Corvallis, Oregon and as a private consultant from 1983 to 1984.

Graham then worked with Deuel & Associates in Albuquerque, New Mexico, a consulting firm, as a geologist from 1985 to 1987 and a manager from 1987 to 1988. She then worked as a regulatory compliance specialist at Ponderosa Products and a private consultant in RCRA compliance in 1988. From 1988 to 1991, she was a Senior Scientist at Science Applications International Corporation. This exposed her to the environmental issues that the U.S. Department of Energy were addressing at the time. She was also an advisor to the National Academy of Sciences. She later became the agency director for the Mining and Minerals Division of the state of New Mexico in 1991.

=== U.S. Bureau of Mines ===
Graham was elected as the 19th Director of the U.S. Bureau of Mines, following her nomination by President Bill Clinton in August 1994. The National Academy of Sciences also recommended her specifically for the position of Director of the U.S. Bureau of Mines.

On September 28, 1994, Rhea Lydia Graham's hearing regarding her nomination to become the Director of the U.S. Bureau of Mines of the Department of the Interior by President Clinton was held. At the time of the hearing, Lydia Graham was not a resident of the state of New Mexico, but had been living there since 1984. Her children were also born there.

She was the first woman to hold this position since the conception of the organization 84 years prior. She was appointed Director in 1994, succeeding acting director Herman Enzer, and held the position until 1996, when the Bureau was abolished.

=== Later career ===
After serving as Director, she returned to New Mexico. She specialized in water resources management with the Sandia Pueblo. She designed and coordinated outreach and collaboration for completion of the first State Water Plan. She then served in the U.S. Bureau of Reclamation in California. She coordinated a number of technical studies and coordinated with the U.S. Department of the Interior on a proposed settlement agreement of removing four dams on the Klamath River in Oregon and California. Then, she returned to New Mexico and worked on one final water resources management project. She worked on a voluntary operating agreement for New Mexico's largest storage reservoir.

Graham is a former president of the American Institute of Professional Geologist's New Mexico section, and holds numerous positions within American geological societies. These include the Geological Society of America, New Mexico Geological Society, and Association of Environmental & Engineering Geologists.

Graham currently resides in Albuquerque and has no longer been active in geology or been working since her retirement in May, 2016. Up until her retirement, she had the official title of a geologist and engineering geologist under the state of Oregon. As of now, she expresses interest in mentoring others and is part of the Geological Society of America Fellowship.

== Personal life ==
Graham is married to Clifford Neal Dahm and has two daughters.

== Publications ==
Graham contributed to "Some Effects of Slope Movements on River Channels", an accumulation of research on the effect of the size and volume of dam distribution on potential dam failure and the consequent release of water.

In 1996, under Graham's direction, the U.S. Bureau of Mines published the second edition of the “Dictionary of Mining, Mineral, and Related Terms”. This revised version updated the terminology which was needed due to the many changes such as technological advancements and environmental regulations, which have occurred since the first edition of this dictionary was initially published in 1968. Other contributions during her time as the Director for the U.S. Bureau of Mines include the publication of a report in January 1995, investigating the reliability of the smoke detectors used in mining, titled "Evaluation of Smoke Detectors for Mining Use".

Graham has co-authored the following scholarly papers:

- “Environmental Policy Law : Problems, Cases, and Readings”
- “Wasting away - An Exploration of Waste: What it is, how it happens, why we fear it, how to do it well, by Kevin Lynch”
- “The Complete Guide to the Hazardous Waste Regulations, 2nd Ed.”
