= Lindsay D. Norman =

American mining engineer

16th Director of the U.S. Bureau of Mines
- In office 1979 – March 1981
- Preceded by: Roger A. Markle
- Succeeded by: Robert C. Horton

Personal details
- Born: Lindsay D. Norman Jr. 1938 (age 87–88) Drexel Hill, Pennsylvania, U.S.
- Spouse: Linda
- Children: 5
- Education: University of Maryland (PhD)
- Occupation: mining engineer; educator

Lindsay D. Norman (born 1938) is an American mining engineer and educator. He served as the 16th director of the U.S. Bureau of Mines. He also worked as an executive for Jones and Laughlin Steel Company and Chase Manhattan Bank. He later served as president of Montana Technical Institute and Massachusetts Bay Community College.

== Early life ==
Lindsay D. Norman was born in 1938 in Drexel Hill, Pennsylvania. Norman was raised on a farm in Eastern Shore, Maryland. He attended the University of Maryland and graduated with a bachelor's degree in metallurgy and chemical engineering in 1960 and a master's degree in metallurgy and nuclear engineering. He also received a PhD in 1970 in materials science and physics from the University of Maryland.

== Career ==
Norman began his career at DuPont around 1961. He worked part-time for the U.S. Bureau of Mines as he was working on his master's degree.

Norman worked as an assistant director at the Bureau of Mines for five years. Norman was appointed by President Jimmy Carter as director of the Bureau of Mines in 1979. He served in that role until March 1981, when he was replaced by President Ronald Reagan.

After leaving the Bureau of Mines, Norman worked as vice president of the Jones and Laughlin Steel Company in Pittsburgh from 1981 to 1984. He later worked as a vice president and technical director at Chase Manhattan Bank from 1984 to 1986 in New York City.

Norman served as chancellor of Montana Technical Institute in Butte, Montana starting on July 1, 1986. He also served on the board of Pegasus Gold Inc. starting in 1987 and became the board chairman in August 1995. He resigned from Montana Tech when it merged into Montana University in 1998, and then served as a consultant for Montana University. Norman became president of Massachusetts Bay Community College in 1999. He retired in October 2004.

== Personal life ==
Norman is married to Linda, and together they have five children: Julie, Lindsay, Jessica, Jocelyn and David. His wife was a professor and department head at Montana Tech.

== Awards ==
Norman received the 1986 Engineering Distinguished Alumnus Award and the 1994 Engineering Centennial Medal from the University of Maryland.
