= Robert C. Horton =

American mining engineer

17th Director of the U.S. Bureau of Mines
- In office September 1981 – July 1987
- Preceded by: Lindsay D. Norman
- Succeeded by: T. S. Ary

Personal details
- Born: Robert Carlton Horton; July 25, 1926 Tonopah, Nevada, U.S.
- Died: March 15, 2014 (aged 87)
- Education: University of Nevada, Reno (BS)
- Occupation: Mining engineer
- Military career
- Branch: United States Navy; United States Navy Reserve
- Rank: lieutenant
- Conflicts: Korean War

Robert Carlton Horton (July 25, 1926 – March 15, 2014) was an American mining engineer. He served as the 17th director of the U.S. Bureau of Mines.

== Early life ==
Robert Carlton Horton was born on July 25, 1926, with his identical twin brother, Richard Wingfield Horton, to Eathal and Frank E. Horton in Tonopah, Nevada. Frank E. Horton owned the Weepah Mine in Esmeralda County, Nevada in the 1920s and 1930s, and had previously owned the Diamondfield Daisy Mine in Goldfield, Nevada. He attended primary schools in Reno, Nevada and Unionville, Nevada. He graduated from Humboldt County High School in 1944. Horton then moved back to Reno and attended the University of Nevada, Reno and graduated with a Bachelor of Science degree in mining engineering in 1949. He then earned a professional engineer distinction.

== Career ==
Horton enlisted in the U.S. Navy and served two years as a naval aviation cadet. He served during the Korean War as an Air Intelligence Officer on the USS Yorktown as a lieutenant. He continued serving in the U.S. Navy Reserve after leaving active service.

Horton served as a geological assistant with the U.S. Geological Survey between 1949 and 1950. In late 1950, Horton founded a consulting firm called United Engineers in Reno.

Horton and his twin brother, Richard, ran consecutive bids for the U.S. House of Representatives in 1956 and 1958, and were both defeated by the incumbent Walter S. Baring Jr.

Horton then worked at the Nevada Bureau of Mines at the University of Nevada from 1956 to 1966. He started as an assistant mining engineer, then became a mining engineer, and finally served as the administrative head and associate director of the bureau in 1965. At the University of Nevada, he also served as chairman of the University Council and starting in 1959, he served as secretary of the Nevada Oil and Gas Conservation Commission. He then worked as a vice president for three different corporations responsible for exploration, drilling and production of petroleum in eastern Nevada. He then worked for Meiser Enterprises as chief of construction. Horton next worked for Bendix Corporation as a geologist at its Bendix Field Engineering Corporation in Reno. He later moved to Grand Junction, Colorado headquarters to work as the geology director of the entire Bendix Corporation.

In 1981, Horton moved to Washington, D.C. after being nominated by President Ronald Reagan as the director of the U.S. Bureau of Mines. He served in the role from September 1981 to July 1987.

Horton returned to Reno to work as an associate dean for the Nevada Bureau of Mines. He was named director of the University of Nevada Reno Center for Strategic Materials Research and Policy Study. He worked as a consultant on the board of directors of FirstMiss Gold Inc. and Getchell Gold Corporation mines until his retirement.

== Personal life and death ==
In 1952, Horton married his high school sweetheart Beverly Burhans (d. 2008) of Winnemucca, Nevada. Together, they had three daughters: Debra, Robin and Cindy.

Horton died on March 15, 2014.

== Awards ==
Horton received an honorary Doctor of Science degree in 1985 from the University of Nevada, Reno.
