= John F. O'Leary =

American government official and business executive (1926–1987)

John O'Leary

Administrator of the Federal Energy Administration
- In office February 5, 1977 – September 30, 1977
- President: Jimmy Carter
- Preceded by: Frank Zarb
- Succeeded by: James R. Schlesinger (DOE)

Director of the U.S. Bureau of Mines
- In office October 23, 1968 – March 1, 1970
- Preceded by: Walter R. Hibbard Jr.
- Succeeded by: Elburt F. Osborn

Personal details
- Born: John Francis O'Leary; June 23, 1926 Reno, Nevada, U.S.
- Died: December 19, 1987 (aged 61) Philadelphia, Pennsylvania, U.S.
- Party: Democratic
- Spouse: Hazel Reid (m. 1980)
- Education: George Washington University (BA)

Military service
- Allegiance: United States
- Branch/service: United States Army
- Years of service: 1945–1946
- Rank: Corporal

John Francis O'Leary (June 23, 1926 – December 19, 1987) was an American government official and business executive. He held top positions in the Federal Energy Administration and the U.S. Department of Energy before moving to the private sector, where he rose to chairman and chief executive officer of General Public Utilities Corp.

== Early life ==
O'Leary was born on June 23, 1926, in Reno, Nevada. He was educated in public schools in Nevada and California. O'Leary graduated from Central High School in Washington, D.C. and entered the U.S. Army in 1945. He was discharged with the rank of corporal in 1946. He received a Bachelor of Arts in economics from the George Washington University in 1950 and did graduate work in economics there from 1950 to 1953.

== Career ==
O'Leary joined the staff of the U.S. Bureau of Mines in 1950. In 1952, he became a staff member of the Division of Minerals and Fuels. He then served as a specialist in minerals and fuels economics at the Office of the Assistant Secretary for Mineral Resources. In 1959, he was appointed Staff Assistant to the Assistant Secretary for Mineral Resources. In June 1962, he was appointed the Special Assistant to the Assistant Secretary and in March 1963, he was appointed as the Deputy Assistant Secretary. He left the Bureau of Mines and was appointed as the Chief of the Bureau of Natural Gas at the Federal Power Commission on March 20, 1967.

O'Leary was appointed as the 12th director of the U.S. Bureau of Mines in 1968 by President Lyndon B. Johnson. O'Leary faced conflict with regulators and members of the coal industry after supporting stronger coal mine federal safety regulations after the Farmington Mine disaster. He submitted a letter of resignation on January 21, 1969, but President Richard Nixon did not choose to accept the letter until March 1, 1970.

O'Leary served as the head of the Federal Energy Administration until 1977, when President Jimmy Carter appointed him as deputy secretary of the newly formed U.S. Department of Energy. O'Leary left the Department of Energy in 1979. He joined the board of General Public Utilities Corp. following the Three Mile Island nuclear accident.

He also worked for Mitre Corporation and served as the Secretary of Energy and Minerals for New Mexico.

== Personal life and death ==
O'Leary married government energy official Hazel Reid on April 24, 1980. O'Leary died in Philadelphia, Pennsylvania, of cancer at age 61.

Political offices
Preceded by Walter R. Hibbard Jr.	Director of the United States Bureau of Mines; 1968–1970	Succeeded by Elburt F. Osborn
Preceded by Frank Zarb	Administrator of the Federal Energy Administration; 1977	Succeeded by James R. Schlesinger as United States Secretary of Energy
