= John J. Forbes =

American mining engineer

9th Director of the U.S. Bureau of Mines
- In office November 15, 1951 – November 30, 1955
- Preceded by: James Boyd
- Succeeded by: Marling J. Ankeny

Personal details
- Born: November 21, 1885 Shamokin, Pennsylvania, U.S.
- Died: October 17, 1975 (aged 89) Harrisburg, Pennsylvania, U.S.
- Resting place: St. Edward's Cemetery; Shamokin, Pennsylvania, U.S.
- Spouse: Irene Mudd (m. 1917)
- Children: 2
- Education: Kutztown State Teachers' College; Pennsylvania State University (BS)
- Occupation: mining engineer

John J. Forbes (November 21, 1885 – October 17, 1975) was an American mining engineer. He served as the 9th director of the U.S. Bureau of Mines.

== Early life and education ==
Forbes was born on November 21, 1885, in Shamokin, Pennsylvania, to Bridget (née Buggy) and John T. Forbes.

His first job was as a breaker boy at a local colliery at the age of ten. He graduated from Coal Township High School in Coal Township. By 1905, Forbes received a teaching degree from Kutztown State Teachers' College. He later attended Pennsylvania State University and graduated with a Bachelor of Science in mining engineering in 1911.

== Career ==
Forbes taught in Coal Township for two years after graduating from Kutztown in 1905. He then worked in a number of coal mines in Pennsylvania and Ohio.

=== U.S. Bureau of Mines ===
Forbes joined the U.S. Bureau of Mines in February 1915 as a first aid miner. He then worked as a foreman miner, junior mining engineer, mining engineer, senior mining engineer and principal mining engineer. In July 1927, Forbes was appointed supervising engineer and was assigned to the safety division in Pittsburgh. He continued working in the safety division until September 1941 when he was appointed chief mine inspector of the bureau. This role was to supervise activities under the Federal Coal Mine Inspection and Investigations Act, authorized on May 7, 1941, and required a transfer to the new Mineral Production Security Division in Washington, D.C. During two work stoppages in 1943 and 1945, Forbes was appointed Anthracite Regional Manager in the Coal Region of Northeastern Pennsylvania for the Solid Fuels Administration.

The Mineral Production Security Division dissolved in 1945 and Forbes was promoted to assistant chief of the Health and Safety Branch. and resumed his previous role as supervisor of the Coal Mine Inspection Division. Forbes was appointed as director of the U.S. Bureau of Mines by President Harry S. Truman, succeeding James Boyd on November 15, 1951, during a congressional recess.

He was not confirmed by the U.S. Senate until February 20, 1952. Tom Lyon was nominated by President Dwight D. Eisenhower to replace Forbes, but withdrew his nomination following a 1953 Senate confirmation. In 1954, Forbes decreased the number of regional directorates to five in the bureau.

Forbes retired on November 30, 1955, after reaching the mandatory retirement age of 70.

=== Other endeavors ===
Forbes served as director of the National First Aid and Mine Rescue Contest in Columbus, Ohio, in October 1951. He also served as president of the Washington chapter of the American Society of Safety Engineers in 1950.

== Personal life ==
Forbes married Irene Mudd on March 26, 1917, in Pittsburgh, Kansas. Together, they had two children, John and Marisse.

Forbes was known by his contemporaries as "Jack".

== Death ==
Forbes died on October 17, 1975, at Polyclinic Hospital in Harrisburg, Pennsylvania. He was buried at St. Edward's Cemetery in Shamokin, Pennsylvania.
