= Scott Turner (engineer) =

American mining engineer (1880–1972)

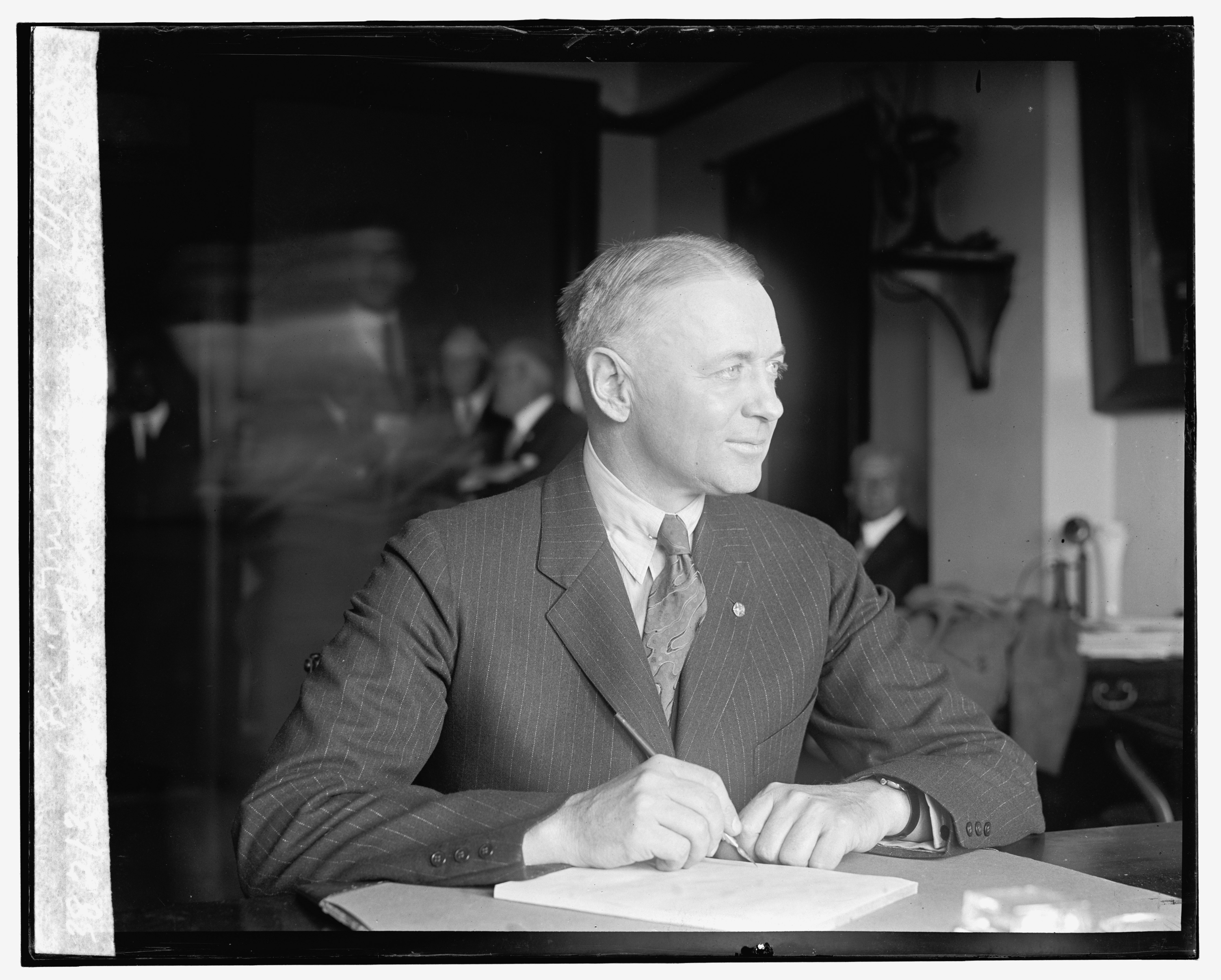
- Photograph of Turner in 1925

5th Director of the U.S. Bureau of Mines
- In office 1925 – August 16, 1934
- Preceded by: H. Foster Bain
- Succeeded by: John W. Finch

Personal details
- Born: July 31, 1880 Lansing, Michigan, U.S.
- Died: July 30, 1972 (aged 91) Greenwich, Connecticut, U.S.
- Resting place: Mount Hope Cemetery; Lansing, Michigan, U.S.
- Spouse: Amy Prudden Jenison (m. 1919; died 1972)
- Parent: James Munroe Turner (father)
- Education: University of Michigan (AB); Michigan College of Mines (EM)
- Occupation: mining engineer
- Awards: Hoover Medal
- Military career
- Allegiance: United States
- Branch: U.S. Navy
- Conflicts: World War I; Sinking of the RMS Lusitania

Scott Turner (July 31, 1880 – July 30, 1972) was an American mining engineer. He served as the 5th Director of the United States Bureau of Mines from 1926 to 1934 and was the 18th recipient of the Hoover Medal.

== Early life ==
Turner was born in 1880 in Lansing, Michigan, son of James Munroe Turner and Sophie (Scott) Turner. His father owned a 1,200 acre Springdale Farm in Lansing, a property known for its prize beef at the time. His grandfather James Madison Turner built the Turner-Dodge House in Lansing. He obtained his Bachelor of Arts in geology from the University of Michigan in 1902, and his EM from the Michigan College of Mines, now Michigan Technological University, in 1904.

== Career ==
Turner started his career as mining engineer, developing mineral deposits in Alaska, Panama, Canada and 14 other countries. For a time he managed the Arctic Coal Company in Spitsbergen (now Svalbard).

In World War I he served in the U.S. Navy, and in 1915 he survived the sinking of the RMS Lusitania. He was on the Lusitania to assess a coal discovery in Spitsbergen, Norway.

From 1926 to 1934 he was director of the United States Bureau of Mines. He resigned in July 1934, but did not leave office until August 16, 1934.

In 1932, he served as president of the American Institute of Mining, Metallurgical, and Petroleum Engineers (AIME).

== Personal ==
Turner married Amy Prudden Jenison in 1919. She died on February 6, 1972.

Turner sold Springdale Farm to the city of Lansing after World War II. From a portion of the property, the city built Arboretum Park in its place in the 1950s.

== Death ==
Turner died on July 30, 1972, in Greenwich, Connecticut. He was buried in Mount Hope Cemetery in Lansing.
