= T. S. Ary =

American politician

18th Director of U.S. Bureau of Mines
- In office March 31, 1988 – January 1993
- Preceded by: Robert C. Horton
- Succeeded by: Herman Enzer (acting)

Personal details
- Born: March 30, 1925 Eldorado, Illinois, U.S.
- Died: April 26, 2009 (aged 84) Arlington, Virginia, U.S.
- Resting place: Mount Olivet United Methodist Church Cemetery; Arlington, Virginia, U.S.
- Spouse(s): Martha; Temple
- Children: 1
- Education: Stanford University (BS)
- Occupation: mining engineer; politician
- Military career
- Allegiance: United States
- Branch: United States Navy; United States Navy Reserve
- Service years: 1943–1959
- Conflicts: World War II

T. S. Ary (March 30, 1925 – April 26, 2009) was the 18th Director of the U.S. Bureau of Mines.

== Early life ==
T. S. Ary was born on March 30, 1925, to McKinley and Emma Ary in Eldorado, Illinois, and grew up in Evansville. He attended local schools in Evansville.

Ary graduated from Stanford University in 1951 with a Bachelor of Science in mining geology. At Stanford, he was an avid athlete, participating in football, basketball, swimming and rugby. He also completed graduate work in mineral law, land management, international studies and business.

== Career ==
=== Military career ===
In 1943, Ary joined the U. S. Navy's V-5 Program and was commissioned as a pilot during World War II. He was honorably discharged from active duty in 1947, and served in the U.S. Navy Reserve until 1959.

=== Mining career ===
In 1951, Ary joined Anaconda Copper in Butte, Montana. He served as a shift boss and assistant supervisor for several mines on Butte Hill. He then served in Anaconda's geology department. Ary joined Union Carbide in 1953 as a mining engineer and superintendent of a vanadium mine in Rifle, Colorado. In 1967, Ary was named vice president of Union Carbide Exploration Corporation in New York City. He stayed in that role until 1975. Ary worked as vice president of exploration and director of development for Utah International, Inc. in San Francisco, California, from 1975 to 1980.

In 1980, Ary became president of Kerr-McGee Corporation's Minerals Exploration Division in Oklahoma City, Oklahoma. He was responsible for worldwide hard mineral and coal exploration. He served in that role until 1988.

Ary also served for four years on the National Strategic Materials and Minerals Program Advisory Committee for the U.S. Secretary of the Interior. Ary was on the U.S. Department Task Force to the United National Law of the Sea Convention. He also served on the Mineral Advisory Committee to the U.S. Department of Commerce. He was chairman of the Minerals Advisory Committee of the American Mining Congress, chairman of the Natural Resources Committee of the National Association of Manufacturers, director of the American Engineering Society, chairman of the Colorado Plateau Section of the American Institute of Mining and Metallurgical Engineers (AIME) and director of the Colorado Public Expenditures Council.

=== U.S. Bureau of Mines ===
Ary was nominated by President Ronald Reagan as Director of the U.S. Bureau of Mines. He was appointed the 18th Director on March 31, 1988, succeeding Robert C. Horton, and serving under Presidents Reagan and George H. W. Bush. Under his leadership, the Bureau of Mines advanced a number of technologies, including self-rescue breathing equipment, production processes for specialty metals, construction of man made wetlands, and the use of bacteria to remove arsenic and cyanide from waste waters. He left the Bureau at the start of Clinton's administration in January 1993, and Herman Enzer became the acting director.

== Personal life ==
Ary was married to Martha for 64 years. Together, they had one son, David. He also married Temple.

== Death ==
Ary died on April 26, 2009, at his home in Arlington, Virginia. He was buried at Mount Olivet United Methodist Church Cemetery.

== Awards ==
Ary received the Society for Mining, Metallurgy & Exploration President's Citation in 1991. He was awarded the AIME Robert Earl McConnell Award in 1993. Ary was posthumously inducted into the National Mining Hall of Fame in 2015.
