= Sue Landon Vaughan =

American artist and writer (1835–1911)

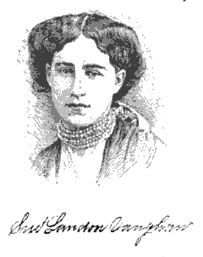
- From The National Cyclopedia of American Biography, Vol. XIV, 1910
- Born: October 12, 1835; Meadowdale, Missouri, U.S.
- Died: July 22, 1911 (aged 75); Arlington, Virginia, U.S.
- Resting place: Mount Olivet United Methodist Church, Arlington, Virginia, U.S.
- Occupations: artist; writer
- Spouse: Cornelius Lewis Neville Vaughan (m. 1876; died 1893)
- Relatives: Robert H. Adams (uncle)

Sue Landon Vaughan (October 12, 1835 – July 22, 1911) was an American artist and writer best known for falsely claiming to have originated the Memorial Day holiday.

== Early life ==
Sue Landon Adams was born on October 12, 1835, in Meadowdale, Missouri, to Margaret A. (née Gill) and John Adams. Her father was a judge. Her uncle was Mississippi politician Robert H. Adams. She was educated at Fielding Institute, Lindonwood College and Fulton Female College in Missouri and taught school in Jackson, Mississippi, in 1865.

== Personal life ==
She married Cornelius Lewis Neville Vaughan in San Francisco, California in 1876. Her husband died in 1893 and she moved to Arlington, Virginia, to live with her sister Sallie Adams.

== Claim to fame ==
Vaughan claimed to have started the Memorial Day holiday on April 26, 1865. This date and her name appear on the southeast portion of the Confederate Monument in Jackson, Mississippi.

Briefly, the story goes that Vaughan (Adams, at the time) was at a friend’s home north of Jackson, Mississippi on the night of April 25, 1865. Around midnight, two couriers arrive to tell them that their army is on the verge of surrender. Vaughan grabs a pencil and scrap of paper to write a plea to the "daughters of the Southland" to garland the graves of the dead soldiers the next day. The note is pinned to the jacket of one of the couriers who rushes to the newspaper office to have it printed in the next day’s paper. The following morning everyone meets at the cemeteries and the graves are heaped with flowers, starting the Memorial Day holiday.

She apparently wrote several similar versions of the story. The Mississippi Archives preserves a letter Vaughan wrote in 1897 describing the circumstances surrounding her inauguration of the holiday. Many of the details differ from another version of the story published in the Confederate Veteran magazine in 1898.

In their book, The Genesis of the Memorial Day Holiday in America, Bellware and Gardiner take issue with Vaughan’s claim. There is no contemporaneous evidence of her actions, despite claiming that she wrote her appeal in the Mississippian newspaper and no record of any witnesses to corroborate her story. In addition, the details she describes do not match the historical record of the surrender of General Taylor to General Canby at the War’s end. Her story is similar to the verifiable account of Mary Ann Williams. Williams wrote a letter to the press in March 1866 that was reprinted throughout the South. She proposed an annual decoration custom starting on April 26, 1866, the anniversary of Johnston's surrender to Sherman. Vaughan's claim was determined to be just one of the many hoaxes that arose to explain the origin of the holiday.

Vaughan attempted to capitalize on her claim by copyrighting a couple of drawings she made in 1908 and selling them as postcards.

== Death ==
Aged and destitute, Vaughan applied to the Masonic and Eastern Star home for the District of Columbia and was admitted in 1909. She died there in 1911. She is buried at Mount Olivet United Methodist Church in Arlington.
