= Carleton, Nebraska =

Village in Thayer County, Nebraska, United States

- Village
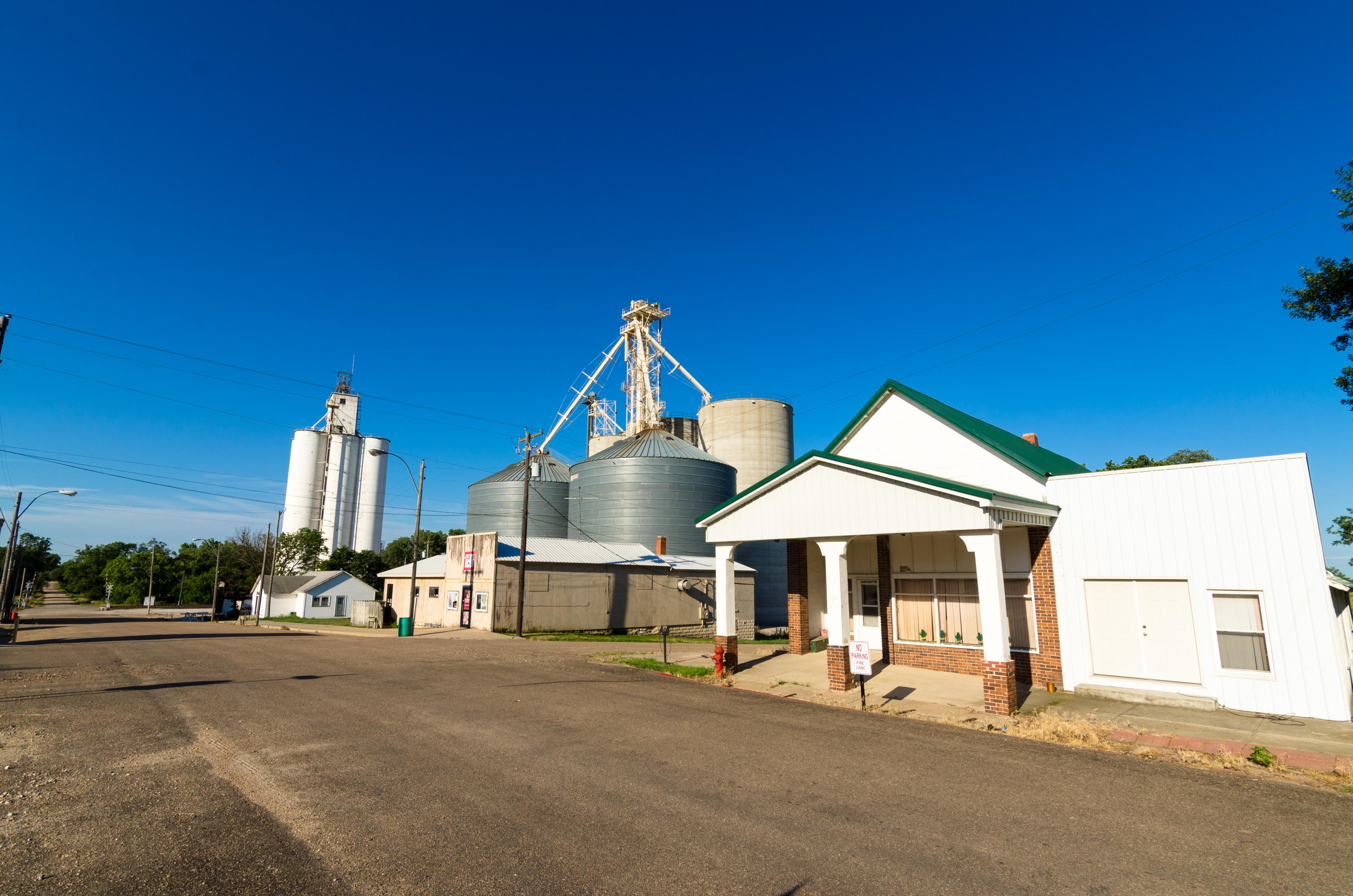
- Downtown Carleton in July 2017

- Location of Carleton, Nebraska
- Coordinates: 40°18′12″N 97°41′01″W
- Country: United States
- State: Nebraska
- County: Thayer

Area
  - Total: 0.79 sq mi (2.05 km^{2})
  - Land: 0.79 sq mi (2.05 km^{2})
  - Water: 0 sq mi (0.00 km^{2})
- Elevation: 1,562 ft (476 m)

Population (2020)
  - Total: 94
  - Estimate (2021): 91
  - Density: 120/sq mi (46/km^{2})
- Time zone: UTC-6 (Central (CST))
  - Summer (DST): UTC-5 (CDT)
- ZIP code: 68326
- Area code: 402
- FIPS code: 31-07975
- GNIS feature ID: 2397555

Carleton is a village in Thayer County, Nebraska, United States. The population was 94 at the 2020 census.

== History ==
Carleton was established in 1872 when the railroad was extended to that point. It was named for Carleton B. Emory, the son of an early settler.

== Geography ==
According to the United States Census Bureau, the village has a total area of 0.91 square miles (2.36 km^{2}), all land.

== Demographics ==
Historical population
Census	Pop.	Note	%±
1880	274		—
1890	458		67.2%
1900	309		−32.5%
1910	393		27.2%
1920	350		−10.9%
1930	363		3.7%
1940	350		−3.6%
1950	291		−16.9%
1960	207		−28.9%
1970	163		−21.3%
1980	160		−1.8%
1990	144		−10.0%
2000	136		−5.6%
2010	91		−33.1%
2020	92		1.1%
2021 (est.)	91	▼	−1.1%
U.S. Decennial Census

=== 2010 census ===
As of the census of 2010, there were 91 people, 40 households, and 27 families residing in the village. The population density was 100.0 inhabitants per square mile (38.6/km^{2}). There were 49 housing units at an average density of 53.8 per square mile (20.8/km^{2}). The racial makeup of the village was 96.7% White, 1.1% African American, and 2.2% from two or more races.

There were 40 households, of which 25.0% had children under the age of 18 living with them, 55.0% were married couples living together, 10.0% had a female householder with no husband present, 2.5% had a male householder with no wife present, and 32.5% were non-families. 30.0% of all households were made up of individuals, and 20% had someone living alone who was 65 years of age or older. The average household size was 2.28 and the average family size was 2.52.

The median age in the village was 49.5 years. 22% of residents were under the age of 18; 1.1% were between the ages of 18 and 24; 19.8% were from 25 to 44; 33% were from 45 to 64; and 24.2% were 65 years of age or older. The gender makeup of the village was 48.4% male and 51.6% female.

=== 2000 census ===
As of the census of 2000, there were 136 people, 54 households, and 38 families residing in the village. The population density was 278.9 inhabitants per square mile (107.7/km^{2}). There were 57 housing units at an average density of 116.9 per square mile (45.1/km^{2}). The racial makeup of the village was 100.00% White.

There were 54 households, out of which 29.6% had children under the age of 18 living with them, 64.8% were married couples living together, 1.9% had a female householder with no husband present, and 29.6% were non-families. 25.9% of all households were made up of individuals, and 11.1% had someone living alone who was 65 years of age or older. The average household size was 2.52 and the average family size was 3.08.

In the village, the population was spread out, with 27.9% under the age of 18, 2.2% from 18 to 24, 24.3% from 25 to 44, 28.7% from 45 to 64, and 16.9% who were 65 years of age or older. The median age was 40 years. For every 100 females, there were 106.1 males. For every 100 females age 18 and over, there were 104.2 males.

As of 2000 the median income for a household in the village was $38,125, and the median income for a family was $39,375. Males had a median income of $30,833 versus $16,875 for females. The per capita income for the village was $15,897. There were no families and 1.5% of the population living below the poverty line, including no under eighteens and none of those over 64.

== Notable people ==
- Roy Hitt, baseball player
- Marling J. Ankeny, 10th director of the U.S. Bureau of Mines

== See also ==
- List of municipalities in Nebraska
