= John W. Finch =

American mining engineer (1873–1951)

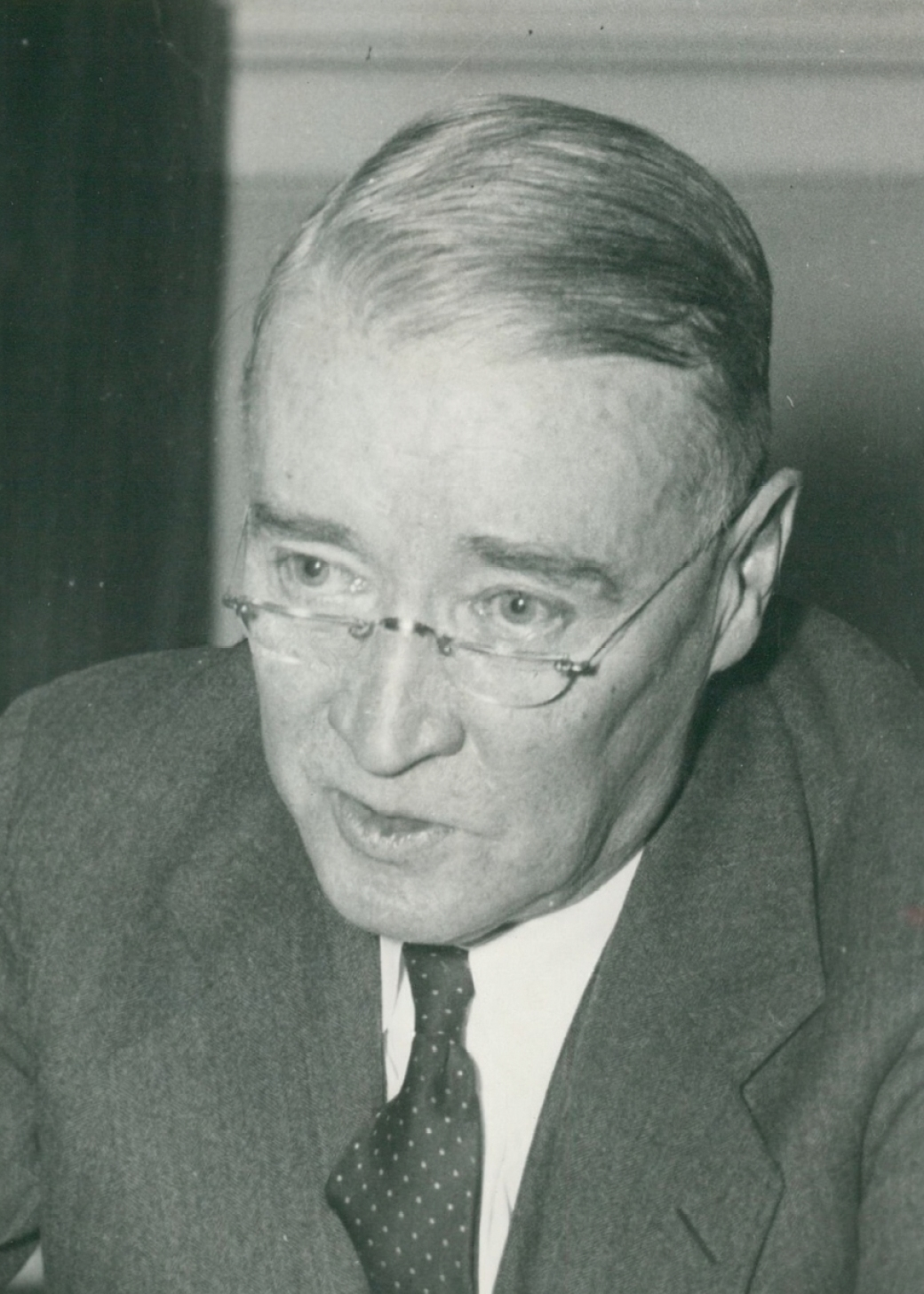
- Finch c. 1930s

6th Director of the U.S. Bureau of Mines
- In office August 17, 1934 – 1940
- Preceded by: Scott Turner
- Succeeded by: Royd R. Sayers

Personal details
- Born: John Wellington Finch; November 3, 1873 Lebanon, New York, U.S.
- Died: February 19, 1951 (aged 77) Denver, Colorado, U.S.
- Spouse: Ethel Ione Woods (m. 1901)
- Children: 2
- Education: Colgate University (BA, MA)

John Wellington Finch (November 3, 1873 – February 19, 1951) was an American mining engineer and the 6th director of the U.S. Bureau of Mines.

== Early life ==
John Wellington Finch was born on November 3, 1873, in Lebanon, New York, to Mary Ellen (née Lillibridge) and Deloss L. Finch. He graduated from Colgate University in 1897 with a Bachelor of Arts and a Master of Arts degree in 1898. He then went to the University of Chicago for graduate studies.

== Career ==
While working on his graduate studies, Finch taught at the University of Chicago. Finch was appointed as state geologist of Colorado by Governor James Bradley Orman in 1901. He worked as a consulting geologist and engineer for a variety of companies, including the Amalgamated Copper Company, the Anaconda Copper Company, Hayden, Stone & Co., J.P. Morgan & Co., and William Boyce Thompson. He was also used as an expert witness in mining cases, including a 1914 dispute between the Jim Butler Tonopah Mining Company and the West End Consolidated Mining Company in Nevada.

Finch traveled and conducted mining surveys in China, Siam, India, Asia Minor, and Africa between 1916 and 1922. In 1922, Finch was one of ten men to enter the Tomb of Tutankhamun in Egypt.

From 1925 to 1929, Finch was a professor of mining geology at the Colorado School of Mines. In 1930, he was appointed the dean of the mining school at the University of Idaho until 1934. He resigned from his post in July 1934 to serve as director of the U.S. Bureau of Mines. However, the appointment was postponed due to an investigation into his political affiliations with former U.S. President Herbert Hoover being conducted by Postmaster General James Farley. Finch returned back to his post at the University of Idaho.

Finch replaced Scott Turner as the director of the U.S. Bureau of Mines on August 17, 1934. Turner led the Bureau as it added conserving natural resources and protecting workers and communities to its mission. In 1936, a Coal Division was created within the Technologic Branch to focus on coal research within the Bureau. He led the Bureau until 1940.

== Personal life ==
Finch married Ethel Ione Woods, the daughter of Dr. Byron A. Woods, a pastor in Philadelphia, on April 10, 1901. Together, they had two daughters: Ione and Nancy.

The John Wellington Finch–Arthur Bosworth House is part of the Country Club Historic District in Denver, Colorado.

== Death ==
Finch died on February 19, 1951, in Denver.

== Awards ==
Finch received a Doctor of Science honorary degree in 1913.
