= United States Bureau of Mines =

Government agency for mineral resources

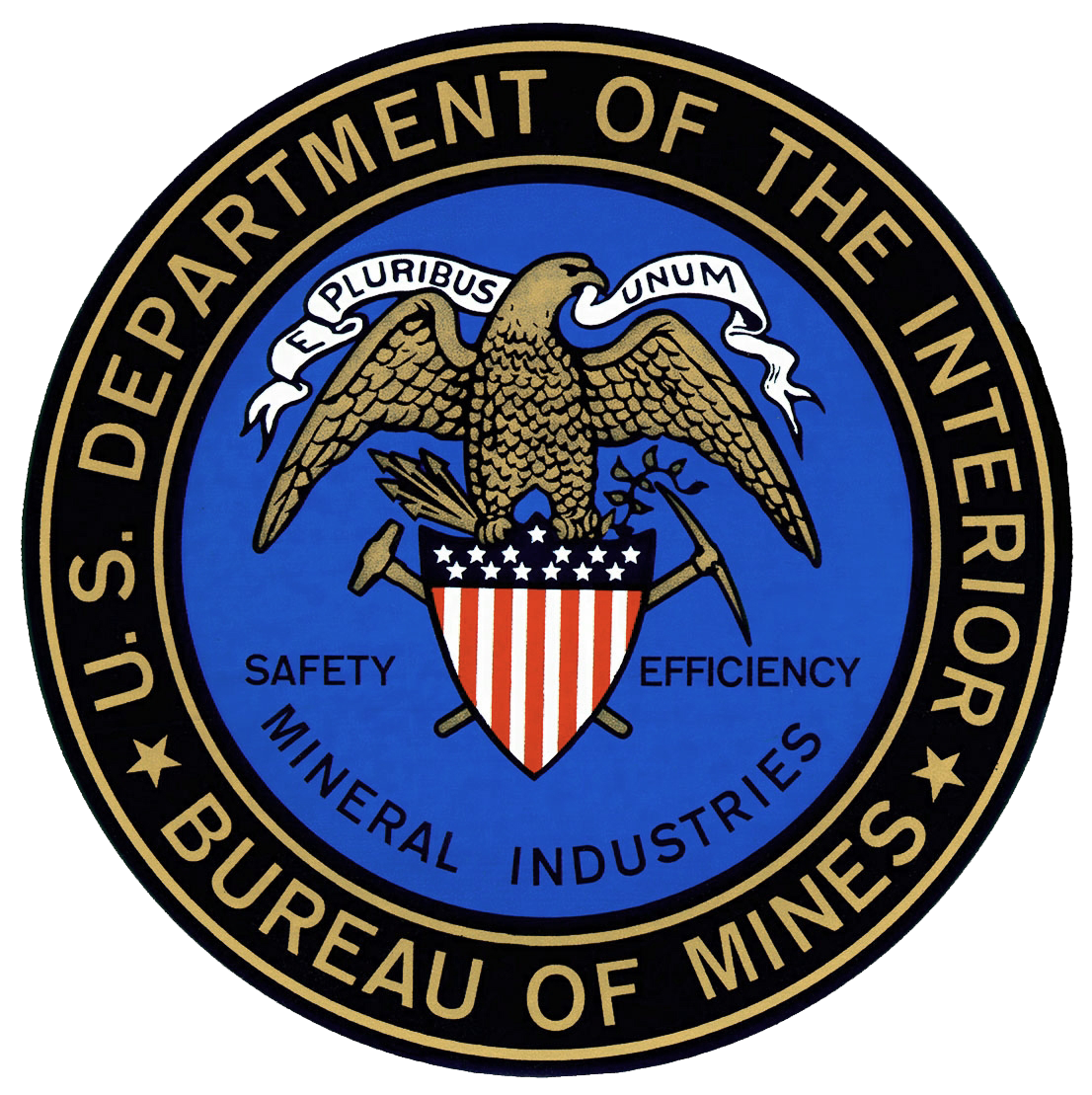

Agency overview
- Formed: May 16, 1910
- Dissolved: March 30, 1996
- Superseding agency: Department of Energy U.S. Geological Survey Bureau of Land Management Office of Mine Safety and Health Research National Mine Map Repository
- Jurisdiction: Federal Government of the United States
- Headquarters: Washington, D.C., U.S. (former)
- Motto: Safety and Efficiency
- Parent department: Department of the Interior

The United States Bureau of Mines (USBM) was the primary United States government agency in the 20th century that conducted scientific research and disseminated information on the extraction, processing, use, and conservation of mineral resources. The Bureau was abolished in 1996.

== History ==
The U.S. Bureau of Mines was established in the U.S. States Department of the Interior on May 16, 1910, pursuant to the Organic Act (Public Law 179), to deal with a wave of catastrophic mine disasters. The Bureau's mission was gradually expanded to include:

- The conduct of research to enhance the safety, health, and environmental impact of mining and processing of minerals and materials.
- The collection, analysis, and dissemination of information about mining and processing of more than 100 mineral commodities across the Nation and in more than 185 countries around the world.
- Analysis of the impact of proposed mineral-related laws and regulations upon the national interest.
- Production, conservation, sale, and distribution of helium for essential government activities.
- Respirator guidelines, and after the Hawks Nest Tunnel disaster, respirator regulation and approval.

The first director of the USBM was Joseph Austin Holmes, a pioneer in occupational safety and health. He served from 1910 until his death in 1915.

From its creation, the USBM was viewed, both nationally and internationally, as the focal point for new and emerging science and technology in the minerals field. Since entering competition in 1978, the Bureau of Mines won 35 R&D 100 Awards, given annually by R&D Magazine for the 100 most important research innovations of the year. This achievement is especially impressive considering the small size of the Bureau's research budget, compared to those of competing organizations, such as E.I. du Pont de Nemours and Company, Westinghouse Electric Corporation, General Electric Company, Hitachi, the Department of Energy, and NASA.

== Evolution of USBM ==
USBM originally provided safety and health inspection for mines on a nationwide basis, replacing some, but not all state inspection operations. This division comprised the majority of personnel in USBM. In 1973 the Secretary of the Interior created a separate agency within the department, the Mining Enforcement and Safety Administration (MESA), and the safety and health enforcement responsibilities were transferred to the new agency. In 1977 Congress passed the Federal Mine Safety and Health Act, which expanded the federal authority for health and safety regulation, and created a new agency, the Mine Safety and Health Administration (MSHA). MSHA is located in the Department of Labor, and replaced MESA.

Congress created the Office of Surface Mining with the passage of the Surface Mining Control and Reclamation Act of 1977, and this agency inherited USBM's surface mining activities. The Department of Energy (DOE), also established in 1977, took over the USBM Coal Productivity Research division. However, the work was left unfunded by the newly created DOE as other priorities took the budget. These reorganizations led to a reduction in USBM staff, from approximately 6,000 in 1968 to 2,600 in the late 1970s. At its peak, USBM had 14 centers throughout the nation, but that was eventually reduced to four "mining research centers" in Denver, Pittsburgh, Minneapolis, and Spokane.

== Closure of USBM ==
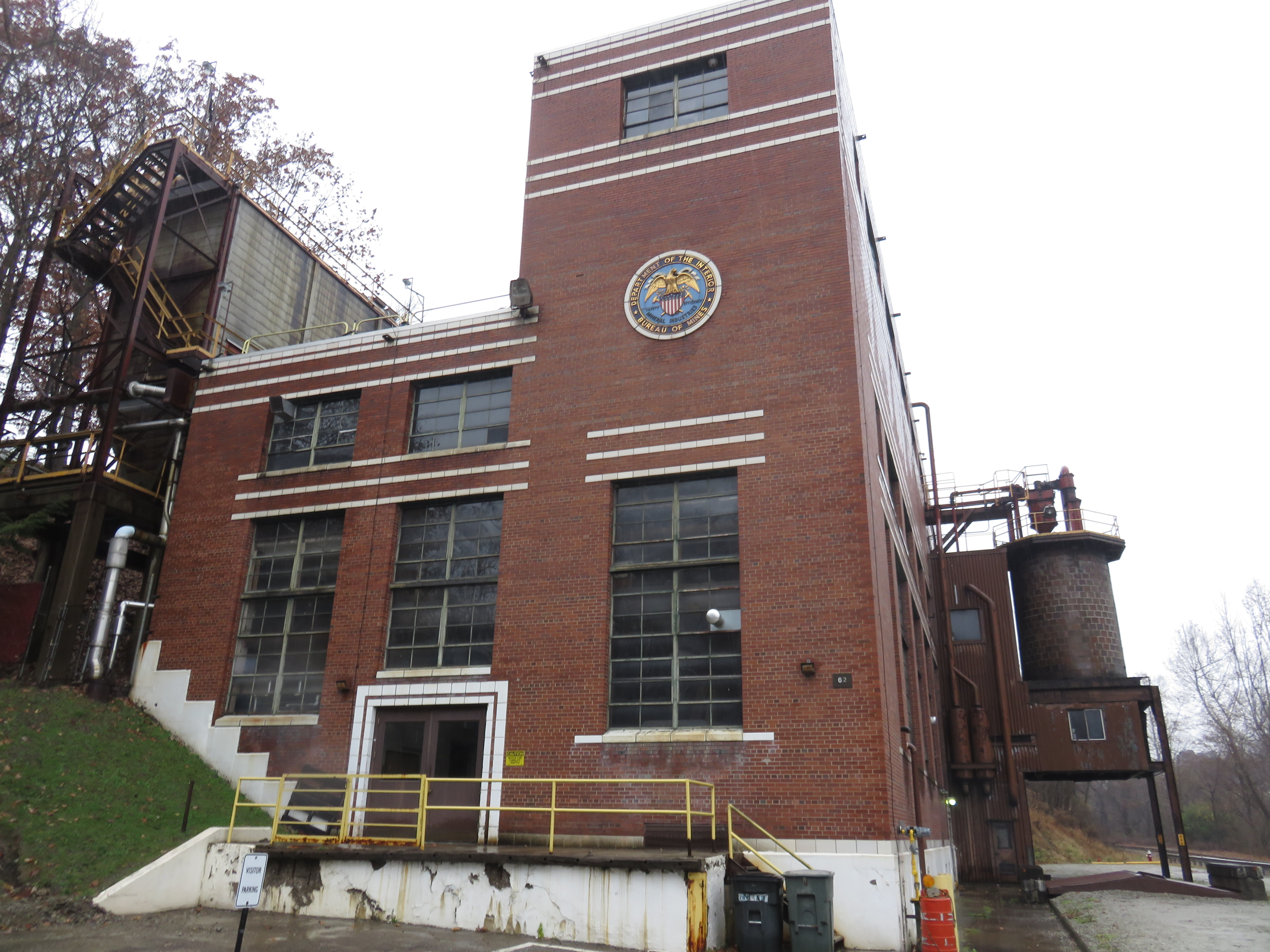
Building at the Bruceton Research Center near Pittsburgh in 2018, displaying a Bureau of Mines seal long after its closure

"We leave knowing that the proud accomplishments of this agency did make a difference in the quality of life we now enjoy, and they will continue to do so well into the 21st century." — USBM Director Rhea Graham

In September 1995, Congress voted to close the Bureau of Mines and to transfer certain functions to other federal agencies. With USBM's closure, almost $100 million, or 66%, of its 1995 programs ceased, and approximately 1,000 of its employees were dismissed. Certain specific health, safety, and materials programs were transferred to the Department of Energy, and certain minerals information activities moved to the U.S. Geological Survey and the Bureau of Land Management. The Bureau's archive of mining maps was transferred to the National Mine Map Repository (NMMR), a part of the Office of Surface Mining (OSM). Closure of the Bureau of Mines, and the accompanying transfers of functions and employee layoffs were essentially complete in March 1996.

The Bureau's Minerals Information functions were transferred to the U.S. Geological Survey (USGS) in early 1996. The "Mineral Industry Surveys", "Mineral Commodity Summaries", and the "Minerals Yearbook" continued to be published. The Bureau's technical reports are archived by the Technical Report Archive & Image Library.

The Health and Safety Research Program at the Pittsburgh and Spokane Research Centers was assigned on an interim basis to DOE (Public Law 104-99). In fiscal year 1997, it was permanently transferred to the National Institute for Occupational Safety and Health (NIOSH) (Public Law 104-134). NIOSH is part of the Centers for Disease Control and Prevention within the Department of Health and Human Services. A total of 413 full-time equivalent employees were transferred to NIOSH on October 11, 1996: 336 in Pittsburgh and 77 in Spokane. A position of Associate Director for Mining in the NIOSH headquarters office was created. Under NIOSH, the Pittsburgh and Spokane Research "Centers" were renamed the Pittsburgh Research Laboratory and Spokane Research Laboratory. Both labs currently reside under NIOSH's Office of Mine Safety and Health Research.

== Proposed re-establishment ==
On May 28, 2010, Senator Jay Rockefeller (D-WV) released a list of proposed changes to mine safety laws including re-establishing the Bureau of Mines.

In July 2024, mining companies started a lobbying campaign to revive the Bureau of Mines in an effort to streamline how the federal government regulates and supports critical minerals production.

== Directors ==
The Bureau had 19 permanent directors from its inception in 1910 to its abolition in 1996.

No.	Image	Name	Took office	Left office	Notes
1		Joseph Austin Holmes	1910	1915	
2		Van H. Manning	1915	1920	
3		Frederick Gardner Cottrell	1920	1920	
4		H. Foster Bain	1921	1925	
5		Scott Turner	1925	1934	
6		John W. Finch	1934	1940	
7		Royd R. Sayers	1940	1947	
8		James Boyd	1947	1951	
9		John J. Forbes	1951	1955	
10		Marling J. Ankeny	1956	1964	
11		Walter R. Hibbard Jr.	1964	1968	
12		John F. O'Leary	1968	1970	
13		Elburt F. Osborn	1970	1973	
14		Thomas V. Falkie	1974	1977	
15		Roger A. Markle	1978	1979	
16		Lindsay D. Norman	1980	1981	
17		Robert C. Horton	1981	1987	
18		T. S. Ary	1988	1993	
—		Herman Enzer; Acting	1993	1994	
19		Rhea L. Graham	1994	1996	

== List of accomplishments ==
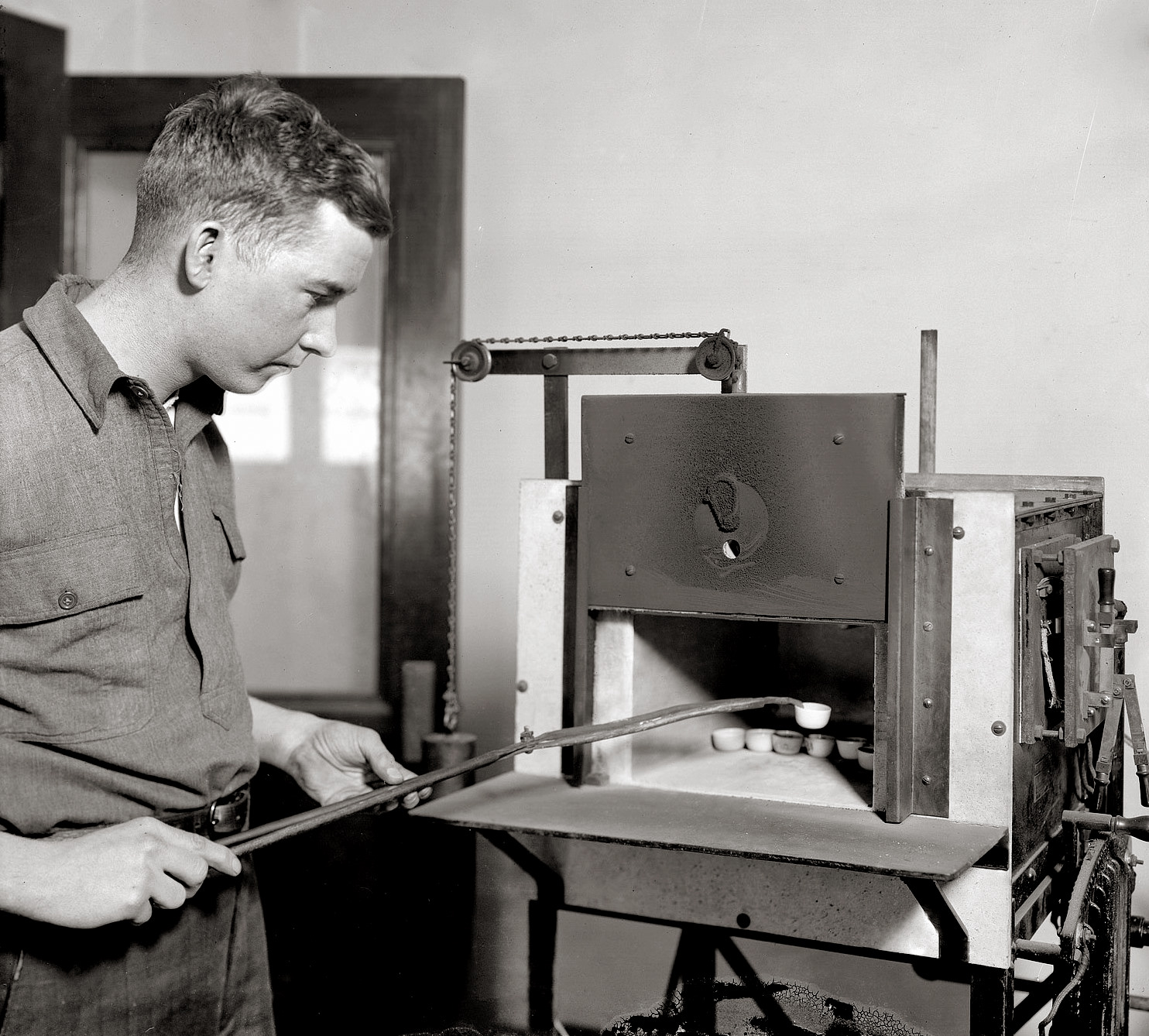
United States Bureau of Mines employee conducting a test, c. 1920

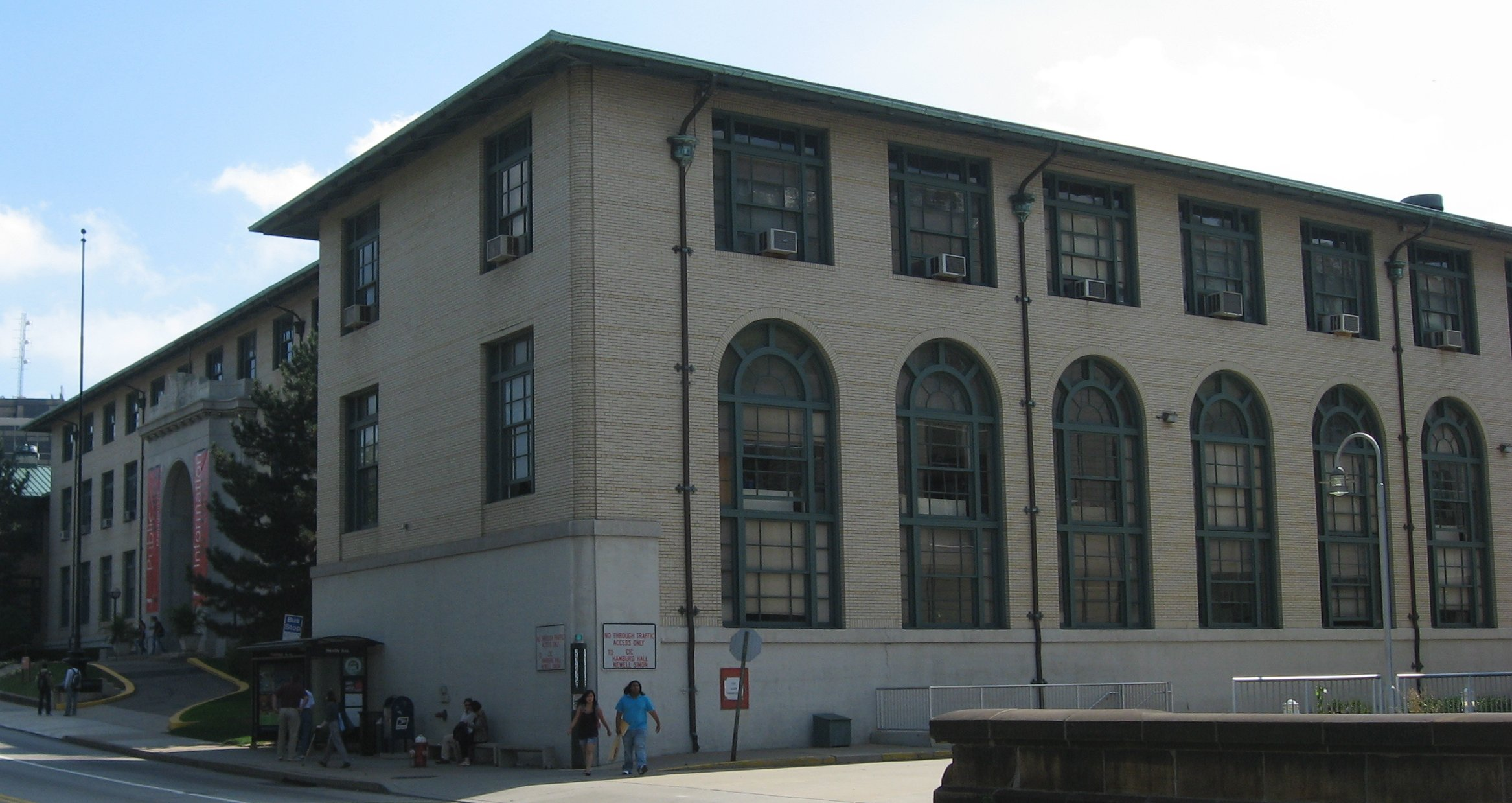
Former U.S. Bureau of Mines Building in Pittsburgh.

Since its founding, the numerous accomplishments of the Bureau of Mines have included the identification and development of many new processes, including:

- Technologies that contributed to reduction of fatalities in mine disasters by 97 percent, from 3,000 in 1907 to 98 in 1993.
- Self-rescue equipment to allow miners to continue to breathe when caught in underground disasters.
- Low-cost methods to extract radium for cancer treatment.
- Production processes for titanium, which is critical for aerospace and automobile manufacturing, and zirconium, which is essential to nuclear naval vessels.
- Techniques to recover strategic and critical minerals, such as cobalt and chromium, to reduce U.S. vulnerability to import blockages in international crises, especially during the Cold War.
- Construction of manmade wetlands to limit pollution of waterways by acid mine drainage from nearby mining and mineral-processing operations.
- Methods to minimize damage from subsidence, the sinking of the surface of the earth above underground mines.
- Improved recycling of metals, plastic and paper from municipal wastes, including a technology, now used around the world, to recycle municipal solid waste.
- Non-intrusive ways to recover minerals without disturbing the surface of the land.
- Use of bacteria to remove arsenic and cyanide from waste waters on public and private lands.
- Uncovering the world's largest deposits of lead and zinc at Alaska's Red Dog Creek, leading to hundreds of millions of dollars in capital investments for mine development.
- Karrick process (See Synthetic Liquid Fuels Program)

== See also ==
- MSHA
- Critical mineral raw materials
- Mining in the United States
