= Kishwaukee, Illinois =

- Unincorporated community
- Location within Illinois Location within the United States
- Coordinates: 42°09′54″N 89°09′00″W
- Country: United States
- State: Illinois
- County: Winnebago
- Elevation: 738 ft (225 m)
- Time zone: UTC-6 (Central (CST))
  - Summer (DST): UTC-5 (CDT)
- Area codes: 815 & 779
- GNIS feature ID: 422882

Kishwaukee is an unincorporated community in Winnebago County, in the U.S. state of Illinois.

== History ==
A post office called Kishwaukee was established in 1838, and remained in operation until it was discontinued in 1905. Kishwaukee is derived from a Native American language meaning "sycamore tree."
