= Montana Technological University =

Public university in Butte, Montana, US

Coordinates: 46°00′44″N 112°33′28″W

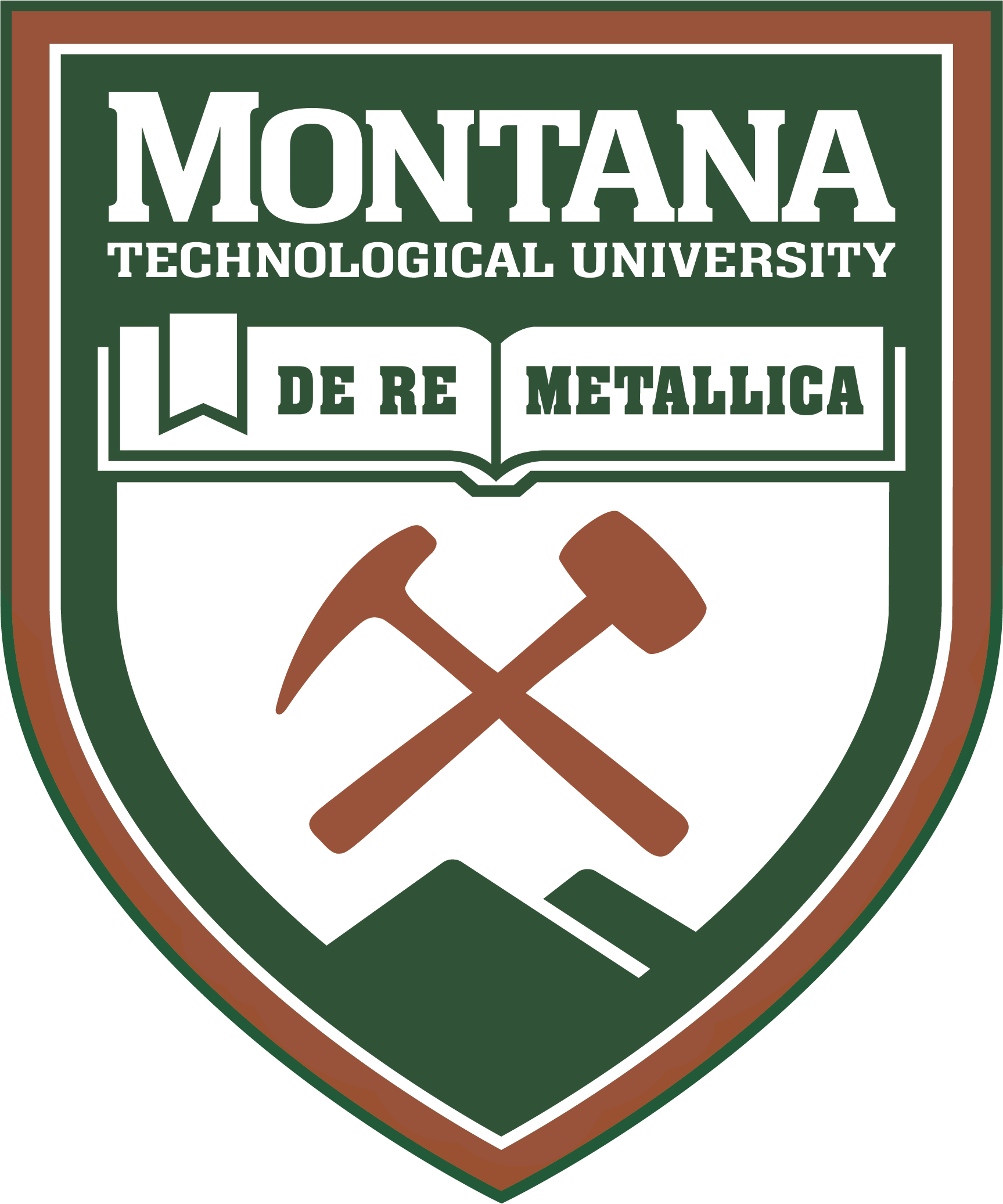
- Former names: Montana School of Mines (1900–1965); Montana College of Mineral Science and Technology (1965–1994); Montana Tech of the University of Montana (1994–2018)
- Motto: De re metallica (Latin)
- Motto in English: Of the metals (Note: De Re Metallica ("On the Nature of Metals") was a book by 16th-century metallurgist Georg Agricola (Georg Bauer).)
- Type: Public university
- Established: 1900; 126 years ago
- Parent institution: Montana University System
- Academic affiliations: Space-grant
- Endowment: $101.6 million (2025)
- Chancellor: Johnny MacLean
- Students: 2,516 (Fall 2025)
- Undergraduates: 2,310 (Fall 2025)
- Postgraduates: 206 (Fall 2025)
- Location: Butte, Montana, U.S.
- Campus: 137 acres (55 ha)
- Colors: Green & Copper
- Nickname: Orediggers
- Sporting affiliations: NAIA – Frontier
- Mascot: Charlie Oredigger
- Website: mtech.edu
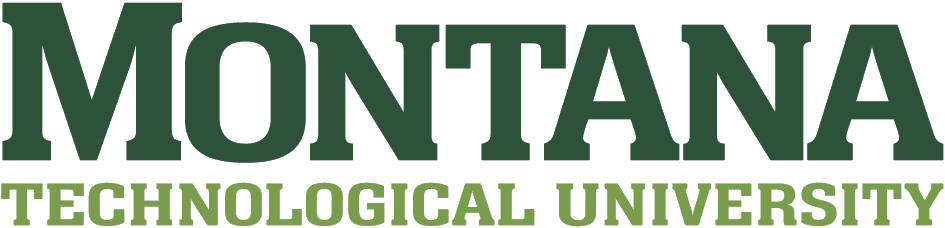

Montana Technological University, popularly known as Montana Tech, is a public university in Butte, Montana. Founded in 1900 as the "Montana State School of Mines", the university became affiliated with the University of Montana in 1994. After undergoing several name changes, in 2017 the Montana University System Board of Regents voted to designate Montana Tech as part of Special Focus Four-Year Universities, the only such designation in the Montana University System. To recognize this new designation and the greater independence with it, the name was officially changed in 2018 from "Montana Tech of the University of Montana" to "Montana Technological University". Montana Tech's focus is on engineering, applied and health science.

In fall 2017, Montana Tech had nearly 2,700 students. It has 13 campus buildings and offers 39 undergraduate degrees along with 15 minors, 5 certification degrees, and 9 pre-professional career programs. Montana Tech also offers 18 graduate degrees and has Ph.D. programs in Materials Science and Engineering, Interdisciplinary Studies, and Earth Science and Engineering.

== History ==
The Enabling Act of 1889, which brought Montana into the Union, allotted land for the creation of a school of mines as one of the four original Montana University System universities. In 1893 the Montana Legislature provided funding to establish the school in Butte. The cornerstone of Main Hall was laid in 1896, and the university opened its doors in 1900 as the "Montana State School of Mines". The first student was a woman, Clara Clark of Butte, and Nathan R. Leonard acted as the first president. Despite enthusiastic local support, even offers of free land for construction, the early history of the school was fraught with poor funding and accusations of fraud, but with the help of former governor John E. Rickards, the school was opened.

In 1919 the Montana Legislature established the Montana State Bureau of Mines and Metallurgy on the campus in keeping with Montana Tech as a school focusing on the development of minerals and industry. Charles H. Clapp of the mining department served as the first president of the Bureau.

The school was renamed the "Montana College of Mineral Science and Technology" in 1965. It began moving beyond purely engineering and applied sciences, adding social science and liberal arts options. Alumni Coliseum opened on campus.

The university became affiliated with the University of Montana in 1994 with a reorganization of the Montana University System. The name was changed to "Montana Tech of the University of Montana". The Butte Vocational-Technical Center was put under Montana Tech administration as the College of Technology. In 1998 Frank Gilmore became chancellor.

In 2010 the Natural Resource Building (NRB) opened. It now accommodates the Bureau of Mines and the Petroleum Engineering Department. In 2011 Don Blackketter became chancellor. In 2012 the College of Technology became Highlands College, and the Frank and Ann Gilmore University Relations Center (URC) building opened. The first Ph.D. program in Materials Science and Engineering began in 2014 in partnership with University of Montana and Montana State University. The Nursing Department began offering a full bachelor's degree in 2015. In October 2021, the university announced a $7 million donation to the Nursing Department from Dave and Sherry Lesar. This led to renaming the Nursing Department the Sherry Lesar School of Nursing. These funds also contributed to the construction of the Lesar Family Nursing Simulation Center, which opened in spring 2022 in the Science & Engineering building. In 2016, a full Bachelor's of Mechanical Engineering program was added, and the Natural Resource Research Center opened on campus, including a new nano research lab and additional lab space for existing departments.

In 2017 the Montana Board of Regents designated Montana Tech as part of Special Focus Four-Year Universities, the only such designation in the Montana University System, in recognition of Tech's focus on engineering, applied science and health science. This change gives greater independence by reporting directly to the Board of Regents and handling its own finances instead of through the University of Montana. To recognize this, in the summer of 2018, the school's name was changed to "Montana Technological University". Les Cook became chancellor in 2019.

On April 25, 2023, the university announced the largest donation in its history from Ryan Lance, CEO of ConocoPhillips. On September 21, 2023, the university's School of Mines and Engineering was officially renamed the Lance College of Mines and Engineering by unanimous vote of the Montana University System Board of Regents.

=== Presidents (1900–1994) and chancellors (1994–present) ===
1. Nathan R. Leonard, 1900–1909
2. Charles H. Bowman, 1909–1919
3. Charles H. Clapp, 1919–1921
4. George Warren Craven, 1921–1928
5. Francis Andrew Thomson, 1928–1950
6. J. Robert Van Pelt, 1951–1956
7. Edwin G. Koch, 1957–1971
8. Fred W. DeMoney, 1972–1985
9. Lindsay Norman Jr., 1986–1998
10. Frank Gilmore, 1998–2011
11. Don Blackketter, 2011–2019
12. Les Cook, 2019–2025
13. Johnny MacLean, 2025-present

== Academics ==
Montana Technological University offers 39 undergraduate degrees consisting of 11 associate degrees and 28 undergraduate majors, along with over 15 minors, 5 certification degrees, and 9 pre-professional career programs. Montana Tech also offers 18 graduate degrees including three Ph.D. programs in Materials Science and Engineering, Interdisciplinary Studies, and Earth Science and Engineering.

Montana Tech consists of four colleges:

- Lance College of Mines & Engineering
- College of Letters, Sciences, and Professional Studies
- Highlands College
- Graduate School

== Athletics ==
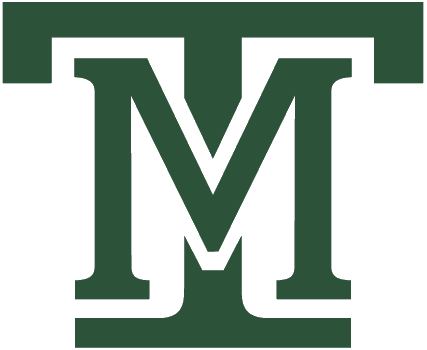
MTU athletics logo

The Montana Tech athletic teams are called the Orediggers, named after Butte's mining history. The university is a member of the National Association of Intercollegiate Athletics (NAIA), primarily competing in the Frontier Conference since the 1933–34 academic year.

Montana Tech competes in 12 intercollegiate varsity sports: men's sports include basketball, cross country, football, golf, and track & field (indoor and outdoor); women's sports include basketball, cross country, golf, track & field (indoor and outdoor), and volleyball.

== Reputation and rankings ==
In 2014, Montana Tech was ranked sixth in the nation for graduates earning the highest starting salaries, according to the Washington Post. In 2015, The Wall Street Journal ranked Montana Tech ninth in the nation for best public universities for return on investment.

Montana Tech has had 1 Fulbright Scholar, 3 Rhodes Scholar finalists, 11 Goldwater Scholars, and 5 Goldwater honorable mentions.

== Student life ==
Undergraduate demographics as of Fall 2023
| Race and ethnicity | Total |
|---|---|
| White | 82% |
| Hispanic | 5% |
| Unknown | 5% |
| Two or more races | 3% |
| American Indian/Alaska Native | 2% |
| Asian | 1% |
| Black | 1% |
| International student | 1% |
Economic diversity
| Low-income (Note: The percentage of students who received an income-based federal Pell grant intended for low-income students.) | 22% |
| Affluent (Note: The percentage of students who are a part of the American middle class at the bare minimum.) | 78% |

== Notable alumni ==
- Nate Harris, college basketball coach
- Don Heater, former NFL player
- Craig Kupp, former NFL player
- Ryan Lance, CEO of ConocoPhillips
- Mike Mansfield, former United States Senator
- Arnold Olsen, former United States Representative
- Tucker Wetmore, country singer-songwriter
