= Kirchhoff =

Kirchhoff, Kirchoff or Kirchhoffer is a German surname. Notable people with the surname include:

- Adolf Kirchhoff (1826–1908), German classical scholar and epigrapher
- Alfred Kirchhoff (1838–1907), German geographer and naturalist
- Alphonse Kirchhoffer (1873–1913), French Olympic fencer
- Bruce K. Kirchoff (born 1952), American botanist
- Charles William Henry Kirchhoff (1853-1916), American editor and metals expert
- Detlef Kirchhoff (born 1967), German rower
- Fritz Kirchhoff (1901–1953), German screenwriter, film producer and director
- Gustav Kirchhoff (1824–1887), German physicist — Kirchhoff's laws in electricity, spectroscopy, thermochemistry
- Gottlieb Kirchhoff (1764–1833), German chemist
- Jan Kirchhoff (born 1990), German footballer
- John Nesbitt Kirchhoffer (1848–1914), Canadian politician
- Mary Kirchoff (born 1959), American fantasy novelist
- Paul Kirchhoff (1900–1972), German anthropologist and ethnologist of pre-Columbian Mesoamerican cultures
- Robert Kirchhoff (born 1962), Slovak film director
- Richard A. Kirchhoffer (1890–1977), bishop of the Episcopal Diocese of Indianapolis
- Ulrich Kirchhoff (born 1967), German show jumper
- Walter Kirchhoff (1879–1951), German opera singer

== See also ==
- 10358 Kirchhoff, a main-belt asteroid
- Kirchhoff (crater), the lunar crater named for Gustav Kirchhoff
- Kirchhoff Institute of Physics, a research institute in Heidelberg, Germany
- Kirchhoff's laws, a group of laws of physics (in thermodynamics, electrical circuits, spectroscopy, and fluid mechanics) named for Gustav Kirchhoff
- Kirchhoff's theorem, in graph theory, a theorem concerning the number of "spanning trees" in a graph, named for Gustav Kirchhoff
- Kirchhof (disambiguation)
