= American Institute of Mining, Metallurgical, and Petroleum Engineers =

Professional organization

Coordinates: 39.577653°N 104.836782°W

- Type: Nonprofit, professional association
- Industry: Mining, petroleum
- Founded: 1871
- Founder: Thomas Egleston
- Headquarters: 5000 Executive Parkway, Suite 302, San Ramon, California, U.S.
- Website: aimehq.org

The American Institute of Mining, Metallurgical, and Petroleum Engineers (AIME) is a professional association for mining and metallurgy, with over 145,000 members. The association was founded in 1871 by 22 mining engineers in Wilkes-Barre, Pennsylvania, and was one of the first national engineering societies in the country.

The association's charter is to "advance and disseminate, through the programs of the Member Societies, knowledge of engineering and the arts and sciences involved in the production and use of minerals, metals, energy sources and materials for the benefit of humankind."

It is the parent organization of four Member Societies, the Society for Mining, Metallurgy, and Exploration (SME), The Minerals, Metals & Materials Society (TMS), the Association for Iron and Steel Technology (AIST), and the Society of Petroleum Engineers (SPE). The organization is currently based in San Ramon, California.

== History ==
Founded as the American Institute of Mining Engineers (AIME), the institute had a membership at the beginning of 1915 of over 5,000, made up of honorary, elected, and associate members. The annual meeting of the institute was held in February, with other meetings during the year as authorized by the council. The institute published three volumes of Transactions annually and a monthly Bulletin which appeared on the first of each month. The headquarters of the institute was in the Engineering Societies' Building in New York City.

Following creation of the Petroleum Division in 1922, the Iron and Steel Division in 1928 and the Institute of Metals Division in 1933 the name of the society was changed in 1957 to the American Institute of Mining, Metallurgical and Petroleum Engineers. Three of the current member societies were then created from the divisions, increasing to four in 1974 when the Iron and Steel Society (ISS) was formed. In 2004 ISS merged with the Association of Iron and Steel Engineers (AISE) to form the Association for Iron and Steel Technology (AIST) whilst remaining a member society of AIME.

== Awards ==
The society presents around 25 awards each year at its annual conference. Member societies also disburse their own awards, including the Percy Nicholls Award, awarded by SME jointly with American Society of Mechanical Engineers.

== Presidents ==
The following individuals have held the position of President of this organization.

- 1871: David Thomas
- 1872–1874: Rossiter Worthington Raymond
- 1875: Alexander Lyman Holley
- 1876: Abram Stevens Hewitt
- 1877: Thomas Sterry Hunt
- 1878–1879: Eckley Brinton Coxe
- 1880: William Powell Shinn
- 1881: William Metcalf
- 1882: Richard Pennefather Rothwell
- 1883: Robert Woolston Hunt
- 1884–1885: James Cooper Bayles
- 1886: Robert Hallowell Richards
- 1887: Thomas Egleston
- 1888: William Bleeker Potter
- 1889: Richard Pearce
- 1890: Abram Stevens Hewitt
- 1891–1892: John Birkinbine
- 1893: Henry Marion Howe
- 1894: John Fritz
- 1895: Joseph D. Weeks
- 1896: Edmund Gybbon Spilsbury
- 1897: Thomas Messinger Drown
- 1898: Charles Kirchhoff
- 1899–1900: James Douglas
- 1901–1902: Eben Erskine Olcott
- 1903: Albert Reid Ledoux
- 1904–1905: James Gayley
- 1906: Robert Woolston Hunt
- 1907–1908: John Hays Hammond
- 1909–1910: David William Brunton
- 1911: Charles Kirchhoff
- 1912: James Furman Kemp
- 1913: Charles Frederic Rand
- 1914: Benjamin Bowditch Thayer
- 1915: William Lawrence Saunders
- 1916: Louis Davidson Ricketts
- 1917: Philip North Moore
- 1918: Sidney Johnston Jennings
- 1919: Horace Vaughn Winchell
- 1920: Herbert Hoover
- 1921: Edwin Ludlow
- 1922: Arthur Smith Dwight
- 1923: Edward Payson Mathewson
- 1924: William Kelly
- 1925: John van Wicheren Reynders
- 1926: Samuel A. Taylor
- 1927: Everette Lee DeGolyer
- 1928: George Otis Smith
- 1929: Frederick Worthen Bradley
- 1930: William Hastings Bassett
- 1931: Robert Emmet Tally
- 1932: Scott Turner
- 1933: Frederick Mark Becket
- 1934: Howard Nicholas Eavenson
- 1935: Henry Andrew Buehler
- 1936: John Meston Lovejoy
- 1937: Rolland Craten Allen
- 1938: Daniel Cowan Jackling
- 1939: Donald Burton Gillies
- 1940: Herbert George Moulton
- 1941: John Robert Suman
- 1942: Eugene McAuliffe
- 1943: Champion Herbert Mathewson
- 1944: Chester Alan Fulton
- 1945: Harvey Seeley Mudd
- 1946: Louis S. Cates
- 1947: Clyde Williams
- 1948: William Embry Wrather
- 1949: Lewis Emanuel Young
- 1950: Donald Hamilton McLaughlin
- 1951: Willis McGerald Peirce
- 1952: Michael Lawrence Haider
- 1953: Andrew Fletcher
- 1954: Leo Frederick Reinartz
- 1955: Henry DeWitt Smith
- 1956: Carl Ernest Reistle Jr.
- 1957: Grover Justine Holt
- 1958: Augustus Braun Kinzel
- 1959: Howard Carter Pyle
- 1960: Joseph Lincoln Gillson
- 1961: Ronald Russel McNaughton
- 1962: Lloyd E. Elkins
- 1963: Roger Vern Pierce
- 1964: Karl Leroy Fetters
- 1965: Thomas Corwin Frick
- 1966: William Bishop Stephenson
- 1967: Walter R. Hibbard Jr.
- 1968: John Robertson McMillan
- 1969: James Boyd
- 1970: John C. Kinnear
- 1971: John Smith Bell
- 1972: Dennis L. McElroy
- 1973: James B. Austin
- 1974: Wayne E. Glenn
- 1975: James D. Reilly
- 1976: Julius J. Harwood
- 1977: H. Arthur Nedom
- 1978: Wayne L. Dowdey
- 1979: William H. Wise
- 1980: M. Scott Kraemer
- 1981: Robert H. Merrill
- 1982: Harold W. Paxton
- 1983: Edward E. Runyan
- 1984: Nelson Severinghaus, Jr.
- 1985: Norman T. Mills
- 1986: Arlen L. Edgar
- 1987: Alan Lawley
- 1988: Thomas V. Falkie
- 1989: Howard N. Hubbard, Jr.
- 1990: Donald G. Russell
- 1991: Milton E. Wadsworth
- 1992: Roshan B. Bhappu
- 1993: G. Hugh Walker
- 1994: Noel D. Rietman
- 1995: Frank V. Nolfi, Jr.
- 1996: Donald W. Gentry
- 1997: Leonard G. Nelson
- 1998: Roy H. Koerner
- 1999: Paul G. Campbell, Jr.
- 2000: Robert E. Murray
- 2001: Grant P. Schneider
- 2002: George H. Sawyer
- 2003: Robert H. Wagoner
- 2004: Robert C. Freas
- 2005: Alan W. Cramb
- 2006: James R. Jorden
- 2007: Dan J. Thoma
- 2008: Michael Karmis
- 2009: Ian Sadler
- 2010: DeAnn Craig
- 2011: Brajendra Mishra
- 2012: George W. Luxbacher
- 2013: Dale Heinz
- 2014: Behrooz Fattahi
- 2015: Garry W. Warren
- 2016: Nikhil Trivedi
- 2017: John G. Speer

== Vice presidents ==
- 1893–1894: Robert Gilmour Leckie

== Member societies ==
In addition to individual members, AIME's membership includes the following societies:

1. Association for Iron and Steel Technology (AIST)
2. The Society for Mining, Metallurgy & Exploration (SME)
3. Society of Petroleum Engineers (SPE)
4. The Minerals, Metals & Materials Society (TMS)

=== Mining Engineering magazine ===
The Society for Mining, Metallurgy & Exploration publishes the monthly magazine Mining Engineering since 1949.
