= Anti-submarine warfare =

Branch of underwater warfare

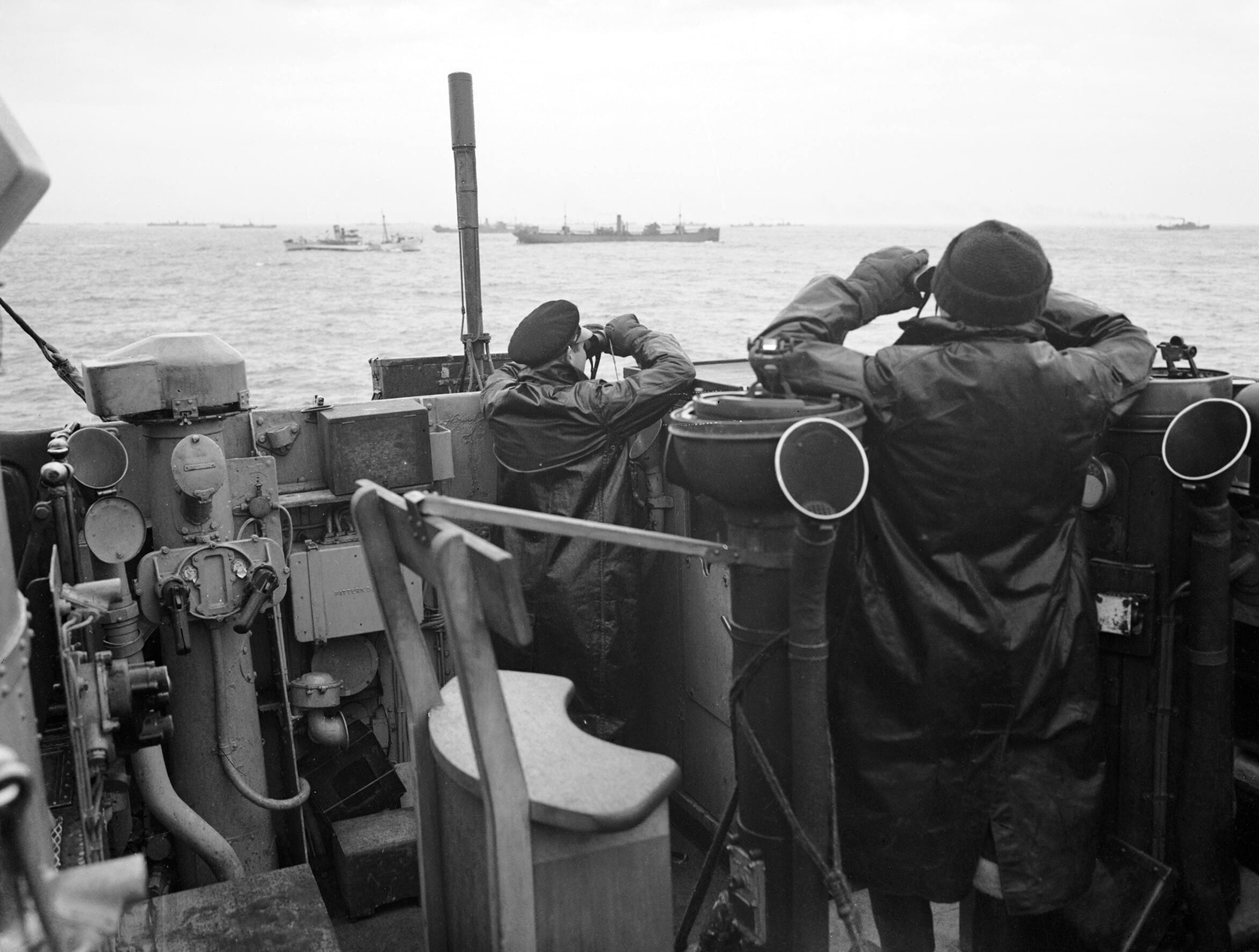
Royal Navy officers on the bridge of a destroyer on convoy escort duties keep a sharp look out for enemy submarines during the Battle of the Atlantic, October 1941

Anti-submarine warfare (ASW, or in the older form A/S) is a branch of underwater warfare that uses surface warships, aircraft, submarines, or other platforms, to find, track, and deter, damage, or destroy enemy submarines. Such operations are typically carried out to protect friendly shipping and coastal facilities from submarine attacks and to overcome blockades.

Successful ASW operations typically involve a combination of sensor and weapon technologies, along with effective deployment strategies and sufficiently trained personnel. Typically, sophisticated sonar equipment is used for first detecting, then classifying, locating, and tracking a target submarine. Sensors are therefore a key element of ASW. Common weapons for attacking submarines include torpedoes and naval mines, which can both be launched from an array of air, surface, and underwater platforms. ASW capabilities are often considered of significant strategic importance, particularly following provocative instances of unrestricted submarine warfare and the introduction of submarine-launched ballistic missiles, which greatly increased the lethality of submarines.

At the beginning of the 20th century, ASW techniques and submarines themselves were primitive. During the First World War, submarines deployed by Imperial Germany proved themselves to be a capable threat to shipping, being able to strike targets even out in the North Atlantic Ocean. Accordingly, multiple nations embarked on research into devising more capable ASW methods, resulting in the introduction of practical depth charges and advances in sonar technology; the adoption of the convoy system also proved to be a decisive tactic.

After a lull in progress during the interwar period, the Second World War saw submarine warfare and ASW alike advance rapidly, particularly during the critical Battle of the Atlantic, during which Axis submarines sought to prevent Britain from effectively importing supplies. Techniques such as the Wolfpack achieved initial success, but became increasingly costly as more capable ASW aircraft were introduced. Technologies such as the Naxos radar detector gained only a temporary reprieve until detection apparatus advanced yet again. Intelligence efforts, such as Ultra, also played a major role in curtailing the submarine threat and guiding ASW efforts towards greater success.

During the post-war era, ASW continued to advance, as the arrival of nuclear submarines had rendered some traditional techniques less effective. The superpowers of the era constructed sizable submarine fleets, many of which were armed with nuclear weapons; in response to the heightened threat posed by such vessels, various nations chose to expand their ASW capabilities. Helicopters, capable of operating from almost any warship and equipped with ASW apparatus, became commonplace during the 1960s. Increasingly capable fixed-wing maritime patrol aircraft were also widely used, covering vast areas of ocean. The magnetic anomaly detector (MAD), diesel exhaust sniffers, sonobuoys and other electronic warfare technologies also became a staple of ASW efforts. Dedicated attack submarines, purpose-built to track down and destroy other submarines, became a key component as well. Torpedo carrying missiles, such as ASROC and Ikara, were another area of advancement.

== History ==
=== Origins ===
The first attacks on a ship by an underwater vehicle are generally believed to have been during the American Revolutionary War, using what would now be called a naval mine but what was then referred to as a torpedo. Even so, various attempts to produce submarines had been made prior to this.

In 1866, British engineer Robert Whitehead invented the first effective self-propelled torpedo, the eponymous Whitehead torpedo; French and German inventions followed soon thereafter. The first submarine with a torpedo was Nordenfelt I, built in 1884–1885, though it had been proposed earlier. By the outbreak of the Russo-Japanese War in 1904, all the large navies except the Germans had acquired submarines. Nevertheless, at that time, all powers still defined the submarine as an experimental vessel and did not put it into operational use.

There were no means to detect submerged U-boats, and attacks on them were limited at first to efforts to damage their periscopes with hammers. The Royal Navy torpedo establishment, HMS Vernon, studied explosive grapnel sweeps; these sank four or five U-boats in the First World War. A similar approach featured a string of 70 lb (32 kg) charges on a floating cable, fired electrically; an unimpressed Admiral Edward Evans considered any U-boat sunk by it deserved to be.

Another primitive technique of attacking submarines was the dropping of 18.5 lb (8.4 kg) hand-thrown guncotton bombs. The Lance Bomb was also developed; this featured a 35–40 lb (16–18 kg) cone-shaped steel drum on a 5 ft (1.5 m) shaft, intended to be thrown at a submarine. Firing Lyddite shells, or using trench mortars, was tried. Use of nets to ensnare U-boats was also examined, as was a destroyer, HMS Starfish, fitted with a spar torpedo. To attack at set depths, aircraft bombs were attached to lanyards which would trigger their charges; a similar idea was a 16 lb (7.3 kg) guncotton charge in a lanyarded can; two of these lashed together became known as the Depth Charge Type A. Problems with the lanyards tangling and failing to function led to the development of a chemical pellet trigger as the Type B. These were effective at a distance of around 20 ft (6.1 m).

Perhaps the best early concept arose in a 1913 Royal Navy Torpedo School report, describing a device intended for countermining, a "dropping mine". At Admiral John Jellicoe's request, the standard Mark II mine was fitted with a hydrostatic pistol (developed in 1914 by Thomas Firth & Sons of Sheffield) preset for 45 ft (14 m) firing, to be launched from a stern platform. Weighing 1,150 lb (520 kg), and effective at 100 ft (30 m), the "cruiser mine" was also a potential hazard to the dropping ship.

=== First World War ===
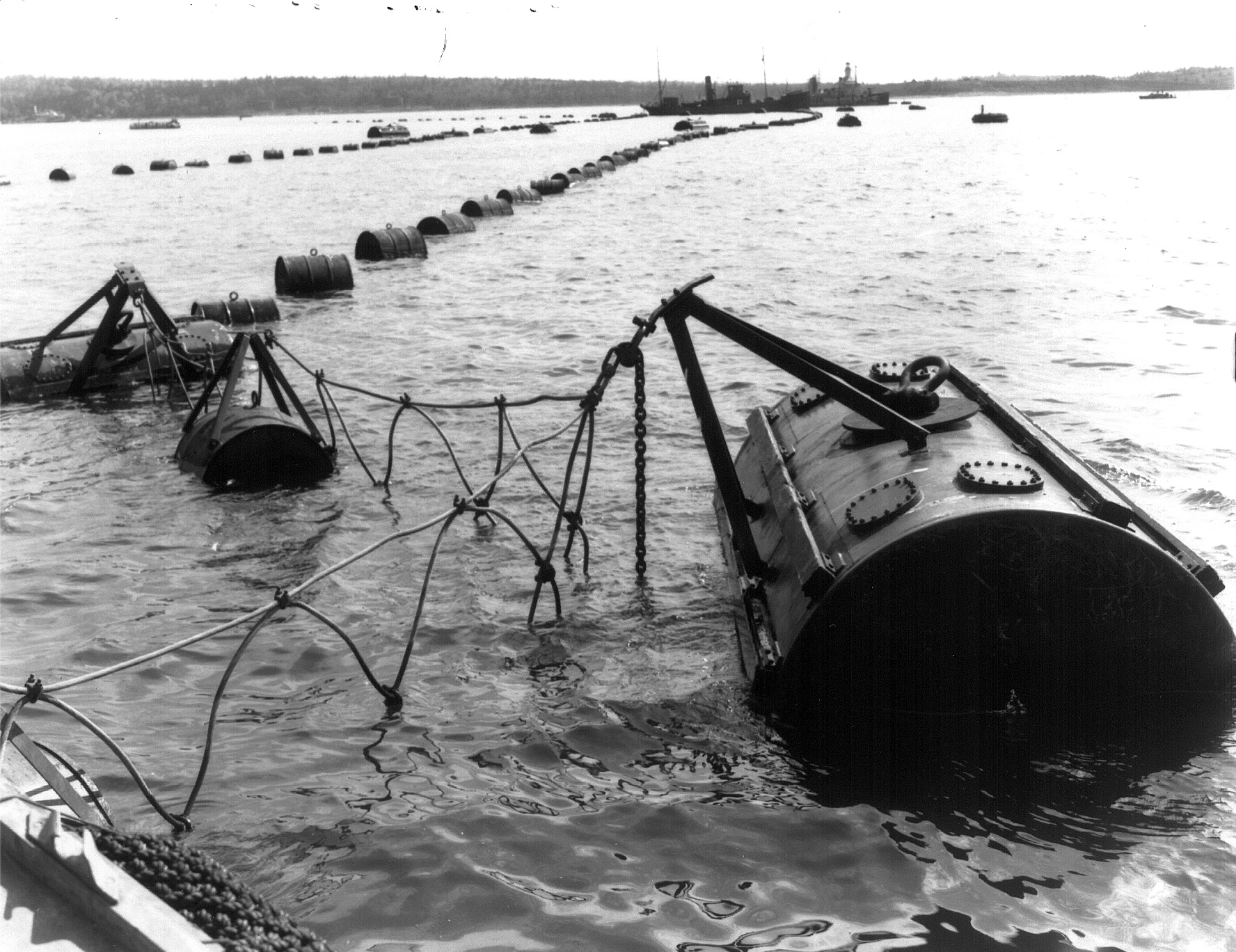
An example of an anti-submarine net, once protecting Halifax Harbour, Canada.

During the First World War, submarines were a major threat. They operated in the Baltic, North Sea, Black Sea and Mediterranean as well as the North Atlantic. Previously, they had been limited to relatively calm and protected waters. The vessels used to combat them were a range of small, fast surface ships using guns and good luck. They mainly relied on the fact a submarine of the day was often on the surface for a range of reasons, such as charging batteries or crossing long distances. The first approach to protect warships was chainlink nets strung from the sides of battleships, as defense against torpedoes. Nets were also deployed across the mouth of a harbour or naval base to stop submarines entering or to stop torpedoes of the Whitehead type fired against ships. British warships were fitted with a ram with which to sink submarines, and U-15 was thus sunk in August 1914.

During June 1915, the Royal Navy began operational trials of the Type D depth charge, with a 300 lb (140 kg) charge of TNT (amatol, as TNT supplies became critical) and a hydrostatic pistol, firing at either 40 or 80 ft (12 or 24 m), and believed to be effective at a distance of 140 ft (43 m); the Type D*, with a 120 lb (54 kg) charge, was offered for smaller ships.

In July 1915, the British Admiralty set up the Board of Invention and Research (BIR) to evaluate suggestions from the public as well as carrying out their own investigations. Some 14,000 suggestions were received about combating submarines. In December 1916, the Royal Navy set up its own Anti-Submarine Division (ASD), from which came the term "Asdic", but relations with the BIR were poor. After 1917, most ASW work was carried out by the ASD. In the U.S., a Naval Consulting Board was set up in 1915 to evaluate ideas. After American entry into the war in 1917, they encouraged work on submarine detection. The U.S. National Research Council, a civilian organization, brought in British and French experts on underwater sound to a meeting with their American counterparts in June 1917. In October 1918, there was a meeting in Paris on "supersonics", a term used for echo-ranging, but the technique was still in research by the end of the war.

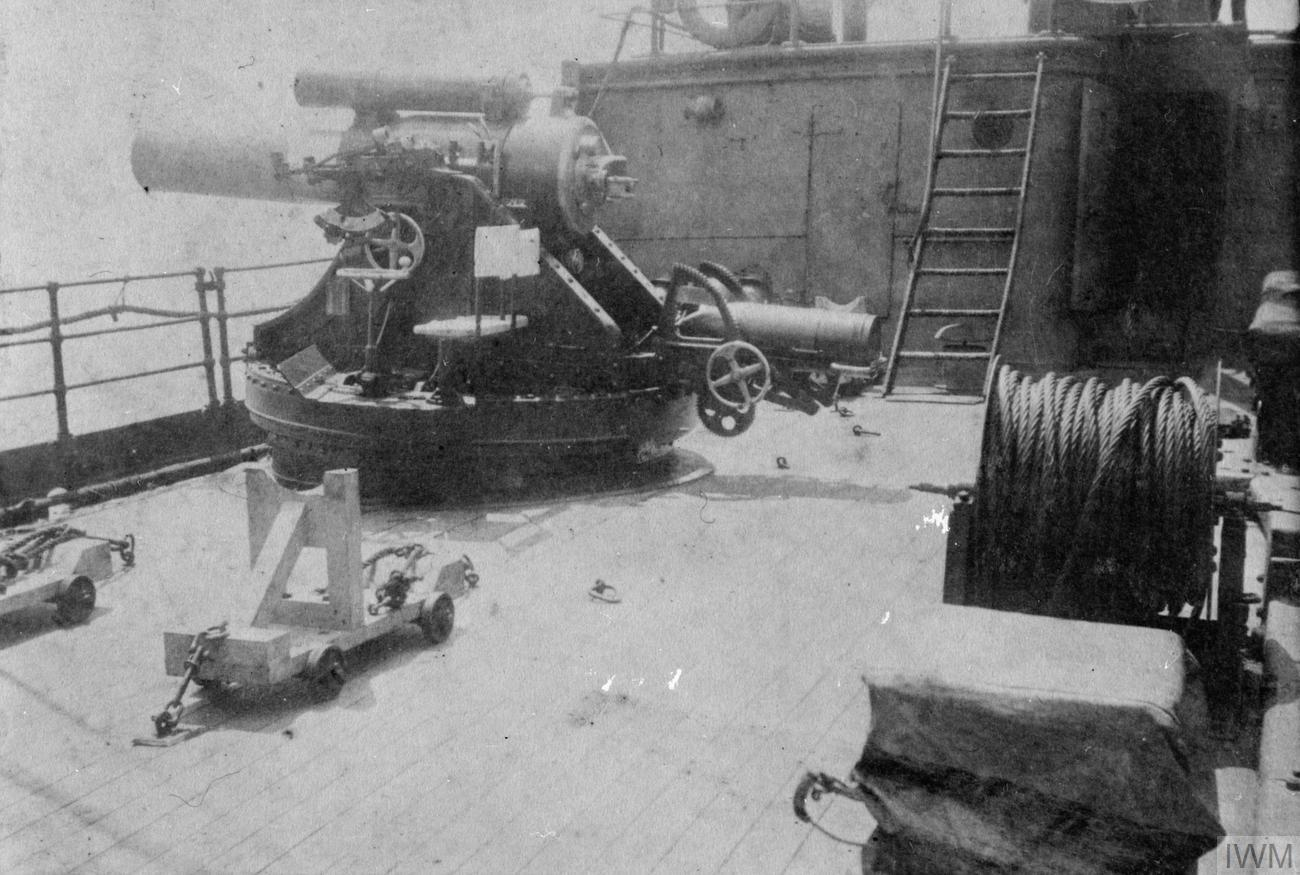
11-inch Howitzer Mk. I on British armed merchant cruiser HMS Patia in 1918, it had a range of just about 600 yards (550 m)

The first recorded sinking of a submarine by depth charge was U-68, sunk by Q-ship HMS Farnborough off County Kerry, Ireland on 22 March 1916. By early 1917, the Royal Navy had also developed indicator loops which consisted of long lengths of cables lain on the seabed to detect the magnetic field of submarines as they passed overhead. At this stage, they were used in conjunction with controlled mines which could be detonated from a shore station once a 'swing' had been detected on the indicator loop galvanometer. Indicator loops used with controlled mining were known as 'guard loops'. By July 1917, depth charges had developed to the extent that settings of between 50–200 ft (15–61 m) were possible. This design would remain mainly unchanged through the end of World War II. While dipping hydrophones appeared before the war's end, the trials were abandoned.

Seaplanes and airships were also used to patrol for submarines. A number of successful attacks were made, (Note: French Foucault bombed and sunk by Austrian aircraft,15 Sep 1915.; British B 10 sunk at moorings by Austrian aircraft, 9 August 1916.; German UB 32 bombed and sunk by RNAS seaplane, 22 September 1917.; British D 3 bombed in error by French airship, 12 March 1918.) but the main value of air patrols was in driving the U-boat to submerge, rendering it virtually blind and immobile.

However, the most effective anti-submarine measure was the introduction of escorted convoys, which reduced the loss of ships entering the German war zone around the British Isles from 25% to less than 1%. The historian Paul E. Fontenoy states that "[t]he convoy system defeated the German submarine campaign." A major contributing factor was the interception of German submarine radio signals and breaking of their code by Room 40 of the British Admiralty.

To attack submerged boats, a number of anti-submarine weapons were derived, including the sweep with a contact-fused explosive. Bombs were dropped by aircraft and depth charge attacks were made by ships. Prior to the introduction of dedicated depth charge throwers, charges were manually rolled off the stern of a ship. The Q-ship, a warship disguised as a merchantman, was used to attack surfaced U-boats, while the R1 was the first ASW submarine.

211 of the 360 U-boats were sunk during the war, using a variety of ASW methods:

Mines 58
Depth charges 30
Submarine torpedoes 20
Gunfire 20
Ramming 19
Unknown 19
Accidents 10
Sweeps 33
Other (including bombs) 2

=== Inter-war period ===
This period saw the development of active sonar (ASDIC) and its integration into a complete weapons system by the British, as well as the introduction of radar. During the period, there was a great advance due to the introduction of electronics for amplifying, processing, and displaying signals. In particular, the "range recorder" was a major step that provided a memory of target position. Because the propellers of many submarines were extremely loud in the water (although they did not seem so from the surface), range recorders were able to gauge the distance from the U-boat by sound. This would allow mines or bombs around that area to be detonated. New materials for sound projectors were developed. Both the Royal Navy and the U.S. Navy fitted their destroyers with active sonars. In 1928, a small escort ship was designed and plans made to arm trawlers and to mass-produce ASDIC sets.

Several other technologies were developed; depth sounders that allowed measurement by moving ships were a new innovation, along with a greater appreciation of the properties of the ocean that affected sound propagation. The bathythermograph was invented in 1937, which became a common fixture amongst ASW ships within only a few years. There were relatively few major advances in weapons during the period; however, the performance of torpedoes continued to improve.

=== Second World War ===
==== Battle of the Atlantic ====
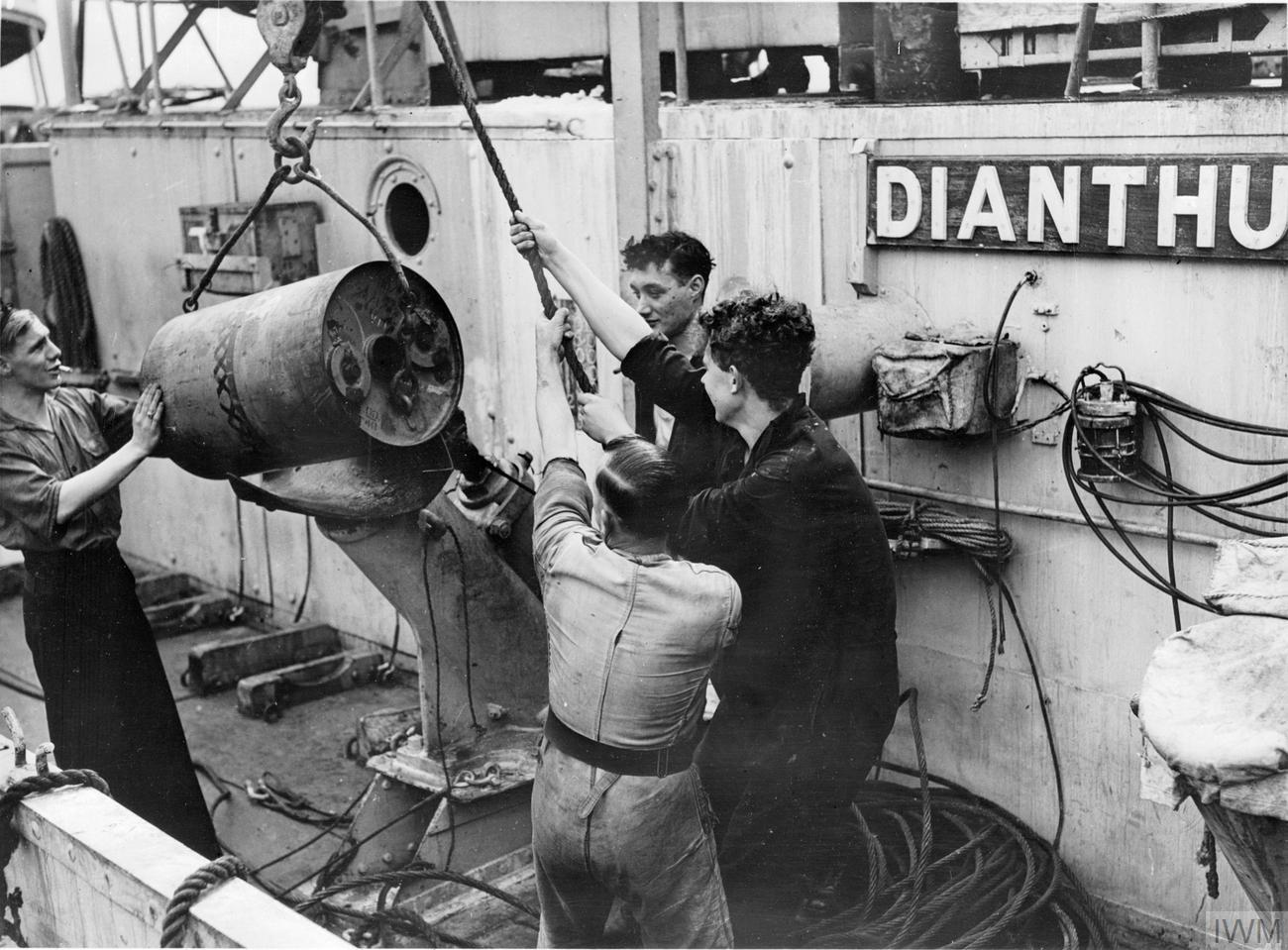
A depth charge thrower being loaded aboard corvette HMS Dianthus, 14 August 1942

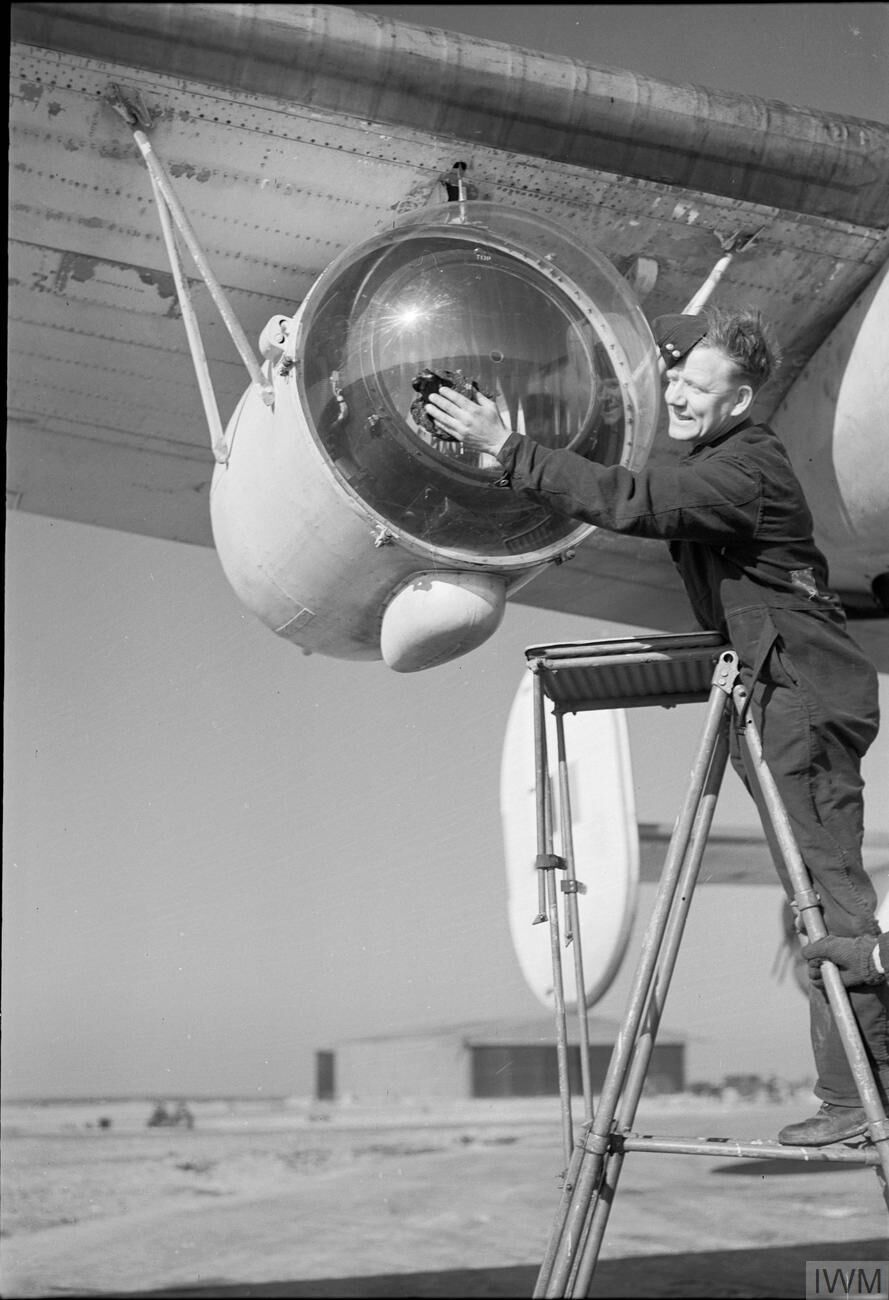
A Leigh Light fitted to a Liberator of Royal Air Force Coastal Command, 26 February 1944

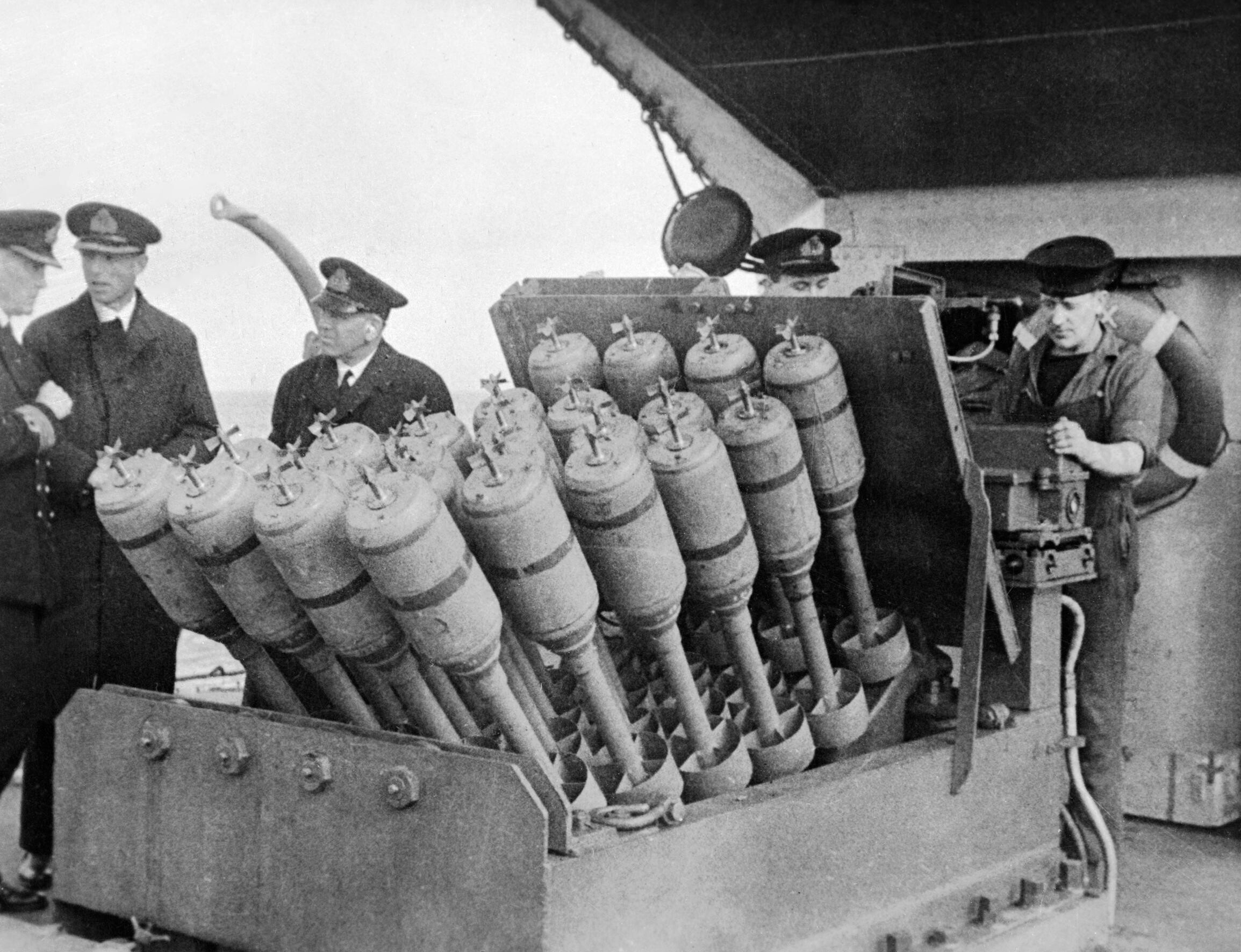
Hedgehog, a 24-barreled anti-submarine mortar, mounted on the forecastle of the destroyer HMS Westcott

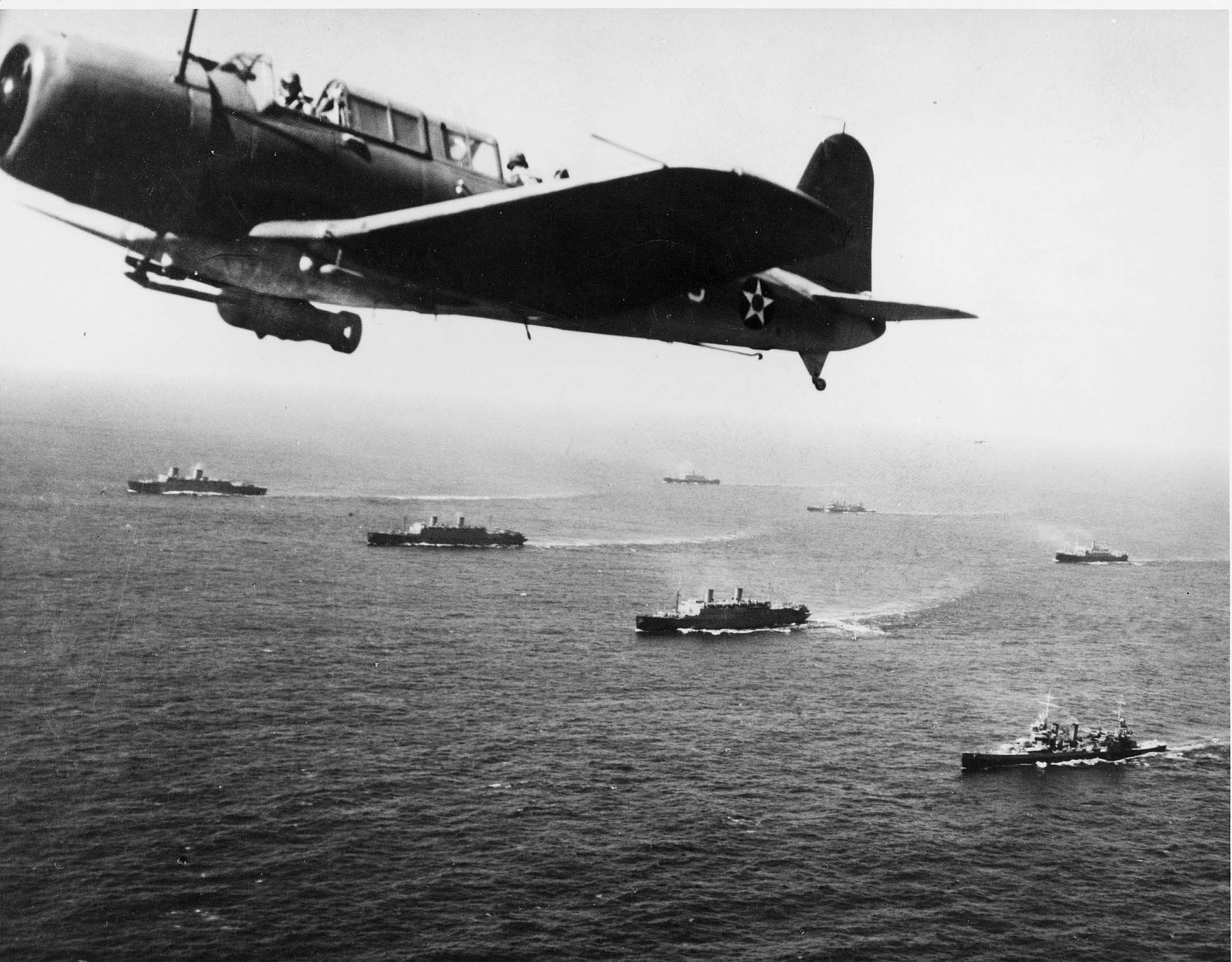
A Vought SB2U Vindicator from the USS Ranger flies anti-submarine patrol over Convoy WS12 en route to Cape Town, 27 November 1941.

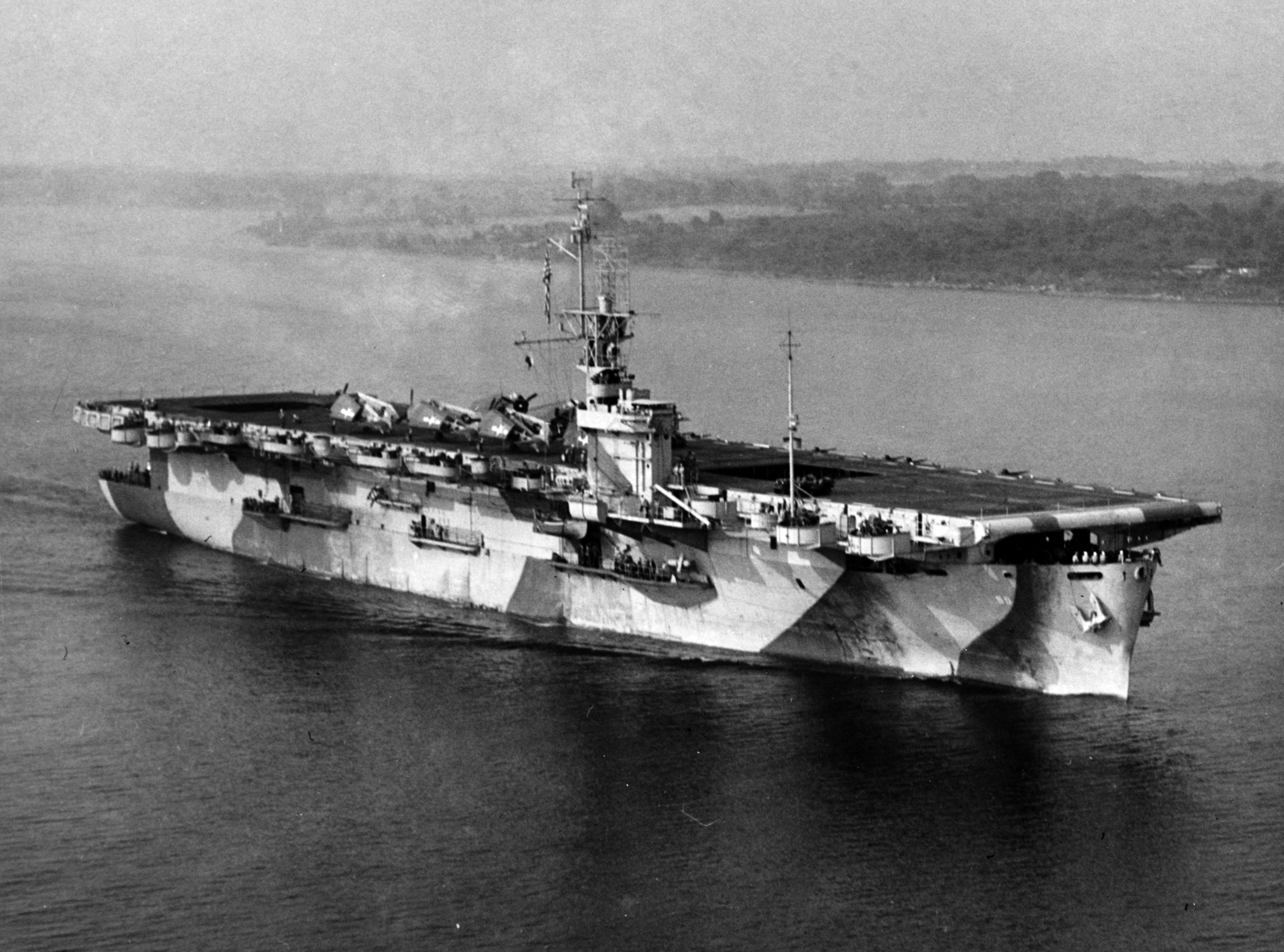
The USS Mission Bay operated primarily as an ASW carrier in the Atlantic. She is shown in August 1944 off the East Coast, wearing Measure 32 Design 4A camouflage. Note the Grumman F6F Hellcats on deck and the large SK air search radar antenna on the mast.

During the Second World War, the submarine menace revived, threatening the survival of island nations like Britain and Japan which were particularly vulnerable because of their dependence on imports of food, oil, and other vital war materials. Despite this vulnerability, little had been done to prepare sufficient anti-submarine forces or develop suitable new weapons. Other navies were similarly unprepared, even though every major navy had a large, modern submarine fleet, because all had fallen in the grip of Mahanian doctrine which held guerre de course could not win a war.

At the beginning of the conflict, most navies had few ideas how to combat submarines beyond locating them with sonar and then dropping depth charges on them. Sonar proved much less effective than expected, and was no use at all against submarines operating on the surface, as U-boats routinely did at night. (Note: In fact, Otto Kretschmer expressly forbade diving to avoid being detected by sonar. See The Golden Horseshoes.) The Royal Navy had continued to develop indicator loops between the wars but this was a passive form of harbour defense that depended on detecting the magnetic field of submarines by the use of long lengths of cable lain on the floor of the harbour. Indicator loop technology was quickly developed further and deployed by the US Navy in 1942. By then, there were dozens of loop stations around the world. Sonar was far more effective and loop technology for ASW purposes was discontinued shortly after the conflict's end.

The use and improvement of radar technology was one of the most important elements in the fight against submarines. Locating submarines was the first step in being able to defend against and destroy them. Throughout the war, Allied radar technology was much better than their German counterparts. German U-boats struggled to have proper radar detection capabilities and keep up with the successive generations of Allied airborne radar. The first generation of Allied airborne radar used a 1.7 meter wavelength and had a limited range. By the second half of 1942 the "Metox" radar detector was used by U-boats to give some warning from airborne attack. During 1943, the Allies began to deploy aircraft equipped with new cavity magnetron-based 10-centimeter wavelength radar (ASV III), which was undetectable by "Metox", in sufficient numbers to yield good results. Eventually the "Naxos" radar detector was fielded that could detect 10-cm wavelength radar, but it had a very short range and only gave a U-boat limited time to dive. Between 1943 and 1945, radar equipped aircraft would account for the bulk of Allied kills against U-boats. Allied anti-submarine tactics developed to defend convoys (the Royal Navy's preferred method), aggressively hunt down U-boats (the U.S. Navy approach), and to divert vulnerable or valuable ships away from known U-boat concentrations.

During the Second World War, the Allies developed a huge range of new technologies, weapons and tactics to counter the submarine danger. These included:

Vessels

- Allocating ships to convoys according to speed, so faster ships were less exposed.
- Adjusting the convoy cycle. Using operations research techniques, analysis of convoy losses over the first three years of the war showed that the overall size of a convoy was less important than the size of its escorting force. Therefore, escorts could better protect a few large convoys than many small ones.
- Huge construction programmes to mass-produce the small warships needed for convoy defense, such as corvettes, frigates, and destroyer escorts. These were more economical than using destroyers, which were needed for fleet duties. Corvettes were small enough to be built in merchant shipyards and used triple expansion engines. They could be built without using up scarce turbine engines and reduction gears, thus not interfering with larger warship production.
- Ships that could carry aircraft, such as the CAM ships, the merchant aircraft carrier, and eventually the purpose-built escort carriers.
- Support groups of escort ships that could be sent to reinforce the defense of convoys under attack. Free from the obligation to remain with the convoys, support groups could continue hunting a submerged submarine until its batteries and air supplies were exhausted and it was forced to surface.
- Hunter-killer groups, whose job was to actively seek out enemy submarines, as opposed to waiting for the convoy to come under attack. Later hunter-killer groups were centered around escort carriers.
- Huge construction programmes to mass-produce the transports and replace their losses, such as the American Liberty Ships. Once shipbuilding had ramped up to full efficiency, transports could be built faster than U-boats could sink them, playing a crucial role in the Allies winning the "Tonnage war".

Aircraft

- Air raids on the German U-boat pens at Brest and La Rochelle.
- Long-range aircraft patrols to close the Mid-Atlantic gap.
- Escort carriers to provide the convoy with air cover, as well as close the mid-Atlantic gap.
- High frequency direction finding (HF/DF), including shipborne sets, to pinpoint the location of an enemy submarine from its radio transmissions.
- The introduction of seaborne radar which could enable the detection of surfaced U-boats.
- Airborne radar.
- The Leigh light airborne searchlight, in conjunction with airborne radar to surprise and attack enemy submarines on the surface at night.
- Magnetic anomaly detection
- Diesel exhaust sniffers
- Sonobuoys

Weaponry

- Depth charges, the most used weapon, were improved during the course of the war. Starting with WW1 vintage 300-pound (140 kg) depth charges, a 600-pound (270 kg) version was developed. Torpex explosive, which is a 50% more powerful explosive than TNT, was introduced in 1943. Y-guns and K-guns were used to throw depth charges to the side of the escort vessel, augmenting the charges rolled off the stern and letting the escort vessel lay a pattern of depth charges
- The development of forward-throwing anti-submarine weapons such as Hedgehog and the Squid. This allowed the escort vessel to stay in contact with the submarine during an attack.
- The FIDO (Mk 24 'mine') air-dropped homing torpedo.
- When the German Navy developed an acoustic homing torpedo, torpedo countermeasures such as the Foxer acoustic decoy were deployed.

Intelligence
One of the best kept Allied secrets was the breaking of enemy codes including some of the German Naval Enigma codes (information gathered this way was dubbed Ultra) at Bletchley Park in England. This enabled the tracking of U-boat packs to allow convoy re-routings; whenever the Germans changed their codes (and when they added a fourth rotor to the Enigma machines in 1943), convoy losses rose significantly. By the end of the war, the Allies were regularly breaking and reading German naval codes.
To prevent the Germans from guessing that Enigma had been cracked, the British planted a false story about a special infrared camera being used to locate U-boats. The British were subsequently delighted to learn that the Germans responded by developing a special paint for submarines that exactly duplicated the optical properties of seawater.

Tactics
Many different aircraft from airships to four-engined sea- and land-planes were used. Some of the more successful were the Lockheed Ventura, PBY (Catalina or Canso, in British service), Consolidated B-24 Liberator (VLR Liberator, in British service), Short Sunderland, and Vickers Wellington. As more patrol planes became equipped with radar, U-Boats began to be surprised at night by aircraft attacks. U-Boats were not defenseless, as most U-Boats carried some form of anti-aircraft weapon. They claimed 212 Allied aircraft shot down for the loss of 168 U-boats to air attack. The German naval command struggled to find a solution to the aircraft attacks. 'U-Flak' submarines, equipped with extra anti-aircraft weapons, were tried unsuccessfully. At one point in the war, there was even a 'shoot back order' requiring U-boats to stay on the surface and fight back, in the absence of any other option. Some commanders started charging batteries during the day to gain more warning from air attack, and perhaps gain time to submerge. One solution was the snorkel, which allowed a U-boat to stay submerged and still charge its batteries. A snorkel made a U-boat more survivable and losses to aircraft went down. However, the low snorkeling speeds of 5 to 6 knots (9.3–11.1 km/h; 5.8–6.9 mph) greatly limited the mobility of the U-Boats.
The provision of air cover was essential. The Germans at the time had been using their Focke-Wulf Fw 200 Condor long range aircraft to attack shipping and provide reconnaissance for U-boats, and most of their sorties occurred outside the reach of existing land-based aircraft that the Allies had; this was dubbed the Mid-Atlantic gap. At first, the British developed temporary solutions such as CAM ships and merchant aircraft carriers. These were superseded by mass-produced, relatively cheap escort carriers built by the United States and operated by the US Navy and Royal Navy. There was also the introduction of long-ranged patrol aircraft. Many U-boats feared aircraft, as the mere presence would often force them to dive, disrupting their patrols and attack runs.
The Americans favored aggressive hunter-killer tactics using escort carriers on search and destroy patrols, whereas the British preferred to use their escort carriers to defend the convoys directly. The American view was that defending convoys did little to reduce or contain U-boat numbers, while the British and Canadians were constrained by having to fight the battle of the Atlantic alone for the early part of the war with very limited resources. There were no spare escorts for extensive hunts, and it was only important to neutralize the U-boats which were found in the vicinity of convoys. The survival of convoys was critical, and if a hunt missed its target a convoy of strategic importance could be lost. The British also reasoned that since submarines sought convoys, convoys would be a good place to find submarines.
Once America joined the war, the different tactics were complementary, both suppressing the effectiveness of and destroying U-boats. The increase in Allied naval strength allowed both convoy defense and hunter-killer groups to be deployed, and this was reflected in the massive increase in U-boat kills in the latter part of the war. The British developments of centimetric radar and the Leigh Light, as well as increased numbers of escorts, reached the point of being able to support U-boat hunting towards the end of the war, while earlier on, the advantage was definitely on the side of the submarine. Commanders such as F. J. "Johnnie" Walker of the Royal Navy were able to develop integrated tactics which made the deployment of hunter-killer groups a practical proposition. Walker developed a creeping attack technique, where one destroyer would track the U-boat while another attacked. Often U-boats would turn and increase speed to spoil the depth charge attack, as the escort would lose sonar contact as it steamed over the submarine. With the new tactic, one escort vessel would attack while another would track the target. Any course or depth change could be relayed to the attacking destroyer. Once a U-boat was caught, it was very difficult to escape. Since Hunter-Killer groups were not limited to convoy escort, they could continue an attack until a U-Boat was destroyed or had to surface from damage or lack of air.
The only recorded sinking of one submarine by another while both were submerged occurred in 1945 when HMS Venturer torpedoed U-864 off the coast of Norway. The captain of Venturer tracked U-864 on hydrophones for several hours and manually calculated a three-dimensional firing solution before launching four torpedoes.

==== Mediterranean ====
Italian and German submarines operated in the Mediterranean on the Axis side against Allied submarines from France and Britain submarines. The German Navy sent 62 U-boats to the Mediterranean; all were lost in combat or scuttled. German submarines first had to pass through the bottleneck of Straits of Gibraltar, where nine were sunk and a similar number damaged so severely they had to limp back to base. The Mediterranean is calmer than the Atlantic, which made escape for U-boats more difficult; the sea was also ringed with Allied air bases. Similar ASW methods were used as in the Atlantic but an additional menace was the use by Italians of midget submarines. Operating under the same clear-water conditions in the Mediterranean – such that British submarines were painted dark blue on their upper surfaces to make them less visible from the air when submerged at periscope depth – the Royal Navy, mostly operating from Malta, lost 41 submarines to the Axis forces, including HMS Upholder and Perseus.

==== Pacific Theatre ====
Japanese submarines pioneered many innovations, being some of the largest and longest range vessels of their type and were armed with the Type 95 torpedo. However, they ended up having little impact, especially in the latter half of the war. Instead of commerce raiding like their U-boat counterparts, they followed the Mahanian doctrine, serving in offensive roles against warships, which were fast, maneuverable and well-defended compared to merchant ships. In the early part of the Pacific War, Japanese subs scored several tactical victories, three successful torpedo strikes on the US fleet carriers Yorktown (CV-5), USS Saratoga and USS Wasp (CV-7), The Saratoga survived the attack and was repaired, while the Yorktown and Wasp were both abandoned and scuttled as a result of the attack. The USS North Carolina (BB-55) received a single torpedo in the same attack with the USS Wasp, causing it to miss critical naval actions of the Guadalcanal campaign.

Once the US was able to ramp up construction of destroyers and destroyer escorts, as well as bringing over highly effective anti-submarine techniques learned from the British from experiences in the Battle of the Atlantic, they would take a significant toll on Japanese submarines, which tended to be slower and could not dive as deep as their German counterparts. Japanese submarines, in particular, never menaced the Allied merchant convoys and strategic shipping lanes to any degree that German U-boats did. One major advantage the Allies had was the breaking of the Japanese "Purple" code by the US, so allowing friendly ships to be diverted from Japanese submarines and allowing Allied submarines to intercept Japanese forces.

In 1942 and early 1943, US submarines posed little threat to Japanese ships, whether warships or merchant ships. They were initially hampered by poor torpedoes, which often failed to detonate on impact, ran too deep, or even ran wild. As the US submarine menace was slight in the beginning, Japanese commanders became complacent and as a result did not invest heavily into ASW measures or upgrade their convoy protection to any degree to what the Allies in the Atlantic did. Often encouraged by the Japanese not placing a high priority on the Allied submarine threat, US skippers were relatively complacent and docile compared to their German counterparts, who understood the "life and death" urgency in the Atlantic.

However, US Vice Admiral Charles A. Lockwood pressured the ordnance department to replace the faulty torpedoes; famously when they initially ignored his complaints, he ran his own tests to prove the torpedoes' unreliability. He also cleaned out the "deadwood", replacing many cautious or unproductive submarine skippers with younger (somewhat) and more aggressive commanders. As a result, in the latter half of 1943, US subs were suddenly sinking Japanese ships at a dramatically higher rate, scoring their share of key warship kills and accounting for almost half of the Japanese merchant fleet. Japan's naval command was caught off guard; Japan had neither the anti-submarine technology or doctrine, nor the production capability to withstand a tonnage war of attrition, nor did she develop the organizations needed (unlike the Allies in the Atlantic).

Japanese antisubmarine forces consisted mainly of their destroyers, with sonar and depth charges. However, Japanese destroyer design, tactics, training, and doctrine emphasized surface nightfighting and torpedo delivery (necessary for fleet operations) over anti-submarine duties. By the time Japan finally developed a destroyer escort, which was more economical and better suited to convoy protection, it was too late; coupled to incompetent doctrine and organization, (Note: >Masahaya, Pearl Harbor Papers, himself calls IJN ASW efforts "shiftless".) it could have had little effect in any case. Late in the war, the Japanese Army and Navy used Magnetic Anomaly Detector (MAD) gear in aircraft to locate shallow submerged submarines. The Japanese Army also developed two small aircraft carriers and Ka-1 autogyro aircraft for use in an antisubmarine warfare role, while the Navy developed and introduced the Kyushu Q1W anti-submarine bomber into service in 1945.

The Japanese depth charge attacks by its surface forces initially proved fairly unsuccessful against U.S. fleet submarines. Unless caught in shallow water, a U.S. submarine commander could normally escape destruction, sometimes using temperature gradients (thermoclines). Additionally, IJN doctrine emphasized fleet action, not convoy protection, so the best ships and crews went elsewhere. Moreover, during the first part of the war, the Japanese tended to set their depth charges too shallow, unaware U.S. submarines could dive below 150 feet (45m). Unfortunately, this deficiency was revealed in a June 1943 press conference held by U.S. Congressman Andrew J. May, and soon enemy depth charges were set to explode as deep as 250 feet (76m). Vice Admiral Charles A. Lockwood, COMSUBPAC, later estimated May's revelation cost the navy as many as ten submarines and 800 crewmen.

Much later in the war, active and passive sonobuoys were developed for aircraft use, together with MAD devices. Toward the end of the war, the Allies developed better forward-throwing weapons, such as Mousetrap and Squid, in the face of new, much better German submarines, such as the Type XVII and Type XXI.

British and Dutch submarines also operated in the Pacific, mainly against coastal shipping.

=== Post-World War II ===
In the immediate postwar period, the innovations of the late war U-boats were quickly adopted by the major navies. Both the United Kingdom and The United States studied the German Type XXI and used the information to modify WW2 fleet boats, the US with the GUPPY program and the UK with the Overseas Patrol Submarines Project. The Soviets launched new submarines patterned on Type XXIs, the Whiskey and Zulu classes. Britain also tested hydrogen peroxide fuels in Meteorite, Excalibur, and Explorer, with less success.

To deal with these more capable submarines new ASW weapons were essential. This new generation of diesel electric submarine, like the Type XXI before it, had no deck gun and a streamlined hull tower for greater underwater speed, as well as more storage battery capacity than a comparable WW2 submarine; in addition, they recharged their batteries using a snorkel and could complete a patrol without surfacing. This led to the introduction of longer-ranged forward-throwing weapons, such as Weapon Alpha, Limbo, RBU-6000, and of improved homing torpedoes. Nuclear submarines, even faster still, and without the need to snorkel to recharge batteries, posed an even greater threat; in particular, shipborne helicopters (recalling the blimps of World War I) have emerged as essential anti-submarine platforms. A number of torpedo carrying missiles such as ASROC and Ikara were developed, combining ahead-throwing capability (or longer-range delivery) with torpedo homing.

Since the introduction of submarines capable of carrying ballistic missiles, great efforts have been made to counter the threat they pose; here, maritime patrol aircraft (as in World War II) and helicopters have had a large role. The use of nuclear propulsion and streamlined hulls has resulted in submarines with high speed capability and increased maneuverability, as well as low "indiscretion rates" when a submarine is exposed on the surface. This has required changes both to the sensors and weapons used for ASW. Because nuclear submarines were noisy, there was an emphasis on passive sonar detection. The torpedo became the main weapon (though nuclear depth charges were developed). The mine continued to be an important ASW weapon.

In some areas of the ocean, where land forms natural barriers, long strings of sonobuoys, deployed from surface ships or dropped from aircraft, can monitor maritime passages for extended periods. Bottom mounted hydrophones can also be used, with land based processing. A system like this SOSUS was deployed by the US in the GIUK gap and other strategically important places.

Airborne ASW forces developed better bombs and depth charges, while for ships and submarines a range of towed sonar devices were developed to overcome the problem of ship-mounting. Helicopters can fly courses offset from the ships and transmit sonar information to their combat information centres. They can also drop sonobuoys and launch homing torpedoes to positions many miles away from the ships actually monitoring the enemy submarine. Submerged submarines are generally blind to the actions of a patrolling aircraft until it uses active sonar or fires a weapon, and the aircraft's speed allows it to maintain a fast search pattern around the suspected contact.

Increasingly anti-submarine submarines, called attack submarines or hunter-killers, became capable of destroying, particularly, ballistic missile submarines. Initially these were very quiet diesel-electric propelled vessels but they are more likely to be nuclear-powered these days. The development of these was strongly influenced by the duel between HMS Venturer and U-864.

A significant detection aid that has continued in service is the Magnetic Anomaly Detector (MAD), a passive device. First used during the Second World War, MAD uses the Earth's magnetosphere as a standard, detecting anomalies caused by large metallic vessels, such as submarines. Modern MAD arrays are usually contained in a long tail boom (fixed-wing aircraft) or an aerodynamic housing carried on a deployable tow line (helicopters). Keeping the sensor away from the plane's engines and avionics helps eliminate interference from the carrying platform.

At one time, reliance was placed on electronic warfare detection devices exploiting the submarine's need to perform radar sweeps and transmit responses to radio messages from home port. As frequency surveillance and direction finding became more sophisticated, these devices enjoyed some success. However, submariners soon learned not to rely on such transmitters in dangerous waters. Home bases can then use extremely low frequency radio signals, able to penetrate the ocean's surface, to reach submarines wherever they might be.

A 2024 study found that climate change may decrease the detectability of submarines in certain locations.

== Modern warfare ==
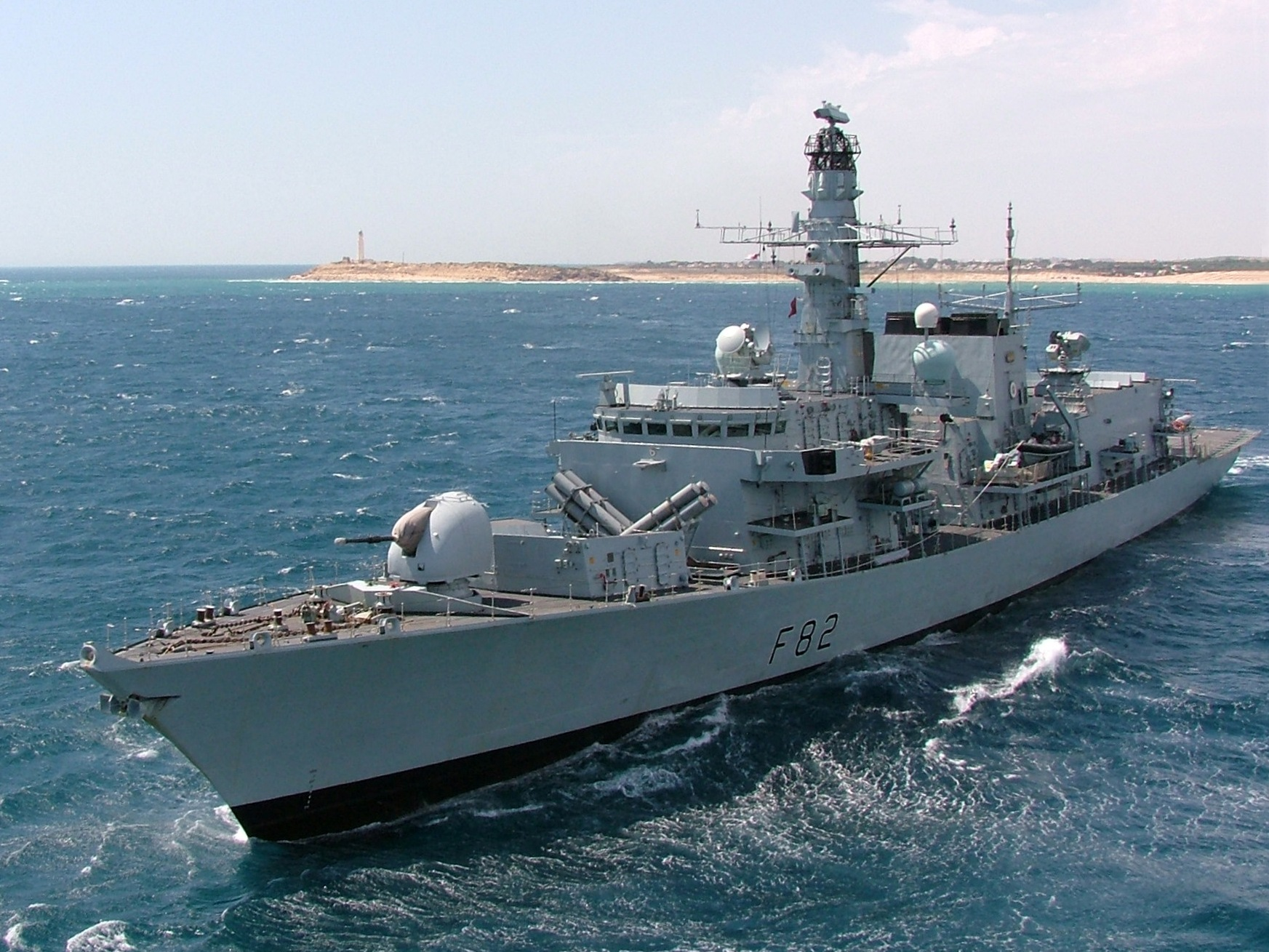
The Royal Navy Type 23 frigate is an advanced anti-submarine vessel.

The military submarine is still a threat, so ASW remains a key to obtaining sea control. Neutralizing the SSBN has been a key driver and this still remains. However, non-nuclear-powered submarines have become increasingly important. Though the diesel-electric submarine continues to dominate in numbers, several alternative technologies now exist to enhance the endurance of small submarines. Previously the emphasis had been largely on deep water operation but this has now switched to littoral operation where ASW is generally more difficult.

=== Anti-submarine warfare technologies ===
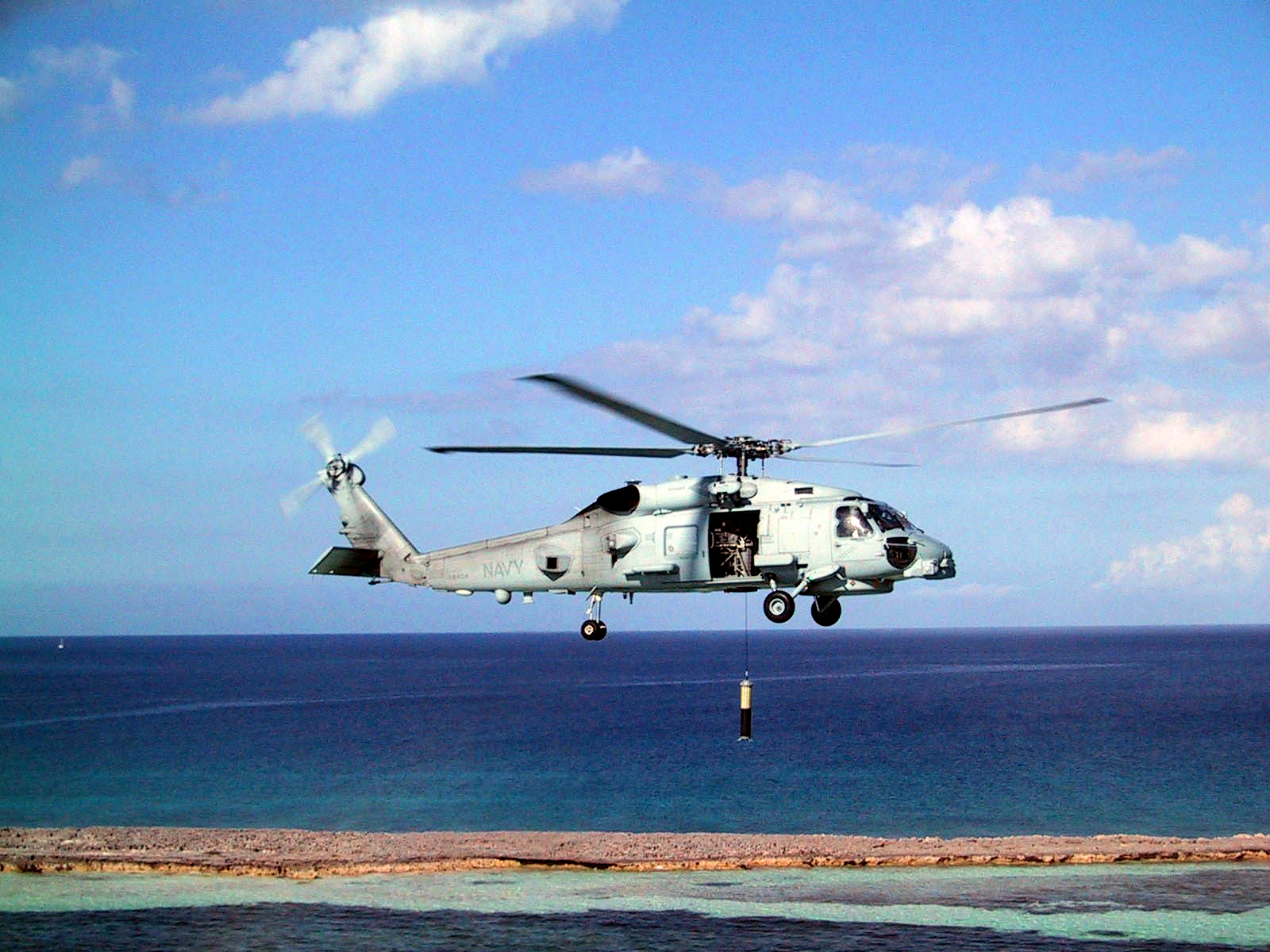
An MH-60R conducts an airborne low frequency sonar (ALFS) operation during testing and evaluation.

There are a large number of technologies used in modern anti-submarine warfare:

Sensors

- Acoustics particularly in active and passive sonar, sonobuoys, and fixed hydrophones aid in the detection of radiated noise. Sonar can be mounted on the hull or in a towed array.
- Pyrotechnics in the use of markers, flares and explosive devices
- Searchlights
- Radar, for surfaced parts
- High frequency radio direction finding (HF/DF or huff duff) to determine the bearings of U-boats.
- Hydrodynamic pressure wave (wake) detection
  - Submerged submarines may produce a Kelvin wake pattern depending on their speed and depth. Kelvins wakes are difficult to detect for submarines below the depth of 100m, however, submarines below 100m may still generate "internal wakes" that may be detectable from the surface.
- Laser detection and ranging of surfaced vessels; airborne and satellite
- Electronic countermeasures and acoustic countermeasures such as noise and bubble makers
- Passive acoustic countermeasures such as concealment and design of sound-absorbing materials to coat reflecting underwater surfaces
- Magnetic anomaly detection (MAD)
- Active and (more commonly) passive infra-red detection of surfaced parts and water anomalies.

In modern times forward looking infrared (FLIR) detectors have been used to track the large plumes of heat that fast nuclear-powered submarines leave while rising to the surface. FLIR devices are also used to see periscopes or snorkels at night whenever a submariner might be incautious enough to probe the surface.

=== Weapons ===
SMART (Supersonic Missile Assisted Release of Torpedo) Launch

- Anti-submarine Torpedoes (acoustic, wake homing, wire-guided) including aerial torpedoes
- Anti-submarine missiles including anti-submarine ballistic missiles
- Anti-submarine mortar
- Depth charges
- Anti submarine rocket
- Naval mines
- Anti-submarine net
- Ramming
- Nuclear depth bomb

=== Platforms ===
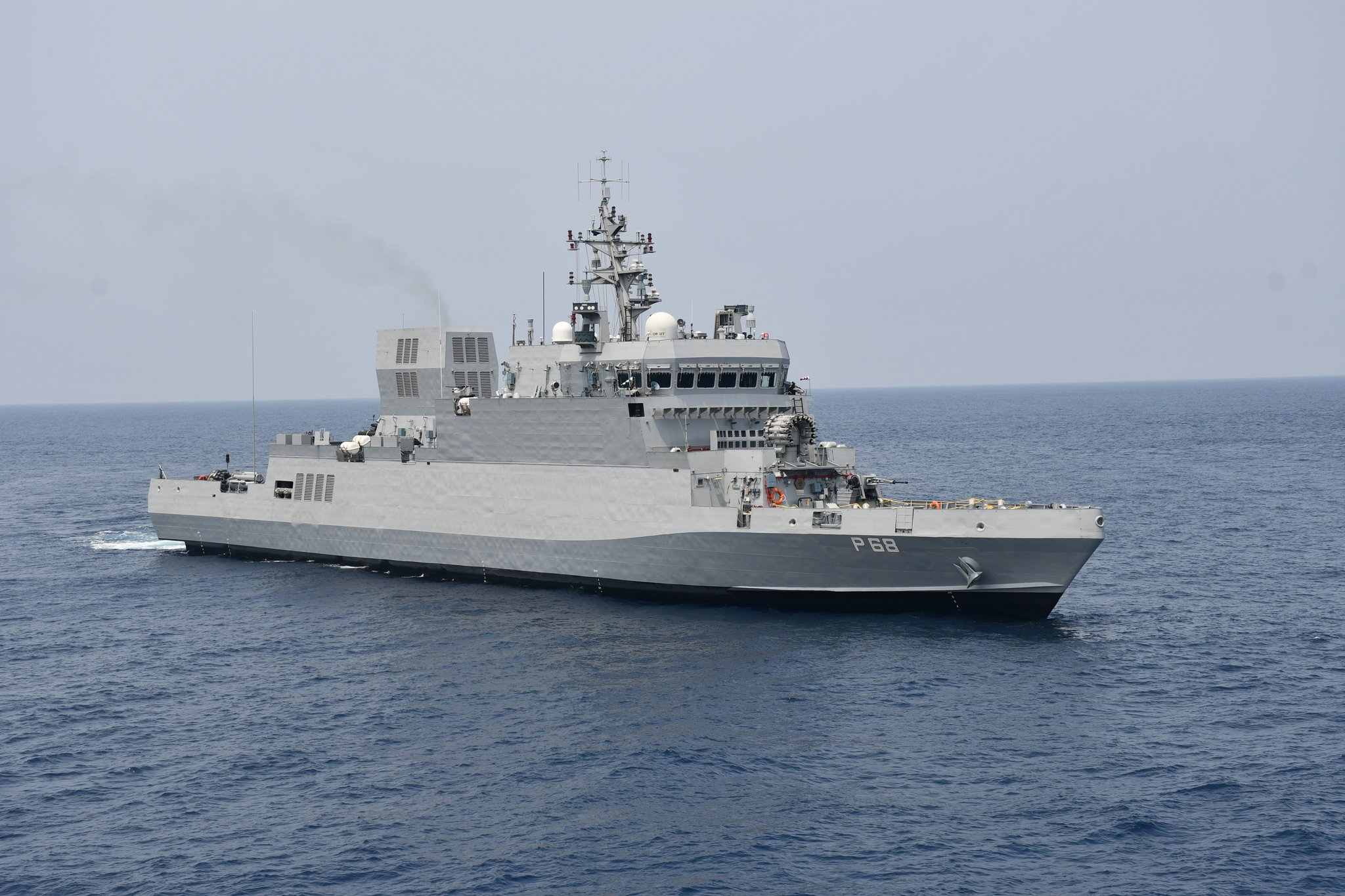
Dedicated Anti-Submarine Warfare Shallow Water Craft corvette of the Indian Navy

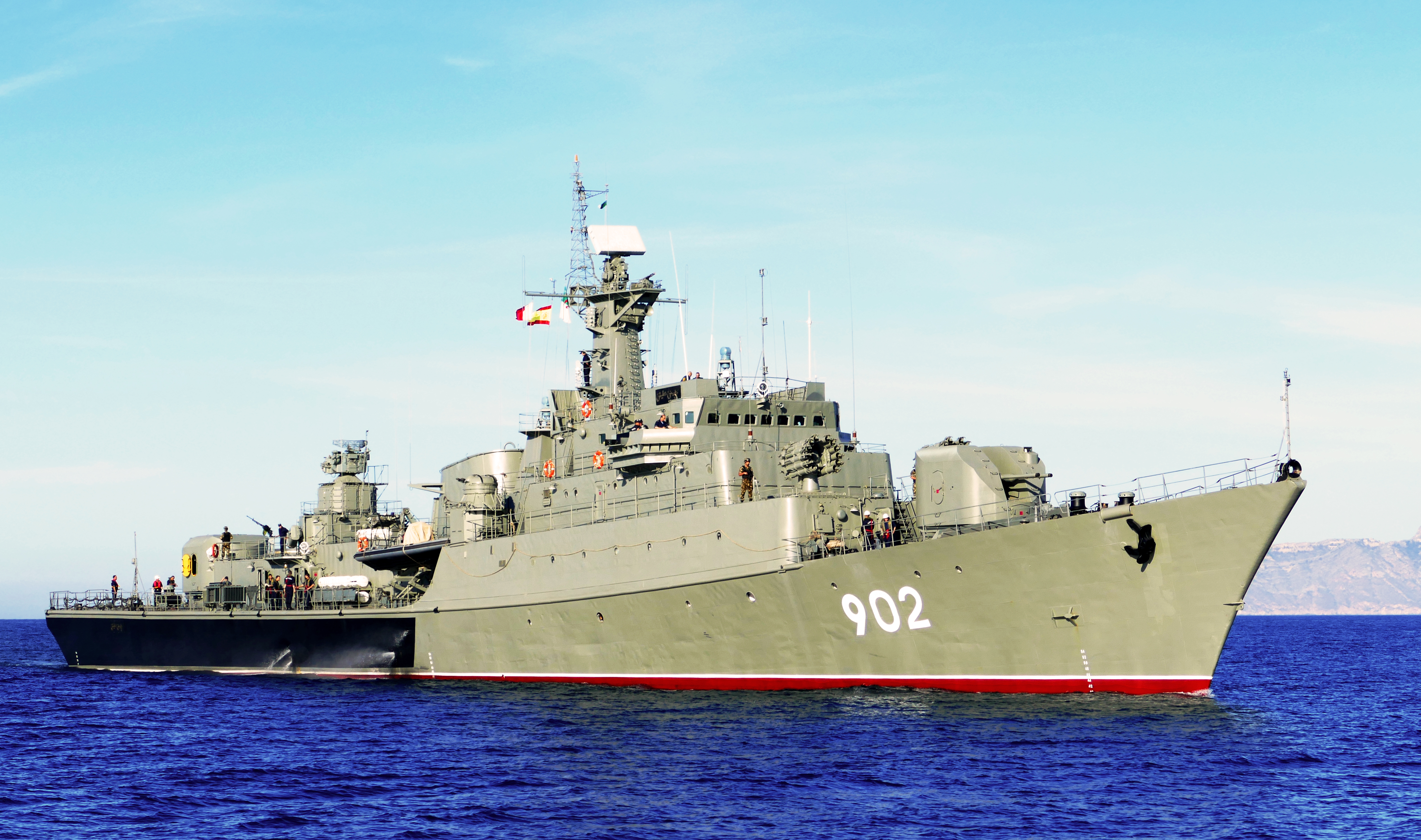
Algerian National Navy anti-submarine frigate Rais Kellik

Satellites have been used to image the sea surface using optical and radar techniques. Fixed-wing aircraft, such as the P-3 Orion & Tu-142 provide both a sensor and weapons platform similar to some helicopters like the Sikorsky SH-60 Seahawk, with sonobuoys and/or dipping sonars as well as aerial torpedoes. In other cases the helicopter has been used solely for sensing and rocket delivered torpedoes used as the weapon. Surface ships continue to be an important ASW platform because of their endurance, now having towed array sonars. Submarines are the main ASW platform because of their ability to change depth and their quietness, which aids detection.

In early 2010 DARPA began funding the ACTUV programme to develop a semi-autonomous oceangoing unmanned naval vessel.

Today some nations have seabed listening devices capable of tracking submarines. It is possible to detect man-made marine noises across the southern Indian Ocean from South Africa to New Zealand. Some of the SOSUS arrays have been turned over to civilian use and are now used for marine research.

Several countries developed anti-submarine missiles including United States, Russia, China, South Korea, Japan and India. Anti-submarine missiles give flexibility in terms of the launch platform. India developed supersonic long range anti-submarine missile called SMART. The missile helps to deliver torpedo 643 km away.

== Identifying friendly vs hostile submarines ==
In World War I, eight submarines were sunk by friendly fire and in World War II nearly twenty were sunk this way. Still, IFF was not regarded as a high concern before the 1990s by the US military as comparatively few non-allied nations possessed submarines.

IFF methods that are analogous to aircraft IFF have been deemed unfeasible for submarines because they would make submarines easier to detect. Thus, having friendly submarines broadcast a signal, or somehow increase the submarine's signature (based on acoustics, magnetic fluctuations etc.), are not considered viable. Instead, submarine IFF is done based on carefully defining areas of operation. Each friendly submarine is assigned a patrol area, where the presence of any other submarine is deemed hostile and open to attack. Further, within these assigned areas, surface ships and aircraft refrain from any anti-submarine warfare (ASW); only the resident submarine may target other submarines in its own area. Ships and aircraft may still engage in ASW in areas that have not been assigned to any friendly submarines. Navies also use database of acoustic signatures to attempt to identify the submarine, but acoustic data can be ambiguous and several countries deploy similar classes of submarines.

== See also ==
- Anti-submarine weapon
- Naval tactics
- Naval tactics in the Age of Steam
