= Andy Hunt =

Andy or Andrew Hunt may refer to:

- Andy Hunt (author), author and publisher of books on software
- Andy Hunt (footballer) (born 1970), former English football player
- Andrew Hunt (historian) (born 1968), history professor at the University of Waterloo
- Andrew Hunt (painter) (1790–1861), landscape-painter
- Andrew Murray Hunt, engineer who served on the Naval Consulting Board
