= Sniffer =

Sniffer may refer to:

- Packet analyzer (aka network analyzer, protocol analyzer or sniffer), computer software or hardware that can intercept and log traffic passing over a digital network
- The trademark for the original Network General Sniffer protocol analyzer
- Autolycus (submarine detector) (aka sniffer), a device to detect diesel exhaust fumes from a submarine
- Allan Clarke (footballer), the Leeds Utd, Fulham and England striker known by that nickname
- A slang term for intoxicative inhalants
- Sniffer (Anwar Ka Ajab Kissa), a 2013 Indian film directed by Buddhadev Dasgupta
