= William Metcalf (manufacturer) =

American businessman (1838–1909)

- Born: September 3, 1838; Pittsburgh
- Died: December 5, 1909 (aged 71); Pittsburgh
- Resting place: Allegheny Cemetery
- Education: Rensselaer Polytechnic Institute

William Metcalf (3 September 1838 – 5 December 1909) was an American steel manufacturer.

Metcalf was born at Pittsburgh, Pennsylvania, and graduated from Rensselaer Polytechnic Institute. Troy, New York, in 1858. In 1860–65, he had charge of the manufacture of the heavy Rodman and Dahlgren guns at the Fort Pitt Foundry in Pittsburgh, where most of the heavy artillery used by the Federal government during the Civil War was made.

After 1868 he was engaged continuously in steel manufacturing, and in 1897 he organized the Braeburn Steel Company, of which he was the head until his death. He is credited with having made the first crucible steel in America. In 1881 he served as president of the American Institute of Mining Engineers and in 1893 he held the presidency of the American Society of Civil Engineers. He published Steel – A manual for Steel-Users (1896).

He died in Pittsburgh on December 5, 1909.

== Publications ==
- Metcalf, William (1896). Steel: A Manual for Steel Users. New York: Kessinger Publishing, J. Wiley & Sons. ISBN 0-548-62507-7. OCLC 2105573.

== Legacy ==
- William Metcalf Award of the Engineer's Society of Western Pennsylvania.
