= Lawrence Addicks =

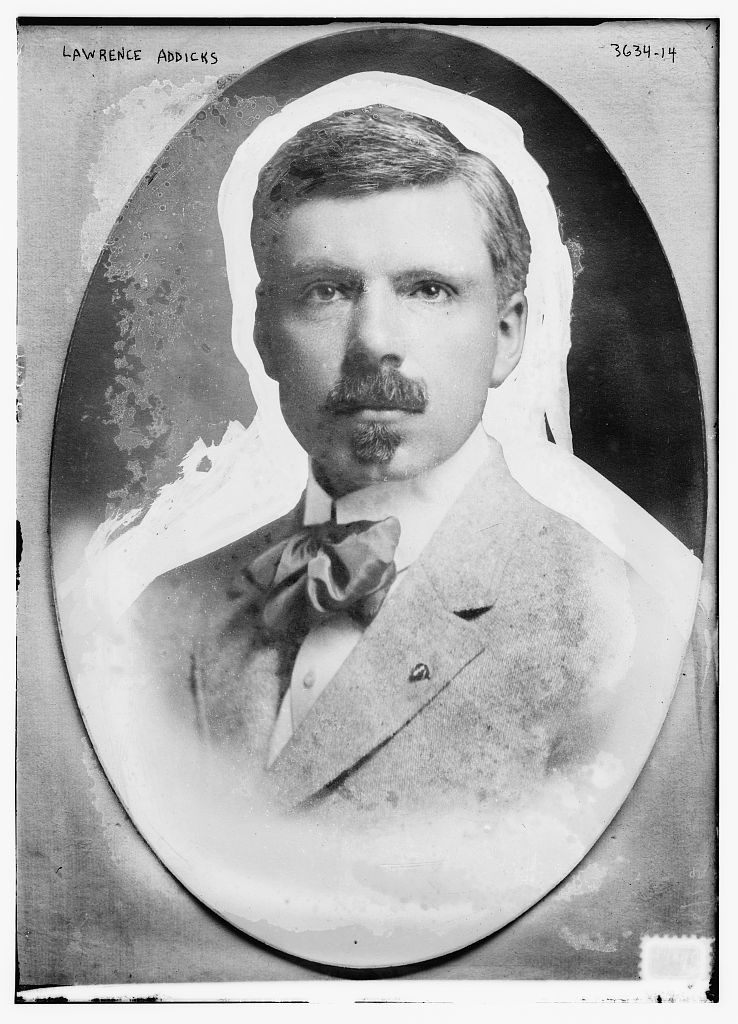
- Addicks circa 1915

President of the Electrochemical Society
- In office 1915–1916

Personal details
- Born: March 3, 1878 Philadelphia, Pennsylvania
- Died: January 16, 1964 (aged 85) Maryland
- Parent(s): Charles H. Addicks; Mary Knox Buzby
- Education: Massachusetts Institute of Technology

Lawrence Addicks (March 3, 1878 - January 16, 1964) was president of the Electrochemical Society from 1915 to 1916. He was a member of the Naval Consulting Board during World War I starting in 1915.

== Biography ==
He was born on March 3, 1878, in Philadelphia, Pennsylvania, to Charles H. Addicks and Mary Knox Buzby. He attended the Massachusetts Institute of Technology and graduated in 1889. He married Mary Maulsby O'Brien (1878-1964).

He was president of the Electrochemical Society from 1915 to 1916. He was a member of the Naval Consulting Board during World War I starting in 1915.

He died on January 16, 1964, in Maryland. He was buried in Christ Church Cemetery in Forest Hill, Maryland.
