= Naval Consulting Board =

Former US Navy organization

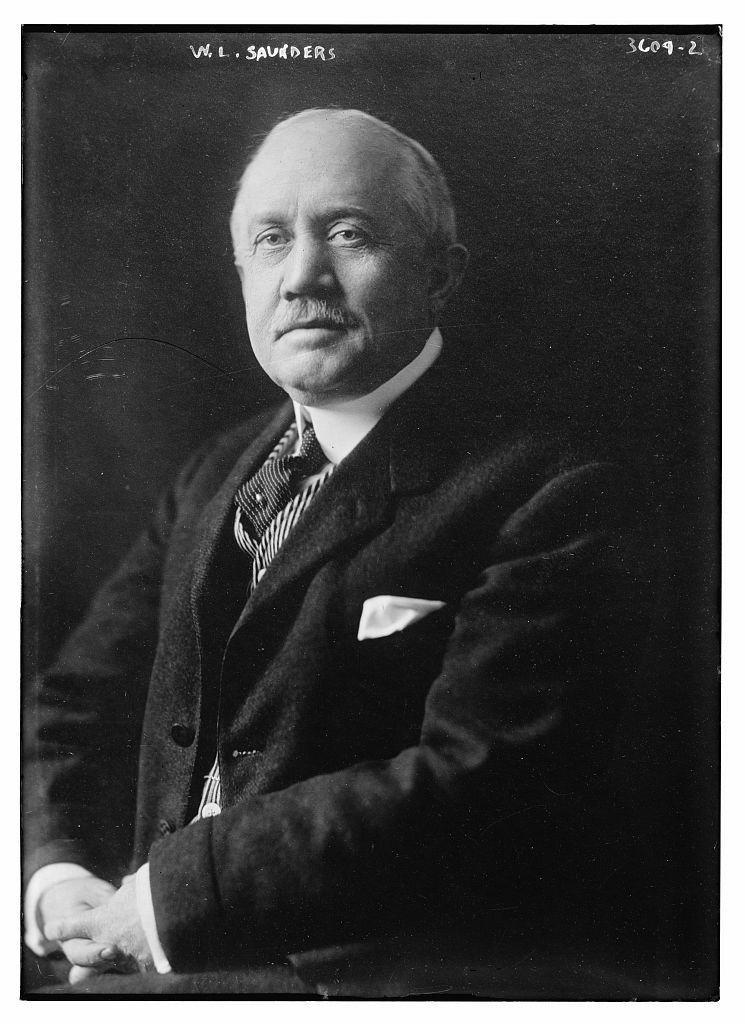
William Lawrence Saunders was chairman of the Naval Consulting Board in 1916

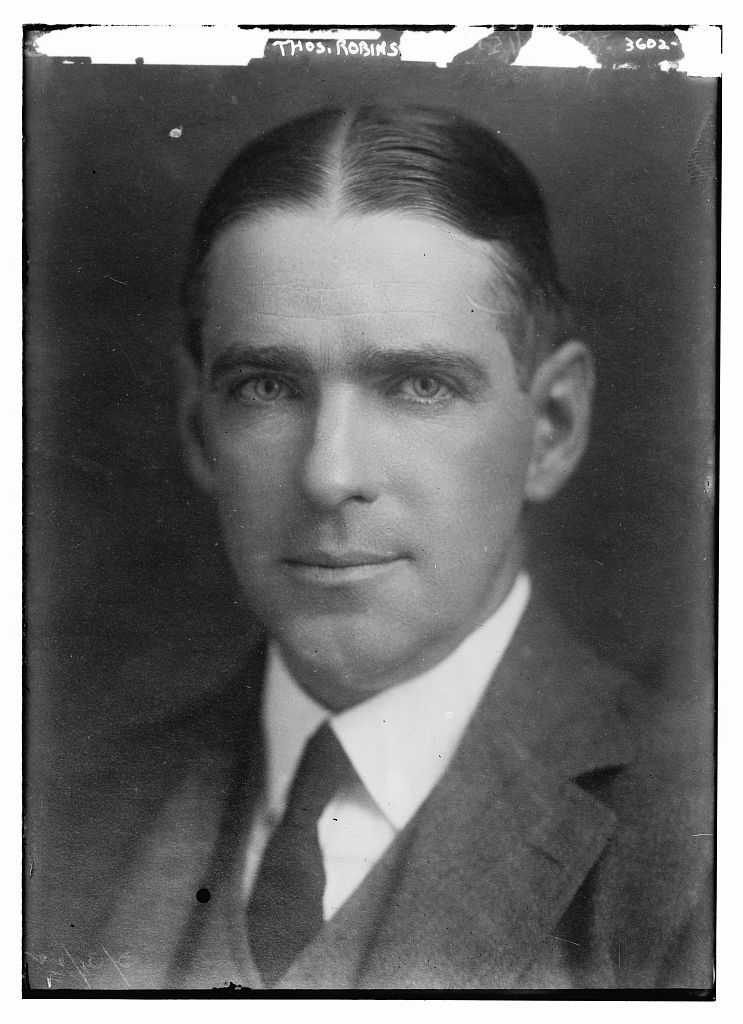
Thomas Robins was an American inventor involved in the Naval Consulting Board.

The Naval Consulting Board, also known as the Naval Advisory Board (a name used in the 1880s for two previous committees), was a US Navy organization established in 1915 by Josephus Daniels, the Secretary of the Navy at the suggestion of Thomas Alva Edison. Daniels created the Board with membership drawn from eleven engineering and scientific organizations two years before the United States entered World War I to provide the country with the "machinery and facilities for utilizing the natural inventive genius of Americans to meet the new conditions of warfare." Daniels was concerned that the U.S. was unprepared for the new conditions of warfare and that they needed access to the newest technology.

== History ==
Thomas Edison gave a speech in which he proposed a group of scientists should be involved with the World War I effort. In a statement issued in the New York Times on September 13, 1915, Josephus Daniels, the Secretary of the Navy asked Thomas Edison to be president of an advisory board. Miller Reese Hutchison who was Edison's chief engineer also became part of the Board. Secretary Daniels "approached eleven engineering and scientific societies to nominate two members to present their society on the Board." There were 24 original members, including the following:

- American Chemical Society
  - Willis Rodney Whitney
  - Leo Baekeland
- American Institute of Electrical Engineers
  - Frank Julian Sprague
  - Benjamin Garver Lamme
- American Mathematical Society
  - Robert Simpson Woodward, a civil engineer, physicist and mathematician.
  - Arthur Gordon Webster
- American Society of Civil Engineers
  - Andrew Murray Hunt
  - Alfred Wingate Craven, Chief Engineer of the New York city Rapid Transit commission.
- American Aeronautical Society
  - Matthew Bacon Sellers Jr.
  - Hudson Maxim
- The Inventor's Guild
  - Peter Cooper Hewitt
  - Thomas Robins
- American Society of Automotive Engineers
  - Andrew J. Riker
  - Howard E. Coffin
- American Institute of Mining Engineers
  - William Lawrence Saunders
  - Benjamin Bowditch Thayer
- American ElectroChemical Society
  - Joseph William Richards
  - Lawrence Addicks
- American Society of Mechanical Engineers
  - William Le Roy Emmet
  - Spencer Miller
- American Society of Aeronautic Engineers, merged into Society of Automotive Engineers (SAE) in 1916.
  - Henry Alexander Wise Wood
  - Elmer Sperry

Later, the physicists Arthur Compton, Robert Andrews Millikan and Lee De Forest, inventor of the radio tube and William Lawrence Saunders later replaced Edison as chairman.

Initially the board had no legal status, budget or staff, and its mission was unclear. Not until August 1916 did the United States Congress appropriate $25,000 for its operation.

The initial publicity surrounding its creation resulted in a flood of suggestions about how to improve the US Navy's ships, totaling 110,000 during the war. The Board's members decided that they could be most effective if they divided into technical committees to utilize their specialist expertise, including the Committee on Aeronautics and Aeronautical Motors. They provided consultants and arranged for research to be carried out in established civilian laboratories.

During World War I, the board was responsible for approving camouflage schemes for civilian ships, including one invented by William MacKay. One of the most significant committees was that on Industrial Preparedness, which drew up an inventory of manufacturing capacity and sought to develop common manufacturing standards.

On 10 February 1917 the Board established a Special Problems Committee with a Subcommittee on Submarine Detection by Sound. This led to the collaboration of the Submarine Signal Company, engaged in acoustic research and producer of submarine signals devices since 1901, the Western Electric Company and General Electric Company in experiments on the problem. An experimental station was established at Nahant, Massachusetts.

On May 11, 1917 the United States Secretary of the Navy created a Special Board on Antisubmarine Detection "for the purpose of procuring either through original research, experiment and manufacture, or through development of ideas and devices submitted by inventors at large, suitable apparatus for both offensive and defensive operations against submarines". Dr. Millikan of the United States National Research Council, Dr. Whitney of the General Electric Co., Dr. Jewett of the Western Electric Co., and Mr. Fay of the Submarine Signal Co. were appointed as advisory members.
