= Kirchhof =

Kirchhof may refer to:

- Hans Wilhelm Kirchhof (1525?-1602?), sometimes known as Kirchhoff, German Landsknecht, baroque poet and translator
- Paul Kirchhof (b. 1943), German jurist, tax law expert, former judge in the Federal Constitutional Court of Germany
- Ferdinand Kirchhof (b. 1950), German judge, jurisprudent, tax law expert
- Lutz Kirchhof (b. 1953), German lutenist
- Kirchhof, Melsungen, a district of the town Melsungen in Hesse, Germany

== See also ==
- Kirchhoff, surname
