= Association for Iron and Steel Technology =

Iron & steel professionals society

- Abbreviation: AIST
- Formation: 2004; United States
- Location: United States

The Association for Iron and Steel Technology (AIST) is a non-profit professional organization focused on promoting the international iron and steel industry through networking and education. The AIST has over 17,500 members in over 70 countries, though the majority of its members are from North America, reflecting its historical link to the American Steel industry. The AIST was formed from a merger from two older organizations, the Association of Iron and Steel Engineers and the Iron and Steel Society in 2004. AIST is a member organization of the American Institute of Mining, Metallurgical, and Petroleum Engineers (AIME). The head office of the organization is in Warrendale, Pennsylvania. From these offices is published the monthly Iron and Steel Technology magazine. The Association also runs an international conference each year called AISTech. AIST also offers training courses and local events organized by its various member chapters and technical committees.

== Technology Divisions ==
The AIST has a number of active Divisions reflecting the diversity of technological interests in the steel industry, these are:

- Safety and Environment
- Cokemaking and Ironmaking
- Steelmaking
- Refining and Casting
- Rolling and Processing
- Metallurgy
- Energy and Control
- Plant Services and Reliability
- Materials Movement and Transportation

These divisions are served by a number of committees that organize sessions at the AISTech conference and oversee training and education activities relating to these areas of knowledge. Two sub-committees exist, namely „Digitalization“ and „Decarbonization“, which act as interconnecting committees as they demand a liaison in each committee to coordinate efforts in their respective field of expertise.
