= Andrew Murray Hunt =

American engineer

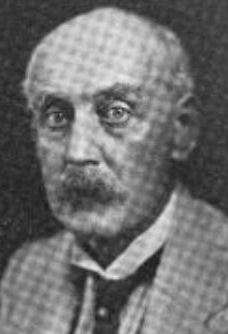
- Hunt in 1915
- Born: August 12, 1859; Sioux City, Iowa, U.S.
- Died: December 8, 1930; Berkeley, California, U.S.
- Military career
- Allegiance: United States
- Branch: United States Navy

Andrew Murray Hunt (August 12, 1859 – December 8, 1930) was an American electrical and mechanical engineer who served on the Naval Consulting Board during World War I and was president of the American Society of Civil Engineers in 1921 and 1922. His obituary in The New York Times describes him as "nationally eminent".

== Biography ==
Andrew Murray Hunt was born in Sioux City, Iowa, where his father, also Andrew Murray Hunt, was a physician; he had two brothers. He graduated from the United States Naval Academy in 1879.

Hunt founded the Mare Island Naval Shipyard's chemical laboratory, and became chief of the Department of Mechanical Arts in San Francisco in 1894 while still serving in the Navy. He then worked as a consulting engineer in that city, with projects including a power plant for Claus Spreckels. In 1915, he was appointed the head of the Peyton, Hunt Company, Inc. in New York.

In 1915, during World War I, he was appointed to the Naval Consulting Board as a representative of the American Society of Civil Engineers, where he worked in Washington, D.C. from 1917.

He served as president of the American Society of Civil Engineers in 1921 and 1922.

He died in Berkeley, California on December 8, 1930.
