= William Lawrence Saunders =

American mining engineer (1856–1931)

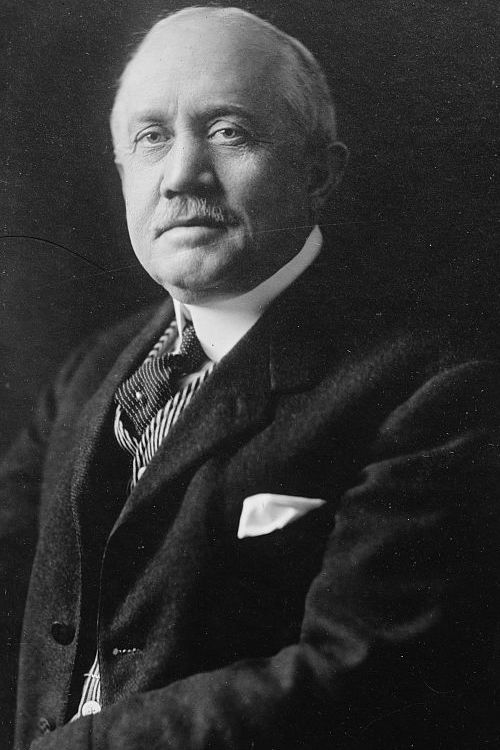
- Saunders in 1916
- Born: November 1, 1856; Columbus, Georgia
- Died: June 25, 1931 (aged 74); Tenerife, Canary Islands
- Known for: Chairman of the board of Ingersoll Rand
- Spouse: Bertha Louise Gaston
- Children: Louise Saunders Perkins; Jean Saunders Lancaster
- Parent(s): William Trebell Saunders; Eliza S. Morton

William Lawrence Saunders (November 1, 1856 – June 25, 1931) was a mining engineer who was chairman of the Naval Consulting Board during World War I. He was chairman of the board of Ingersoll Rand.

== Biography ==
He was born in 1856 to Reverend William Trebell Saunders and Eliza S. Morton in Columbus, Georgia. His family moved to Apalachicola, Florida, where his father became the pastor of the Trinity Protestant Episcopal Church.

He married Bertha Louise Gaston on August 3, 1886, in Kingston, Rhode Island. They had two daughters, Louise Saunders Perkins and Jean Saunders Lancaster.

On March 24, 1904, he was made president of the Ingersoll Sergeant Drill Company after the death of William Russell Grace. In May 1905, the Ingersoll-Sergeant Drill Company and the Rand Drill Company merged into Ingersoll Rand. He became the first president of the now combined Ingersoll Rand in 1906.

He resided in North Plainfield, New Jersey. He died on June 25, 1931, in Tenerife on the Canary Islands. He was buried in Hillside Cemetery in Scotch Plains, New Jersey.

Saunders was the first president of the New Jersey Men's League for Women's Suffrage.

He also served as the 1915 president of AIME (American Institute of Mining, Metallurgical and Petroleum Engineers). and deputy chairman of the Federal Reserve Bank of New York.
