= Autolycus (submarine detector) =

Detector for diesel fumes, used for submarine detection during the Cold War

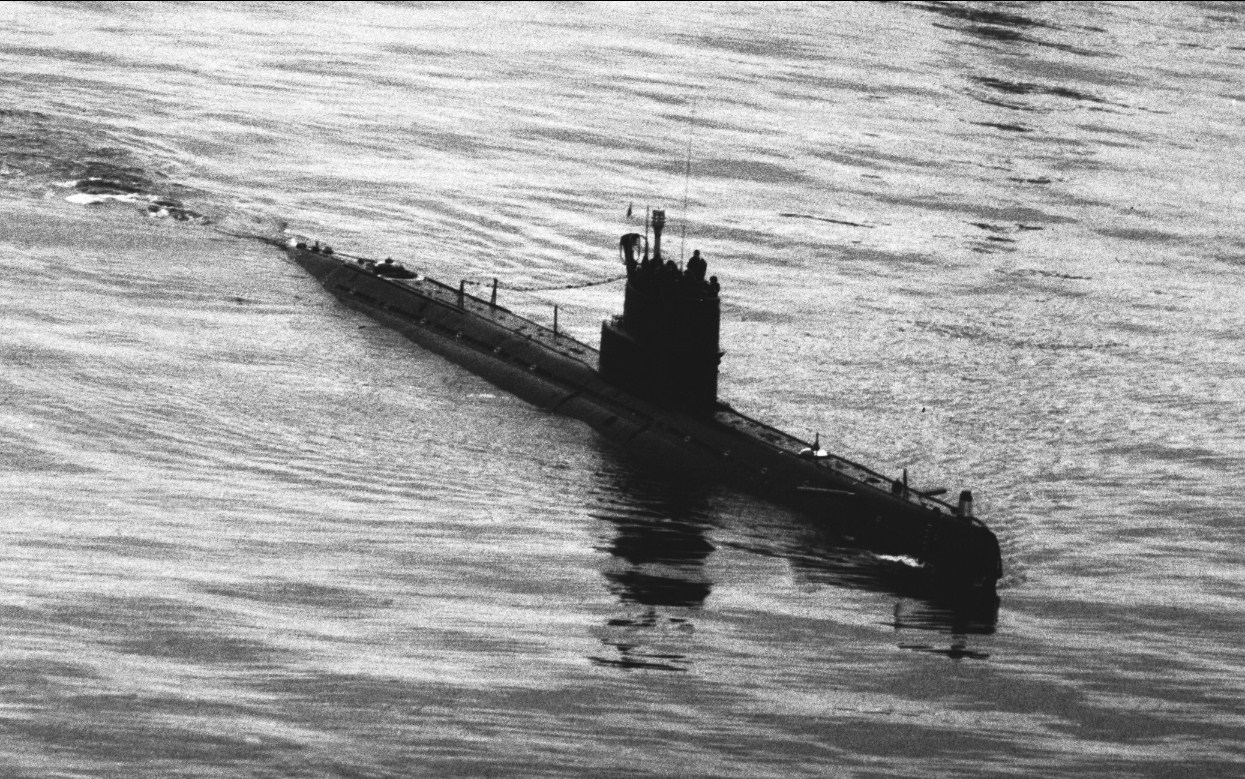
A Soviet Whiskey class diesel submarine

Autolycus or Sniffer was a submarine detection system designed to detect diesel-engined submarines from aircraft. It was designed to detect exhaust fumes from their diesel engines. Named after the mythical Greek, Autolycus, who took part in the search for the Golden Fleece, it was developed by the British during the early Cold War period. The first version of Autolycus was deployed on Avro Shackleton aircraft in the mid-1950s, with an improved version re-appearing in the mid-1960s.

== Submarines ==
Until the end of the Second World War, submarines spent the majority of the time on the surface, powered by their diesel engines. They could submerge for only short periods during and after the attack. This made them easy to detect on radar, and by 1943, radar-equipped aircraft had made surface submarine operations difficult.

Just before the outbreak of the Second World War, the Royal Netherlands Navy introduced the first submarine snorkels, which provided air to the crew and the engines, allowing the submarine to remain submerged just below the surface. This allowed them to avoid most radars, as well as allowing them to approach convoys more closely on diesel, extending the range they could run on batteries. When Nazi Germany invaded and occupied the Netherlands in 1940 they also captured the latest Dutch O 21-class submarines equipped with snorkels, which the Germans then copied and started to use from 1943 onwards. Designs like the Type XXI U-boat were the first German submarines to operate primarily submerged.

After the Second World War, this emphasis on submerged operation, battery capacity and higher submerged speed continued. In the US, the GUPPY program rebuilt wartime submarines to emphasise these features. In the Soviet Union, the four Type XXIs that were assigned to them by the Potsdam Agreement formed the basis for their Whiskey class.

In the 1950s, the Fleet Air Arm were flying in the North Sea and the GIUK gap for patrol and potentially anti-submarine warfare in search of Whiskey, Zulu and Foxtrot submarines. Patrol aircraft operated from RAF Ballykelly in Northern Ireland. A means was needed for the initial detection of submarines in the area. Once detected, other methods such as radar or sonobuoy hydrophones could be used to track and target the contact.

== Operation ==
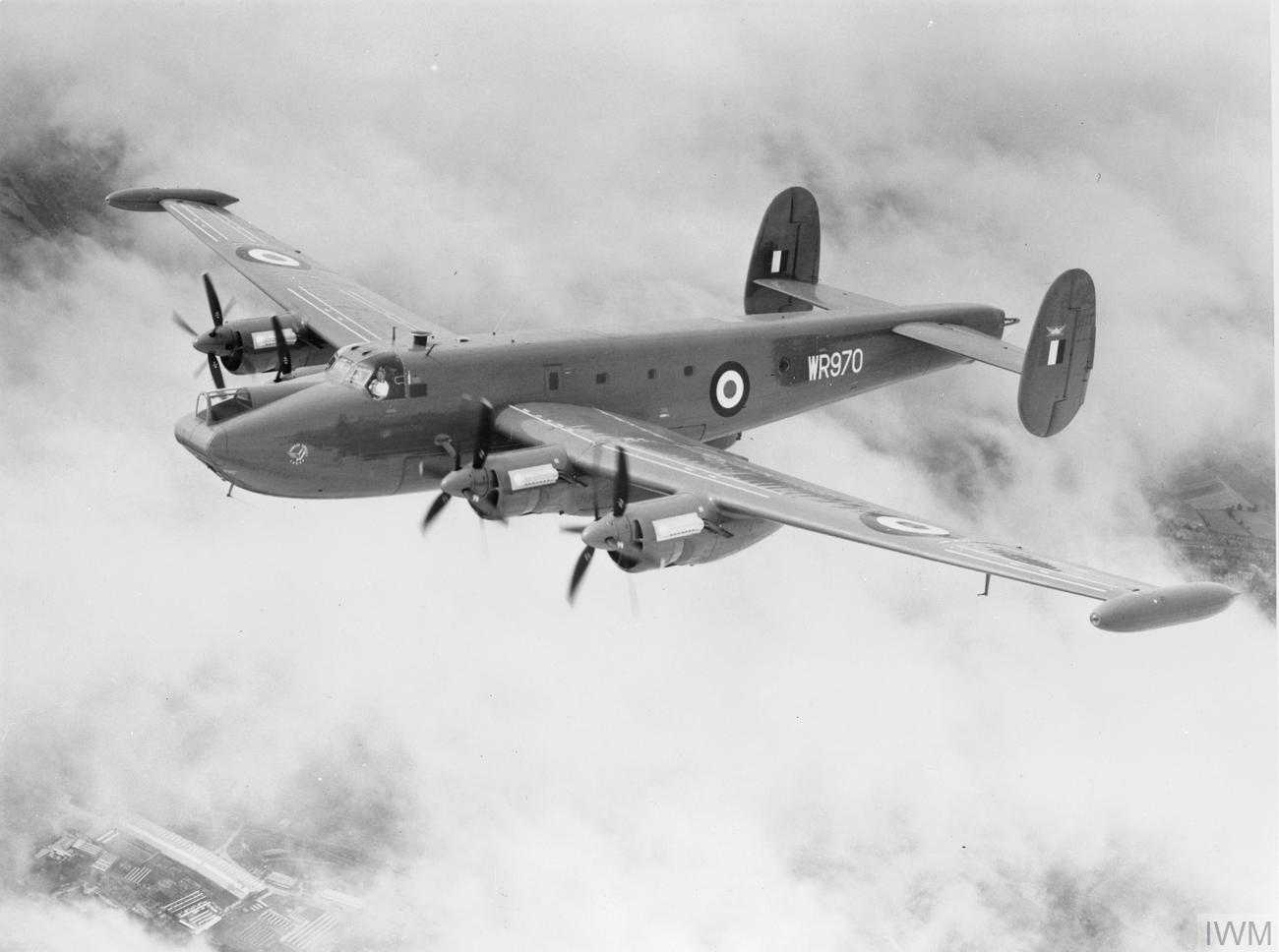
Shackleton MR.3

Autolycus was an ion-mobility spectrometer (IMS). This is an early technique of extreme sensitivity and was a major technique for the initial detection of an unseen submarine.

An IMS measures how fast a given ion moves in a uniform electric field through a given atmosphere. The spectrometer separates ions by shape and charge, so that different species arrive at the detector at different times. Typically this is used to produce a mobility profile characterising the sample. For Autolycus, a boxcar integrator sampled the times for known markers within diesel exhaust. Display to the operator was on a continuous paper printout.

The Autolycus technique was developed and first tested during the Second World War on warships. After the war, the Mk. II version became light enough for airborne use. Fast-moving aircraft were better able to locate submarines by travelling in search patterns.

Early Mk II versions of Autolycus suffered from calibration difficulties in high humidity and stopped working altogether in rain. These problems were reduced in the Mk. III version. This also had better time discrimination, giving better position fixes. On the Shackleton the air scoop for the system was located on the port side of the aircraft nose.

=== Search patterns ===
As Autolycus detected fumes from the submarine, rather than sound emanating from the hull, it could detect the passage of a submarine for some time after it had passed. This aided searching, as it did not need to pass directly overhead. A zig-zag search pattern was flown, passing at right-angles over the likely direction of submarine movements. When an exhaust plume was detected, the aircraft would begin to fly a tracking pattern of progressively shorter zig-zags. Each crossing of the plume trail would be plotted, giving a map plot of the submarine's likely track. As the track was narrowed down, the aircraft would switch sensors to a more precise method, such as centimetric radar or dropping sonobuoys before potentially closing for an attack.

== Withdrawal ==
Autolycus was withdrawn for a number of reasons. The most immediate one was the withdrawal of the Shackleton carrier aircraft and their replacement with the Nimrod MR1. Nimrod was fitted with Autolycus, but this legacy equipment was no longer considered to be a first-line technique and so it was not integrated into the new tactical display system, based on an Elliott 920 digital computer.

The Nimrod was equipped with a Magnetic Anomaly Detector (MAD) tail boom. MAD was considered to be more capable than the Autolycus approach and could also detect submerged submarines operating without diesels or the increasing threat from nuclear submarines. MAD had not been successfully fitted to the Shackleton, possibly because of interference problems from the piston engines and their ignition system.

Although the main submarine threat at the time of Autolycus' withdrawal was still the Soviet diesel-engine Golf and Juliett class submarines, increasing numbers of the nuclear-powered Hotel and Echo II were in service in this region. As these did not need to snorkel and did not produce diesel exhaust they were effectively undetectable by either the Shackleton's Autolycus or its ASV Mk 13 radar.

One of the cited limitations for Autolycus was a lack of discrimination between submarine exhaust, trawlers and on-shore sources. In practice this does not appear to have been a major limitation as it was used for initial detection, not identification or tracking.
