= A.T. Mine G.S. Mark II =

A.T. Mine G.S Mark
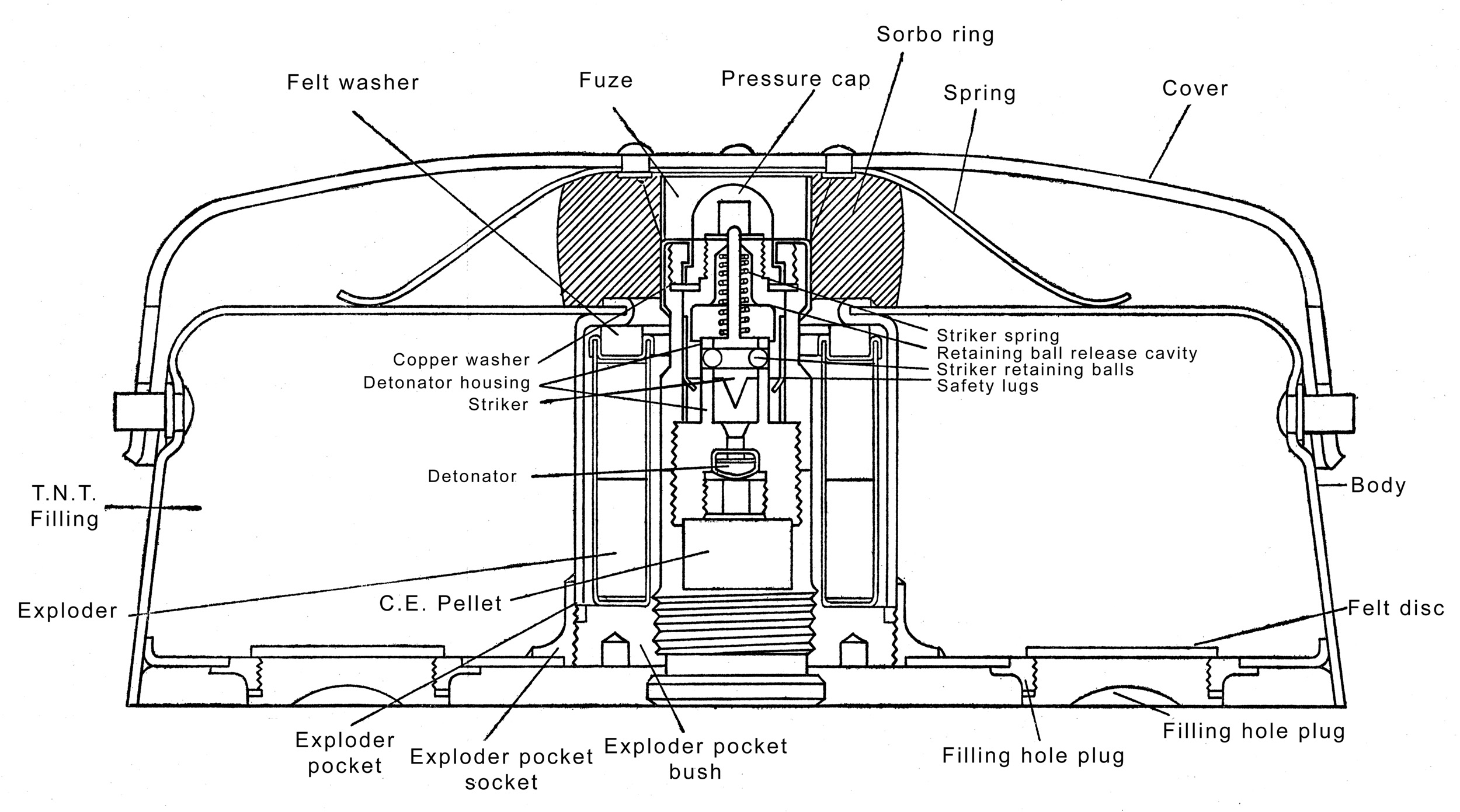
- A cutaway of a Mark II anti-tank mine with the Sorbo rubber ring installed.
- Type: Anti-tank Mine
- Place of origin: United Kingdom

Service history
- In service: 1937 -
- Used by: UK
- Wars: World War II

Production history
- Produced: -1942

Specifications
- Mass: 8 lb 8 oz (3.9 kg)
- Height: 3 1/4 inches (83 mm) with cover
- Diameter: 7 1/2 in (190 mm)
- Filling: TNT or Baratol
- Filling weight: 4 pounds (1.8 kg)

The Anti-Tank Mine General Service Mark II was a British anti-tank blast mine used during the Second World War.

== Design ==
It consisted of a body about 7.5 in (190 mm) in diameter and 3.25 in (83 mm). The mine has a central fuze well accessed from the bottom, with a main charge in a cavity around the well consisting of about 4 lb (1.8 kg) of TNT. The mine is fitted with a thin brass cover, which acts as a pressure plate. The cover is suspended over the main body of the main by four leaf springs. A Sorbo ring (Sorbo rubber sponge) can be fitted between the cover and the mine body, which absorbs shock and blast and allows the mines to be planted as close as two feet (0.61 m) without causing sympathetic detonation (normally five feet is the minimum safe distance).

Sufficient pressure - 350 lbf (1.6 kN) - on the cover of the mine causes the cover to press downward onto the pressure cap of the fuze. This downward pressure forces the assembly surrounding the striker down until the striker retaining balls are aligned with a cavity. The balls are pushed aside and the striker is released impacting the detonator which detonates the C.E. pellet, triggering the exploder and then the main charge.

The mine was effective against vehicles and capable of taking off the track of tanks up to medium tank size. The mines main charge was relatively small and the mine appears to have been withdrawn by the end of the war, being replaced by the larger Mk 5 mine. The mine was used in large numbers at the 1942 Second Battle of El Alamein.

Specifications

- Year of Introduction: 1937
- Diameter: 7 1/2 inches (19 cm)
- Height: 3 1/4 inches (8.3 cm) with cover
- Weight: 8.5 lb (3.9 kg)
- Operating force: 350 lbf (1.6 kN)
- Explosive content: 4 lb of TNT (1.8 kg) or Baratol
