= Bruce K. Kirchoff =

American botanist

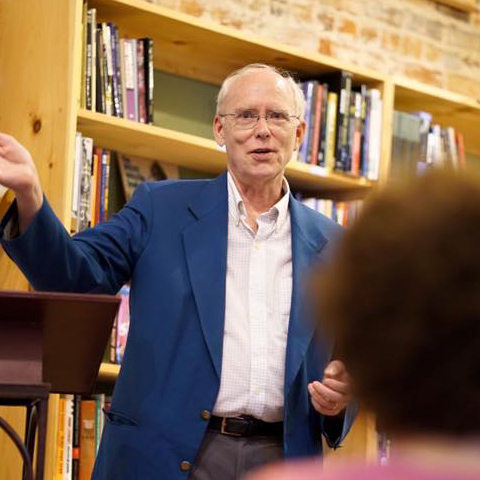
- Kirchoff in 2016
- Born: 1952 (age 73–74); Detroit, Michigan, U.S.
- Known for: Research on the Zingiberales; Visual learning software Image Quiz
- Awards: UNC Board of Governors Award for Excellence in Teaching (2014); Charles Edwin Bessey Teaching Award – Botanical Society of America (2014); Innovations in Plant Systematics Education Prize – American Society of Plant Taxonomists (2013)

Academic background
- Education: University of Michigan (B.G.S., M.S.); Duke University (Ph.D.)
- Thesis: Floral development and evolution in the Marantaceae and Cannaceae (1981)

Academic work
- Discipline: Botany
- Sub-discipline: Plant development; Evolution of plants; Science communication
- Institutions: Louisiana State University; Hebrew University of Jerusalem; Fairchild Tropical Botanic Garden; University of North Carolina at Greensboro

Bruce K. Kirchoff (born 1952) is an American botanist and educator. He is Professor Emeritus of Biology at the University of North Carolina at Greensboro, where he served from 1986 to 2022.

== Early life and education ==
Kirchoff was born in 1952 in Detroit, Michigan. He earned a Bachelor of General Studies with distinction from the University of Michigan in 1975, followed by a Master of Science in Biology in 1977 from the same institution. He completed his Ph.D. in Botany at Duke University in 1981, with a dissertation on the floral development and evolution in the Marantaceae and Cannaceae plant families.

== Career ==
After receiving his Ph.D., Kirchoff joined Louisiana State University, where he served as a Visiting Assistant Professor of botany in 1981–1982 and later undertook postdoctoral research at the Hebrew University of Jerusalem from 1982 to 1984. Subsequently, he worked as a Research Associate at the Fairchild Tropical Garden from 1984 to 1986, where he continued studying tropical plant development.

Kirchoff joined the faculty at the University of North Carolina at Greensboro in 1986, where he served as a faculty member in the Department of Biology until his retirement.

In 2013, Kirchoff founded the company Metis LLC to expand the reach of his visual learning software beyond UNCG. The software has been used by students at institutions such as Charles Sturt University in Australia, North Carolina State University and others. His software is now distributed by the Apereo Foundation through its Image Quiz Project.

He served as chair of the Botanical Society of America’s Education Committee in 1993–94 and as chair of the Developmental and Structural Section from 2011-2013.

From 1999 to 2007, Kirchoff served as Associate Editor of the Journal of the Torrey Botanical Society and from 2015 to 2019 as an editor of the International Journal of Plant Sciences.

From 2016 to 2022, he was a Faculty Fellow in the UNCG University Speaking Center.

In 2021, his book, Presenting Science Concisely, was published. The book was favorably reviewed in the Communication Center Journal and by the European Association of Science Editors.

While at UNCG he also served as a Visiting Scholar in the Department of Integrative Biology at the University of California, Berkeley, as a Visiting Scientist at the South China Botanical Garden, and as a Visiting Research Scientist at the Royal Botanic Gardens in Sydney.

Kirchoff retired from UNCG and was awarded the position of Professor Emeritus in 2022.

In 2023, Kirchoff was honored as an Associate of the Taos Institute for his work on the social construction of knowledge.

== Research ==
Kirchoff's research focused on plant evolution from structural and developmental perspectives, particularly in the plant order Zingiberales, which includes gingers and bananas. He has also studied methods to improve the use of morphological characters in evolutionary analysis and has developed visual learning software for organism identification.

Kirchoff continues to make contributions through his work with scientific communication and teaching improv to cancer survivors.

== Selected publications ==
- Kirchoff, Bruce K. (1992). "Ovary structure and anatomy in the Heliconiaceae and Musaceae (Zingiberales)". Canadian Journal of Botany. 70 (12): 2490–2508. Bibcode:1992CaJB...70.2490K. doi:10.1139/b92-308.
- Kirchoff, Bruce K.; Remington, David L.; Richter, Sara J. (2007). "Characters as Groups: A New Approach to Morphological Characters in Phylogenetic Analysis". Taxon. 56 (2): 479–492. Bibcode:2007Taxon..56..479K. doi:10.1002/tax.562018.
- Kirchoff, Bruce K.; Delaney, Peter F.; Horton, Meg; Dellinger-Johnston, Rebecca (2014). "Optimizing Learning of Scientific Category Knowledge in the Classroom: The Case of Plant Identification". CBE: Life Sciences Education. 13 (3): 425–436. doi:10.1187/cbe.13-11-0224. PMC 4152204. PMID 25185226.
- Kirchoff, B. K. (2017). "Inflorescence and flower development in Musa velutina H. Wendl. & Drude (Musaceae), with a consideration of developmental variability, restricted phyllotactic direction, and hand initiation". International Journal of Plant Sciences. 178 (4): 259–272. doi:10.1086/691143.

== Awards and recognition ==
- UNC Board of Governors Award for Excellence in Teaching (2014)
- Charles Edwin Bessey Teaching Award from the Botanical Society of America (2014)
- Innovations in Plant Systematics Education Prize from the American Society of Plant Taxonomists (2013)
