= Benjamin Bowditch Thayer =

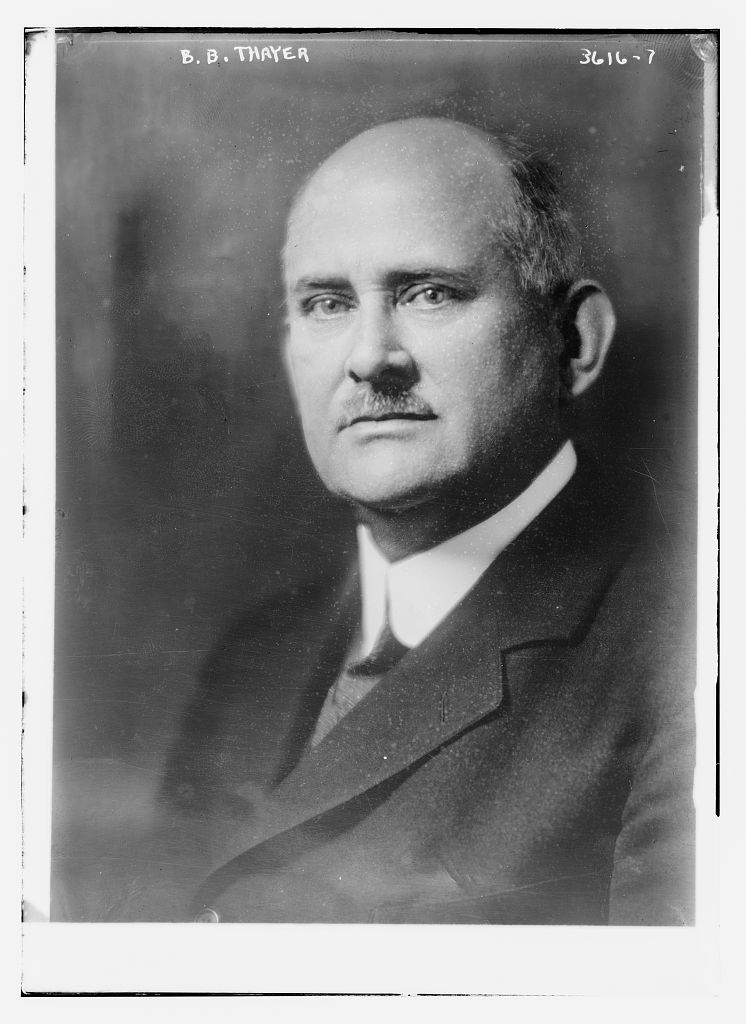
Benjamin Bowditch Thayer circa 1915

Benjamin Bowditch Thayer (October 20, 1862 – February 22, 1933) was a vice president of Anaconda Copper and served on the Naval Consulting Board. He was president of the New York Society of Harvard Engineers.

== Biography ==
He was born on October 20, 1862, in San Francisco, California. He attended the public schools in Quincy, Massachusetts then the Harvard School of Engineering and Applied Sciences at Harvard University. He married Marie Renouard.

He served on the Naval Consulting Board in 1915. He died on February 22, 1933, at New York Hospital following an operation. His widow died in 1950.
