= Charles William Henry Kirchhoff =

American editor and steel expert

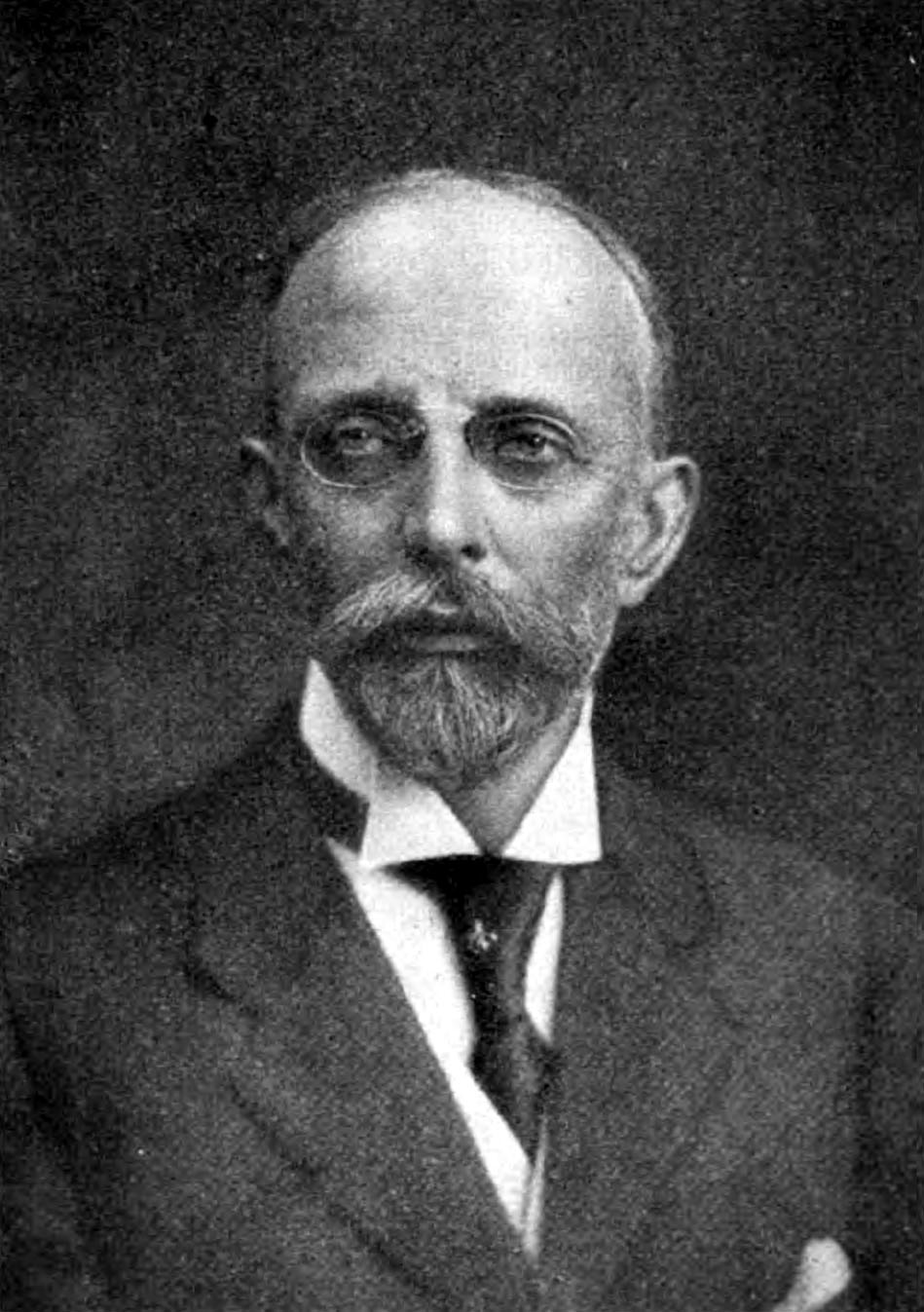
- Born: March 28, 1853; San Francisco, California
- Died: July 22, 1916 (aged 63); Asbury Park, New Jersey
- Education: Royal School of Mines at Clausthal
- Occupation(s): Editor, metallurgist
- Spouse: Erwina Diepenbrock (m. 1912)

Charles William Henry Kirchhoff (March 28, 1853 – July 22, 1916) was a United States editor and steel expert.

== Biography ==
Charles William Henry Kirchhoff was born in San Francisco, California, on March 28, 1853. He attended school in the United States and Germany and was graduated from the Royal School of Mines at Clausthal, Germany, in 1874, taking the degree of mining engineer and metallurgist. During the next three years, he was chemist, assayer and assistant superintendent of the Delaware Lead Mills at Philadelphia.

He began his career in technical journalism in 1876, when he covered the Centennial Exposition for British, German and Cape Town, South Africa, papers. He then joined the Metallurgical Review in 1877. He left that short-lived journal in 1878 to join the staff of the Iron Age. He left Iron Age in 1881 to be managing editor of the Engineering and Mining Journal, but returned to Iron Age in 1884. Four years later he became its editor-in-chief and vice-president of the David Williams Company, the publishers. Kirchhoff kept up his editorial work, in which he won distinction, until his resignation in 1909, although he had been asked by Andrew Carnegie to quit New York for Pittsburgh and the Carnegie Steel Company.

From 1898–99 and 1911–12, he was president of the American Institute of Mining Engineering. He was at one time a special agent of the United States Geological Survey for the collection of statistics of the production of copper, lead and zinc. Beginning in 1882, he prepared chapters on certain of the heavier metals annually for the Mineral Resources of the United States. He was a member of the Iron and Steel Institute, was once president of the Germania Club and was a member of the American Society of Mechanical Engineers.

In 1912 he married Erwina Diepenbrock.

He died at his summer home near Asbury Park, New Jersey, on July 22, 1916.
