= Tebbs =

Tebbs is a name. Notable people with this name include:

- Barry Tebb
- Betty Tebbs (1918–2017), English activist
- Francis Tebbs Havergal (1829–1890)
- James Tebbs (1878–1901), English football player
- Reginald Tebbs (1908–1973), English cricket player
- Tebbs Lloyd Johnson (1900–1984), British speed-walker
- William H. Tebbs (1821–1866), American politician
- Sophie Tebbs (1998-Present), Aspiring structural engineer
