= Frank Hereford =

Frank Hereford may refer to:

- Frank Hereford (politician), U.S. representative and senator from West Virginia
- Frank Hereford (university president), president of the University of Virginia
- Frank H. Hereford, attorney and member of the Arizona constitutional convention
