= Levi Manning =

American politician (1864–1935)

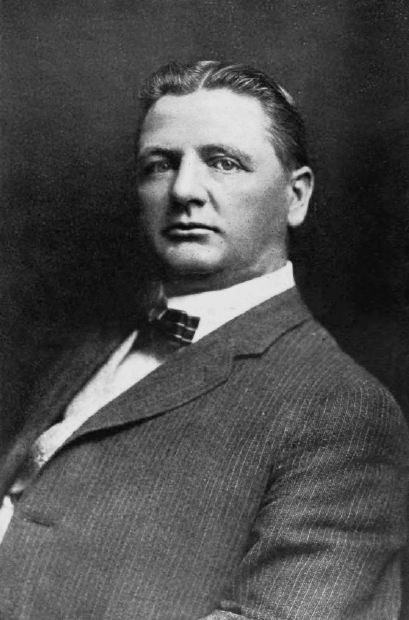
- Manning, c. 1913

Mayor of Tucson, Arizona
- In office 1905–1907
- Preceded by: Charles J. Schumacher
- Succeeded by: Charles F. Slack

Personal details
- Born: May 16, 1864 Halifax County, North Carolina, C.S.
- Died: August 6, 1935 (aged 71) Beverly Hills, California, U.S.
- Resting place: Evergreen Cemetery; Tucson, Arizona, U.S. 32.2654°N 110.9788°W
- Spouse: Gussie Lovell O'Connell (m. 1898)
- Parent: Van H. Manning (father)
- Relatives: Van H. Manning (brother)
- Education: University of Mississippi

Levi Howell Manning (May 18, 1864 – August 1, 1935) served as Mayor of Tucson, Arizona from 1905 to 1907.

== Early life ==
Levi H. Manning was born second in a family of four brothers and four sisters in Halifax County, North Carolina to Vannoy Hartrog Manning, a U.S. Representative from Mississippi and an officer in the Confederate Army of Northern Virginia during the American Civil War.

In 1883, during summer break while attending the University of Mississippi, Manning and a fraternity brother acquired the use of a circus elephant. The elephant escaped from Manning and rampaged through town. Upon hearing the story, Manning's mother advised him to get out of town before his father found out. Consequently he moved to Tucson, Arizona, in early spring 1884.

== Career ==
Upon arrival in Tucson, Manning worked as a reporter for The Daily Arizona Citizen and later The Arizona Daily Star. He later bought a controlling interest in and was general manager of the Tucson Ice & Electric Light Company for two years, making a “considerable fortune” when he sold it. He was chief of the Mineral Department in the office of U.S. Surveyor during the latter half of Grover Cleveland's first administration. In 1893 President Cleveland appointed Manning as Surveyor-General of Arizona, which he held until 1897.

Manning developed several mines in Sonora, Mexico, and founded the Owl Club of Tucson and developed real estate in Tucson. In 1900 Manning became president and general manager of a general mercantile firm in Tucson, renamed the L. H. Manning Co. with the acquisition of Norton & Drake. In 1904 Manning, Charles M. Shannon, and Epes Randolph opened the Santa Rita Hotel in Tucson. He also developed agricultural districts in the Santa Cruz valley.

In 1904 Manning homesteaded 160 acres in the Rincon Mountains to the east of Tucson, building a cabin that still exists today. The same year, along with Frank H. Hereford and W.H. Barnes, he helped establish the first Tucson Country Club, which was located on present-day Speedway Blvd and Campbell Ave. His mansion in Tucson was designed by Henry C. Trost.

=== Mayor of Tucson ===
Manning was elected mayor on an anti-gambling ticket. Though gambling was legal in territorial Arizona, Manning and the city council enacted local ordinances that put the Tucson gambling houses out of business.

In 1906 Manning was instrumental in bringing an electric trolley system to Tucson that replaced horse and mule drawn vehicles.

== Personal life ==
On May 28, 1898, Manning married Gussie Lovell O'Connell, who had been born in San Jose, California. He died August 1, 1935, in Beverly Hills, California, and is buried Evergreen Cemetery in Tucson.

Manning was described as "far-seeing," "a man of vast schemes," and "ranked with the most important builders Southwest."

The Manning House, and the street Manning House Way are in downtown Tucson.
