= 3rd Arkansas Infantry Regiment (Confederate) =

Infantry regiment of the Confederate States Army

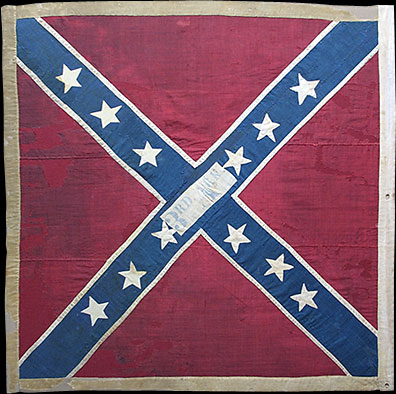
- Regimental color of the Third Arkansas at the Old State House Museum in Little Rock, Arkansas
- Active: 1861–1865
- Disbanded: April 12, 1865
- Country: Confederate States
- Allegiance: Arkansas
- Branch: Army
- Type: Regiment
- Role: Infantry
- Part of: Texas Brigade
- Nickname: "Third Arkansas"
- Facings: Light blue
- Engagements: American Civil War; Battle of Cheat Mountain; Battle of Hancock; Battle of Seven Pines; Seven Days Battles; Battle of Harpers Ferry; Battle of Antietam; Battle of Fredericksburg; Battle of Gettysburg; Battle of the Wilderness; Battle of Chickamauga; Knoxville Campaign; Battle of Spotsylvania; Battle of Cold Harbor; Siege of Petersburg; Appomattox Campaign

Commanders
- Commanding officers: Col. Albert Rust; Col. Van. H. Manning; Lieut. Col. Robert S. Taylor (acting)

The 3rd Arkansas Infantry Regiment, also known as the "Third Arkansas", was a line infantry formation of the Confederate States Army in the Eastern Theater of the American Civil War.

Mustered into Confederate service in 1861 under Colonel Albert Rust, and later falling under the command of Colonel Van. H. Manning, the Arkansas regiment was part of the Army of Northern Virginia, serving under General Robert E. Lee. The Third Arkansas served for the duration of the war, from the late months of 1861, through to its surrender at Appomattox Court House in 1865.

It was the only Arkansas regiment to serve the entire war in the Eastern Theater, where most of the major American Civil War battles were fought, and the only one from the state to initially sign up for the duration of the war, with all other regiments from the state opting for twelve-month enlistments.

== Formation ==
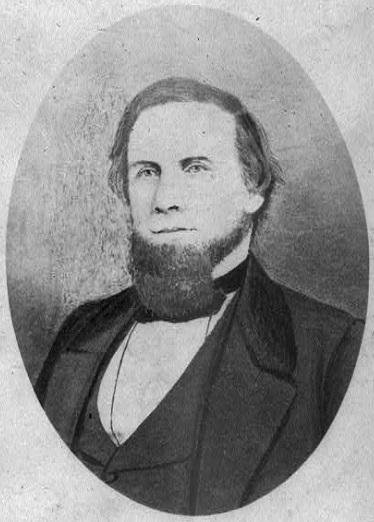
Albert Rust

The regiment was formed in May and June 1861, initially by Dr. W. H. Tebbs, who would be appointed a captain, and Van. H. Manning who would later command the regiment. Early in May, 1861, Dr. W. H. Tebbs, captain of a volunteer company raised on Bayou Bartholomew, in Ashley county, and Captain Van. H. Manning, the captain of a company organized at Hamburg, in Ashley County, went to Vicksburg, Mississippi, in order to tender the services of their two companies, for service in the Confederate Army. They contacted Leroy P. Walker, Confederate Secretary of War, at Montgomery, by telegraph and received his reply declining the offer of the two companies, separate from a regiment. They then went to Montgomery, and Manning enlisted the help of Arkansas Confederate Senator Albert Rust. Rust help gain the acceptance as a part of the Confederate Army, conditioned on his raising the remaining companies needed to form a regiment. Rust, returned to Arkansas, and organized nine additional companies, and joined Captain Tebbs and Capt Manning in Virginia, where the regiment was mustered into service for the period of the war. The addition of nine companies made eleven when the regiment was organized. Tebbs' Company and Captain Mannings' were perhaps the first and only companies denied admission into the Confederate service, even for a day, and were the first companies enlisted for the war. When organized, the regiment was composed of 11 companies:

- Company A — "The Arkansas Travelers", commanded by Captain W. H. Tebbs, organized at Portland, Ashley county. On September 25, 1862, forty-two members of disbanded Company L—also from Ashley county—were assigned to this company. During its four years of service, 147 men served in Company A. Only twenty of them remained when the company was surrendered at Appomattox Court House.
- Company B — "The Berlin Beauregards", commanded by Captain Capers, organized at Berlin, Ashley county. During its four years of service, 110 men served in Company B, only eight of them remained when the company was surrendered at Appomattox Court House.
- Company C — "The Confederate Stars", commanded by Captain Thomas M. Whittington, organized at Monticello, Drew county. During its four years of service, 154 men served in Company C, only thirteen of them remained when the company was surrendered at Appomattox Court House.
- Company D — "The Selma Rifles", commanded by Captain R. S. Taylor, organized at Selma, Drew county. During its four years of service, 83 men served in Company D, only eight of them remained when the company was surrendered at Appomattox Court House.
- Company E — "The Champagnolle Guards", commanded by Captain Thomas F. Nolan, organized at Champagnolle, Union county. On July 18, 1862, twenty-eight members of disbanded Company C, Second Arkansas Infantry Battalion, which was also from Union county, were assigned to this company. During its four years of service, 131 men served in Company E, only twenty of them remained when the company was surrendered at Appomattox Court House.
- Company F — "The Hot Spring Hornets", commanded by Captain Daniel A. Newman, organized at Rockport, Hot Spring county. On July 18, 1862, thirty-three members of disbanded Company A, 2nd Arkansas Infantry Battalion, were assigned to this company; however, most of them were soon discharged for various wounds and illnesses. During its four years of service, 119 men served in Company F, only ten of them remained when the company was surrendered at Appomattox Court House.
- Company G — "The Three Creeks Rifles", commanded by Captain, later Major Reedy, organized at Three Creeks, Union county. On July 18, 1862, eighteen members of disbanded Company C, 2nd Arkansas Infantry Battalion—also from Union county—were assigned to this company. During its four years of service, 127 men served in Company G, only 23 of them remained when the company was surrendered at Appomattox Court House.
- Company H — "The Orphan Company", commanded by Captain Reed, a mixed Arkansas/Kentucky company. The fledgling company had only gathered 33 volunteers, only a third of that needed to constitute a full company. Two companies of Arkansas volunteers from Ashley county, passing through Nashville, Tennessee, on their way to Virginia to form the Third Arkansas Infantry, met Samuel V. Reid, of Kentucky, who had brought 30 of his fellow Kentuckians down to Tennessee, looking for a regiment to attach themselves to. It was proposed that the two groups of volunteers join forces to fit out a full company for the Third Arkansas. The commissioned and non-commissioned officer appointments would be equally divided among the two groups, with Reid becoming captain and Gibson becoming first lieutenant. Accordingly, the Kentuckians enlisted at Nashville on June 10; the Arkansawyers enlisted at Tyro on June 15; and the new company traveled to Lynchburg, Virginia, where it was assigned to the Third Regiment, Arkansas Volunteers, as Company H, July 1861. Colonel Albert Rust, regimental commander, referred to the company as "my orphans", a name which the men adopted as "The Orphan Company". In keeping with its cosmopolitan nature, Company H also recruited quite a few Virginians during the war. During its four years of service, 116 men served in Company H, only nine of them remained when the company was surrendered at Appomattox Court House.
- Company I — "The Tulip Rifles", commanded by Captain Alexander, organized at Tulip, Dallas county. On July 18, 1862, thirty members of disbanded Company B, Second Arkansas Infantry Battalion, were assigned to this company. Company I was the only company in the Third Arkansas that made significant use of conscripts to reinforce its ranks. In March 1863, thirty farmers and furloughed soldiers from other regiments were conscripted at Camden, Arkansas, and sent to the company in Virginia. During its four years of service, 150 men served in Company I. Only thirteen of them remained when the company was surrendered at Appomattox Court House.
- Company K — "The Ashley Volunteers", commanded by Captain Wilson Wilkins organized at Hamburg, Ashley county. During its four years of service, 134 men served in Company A, only twenty-four of them remained when the company was surrendered at Appomattox Court House.
- Company L — "The Rust Guards", commanded by Captain Joseph H. Bell organized at Latonia, Ashley county (later consolidated with Company A). On September 25, 1862, the company was disbanded. Forty-two of its members were transferred to company A—also from Ashley county. A total of seventy-three men were carried on the rolls of Company L during its existence. Only ten of them remained when the regiment was surrendered at Appomattox Court House.

Albert Rust was appointed colonel, and the regiment was sent to Lynchburg, Virginia, for military training. While in Virginia, command level officers with formal military training were assigned to the regiment, to include West Point graduate Seth. M. Barton who was assigned as lieutenant-colonel, and with Virginia Military Institute graduate Thomas Middleton Semmes assigned as regimental adjutant. The regiment was then attached to General Lee's Army of Northern Virginia, and deployed to the area of what would soon after become West Virginia. By mid-1862, the regiment was under the command of Van. Manning following Albert Rust's promotion to brigadier-general, with William H. Tebbs being promoted to lieutenant-colonel.

== Battle actions ==
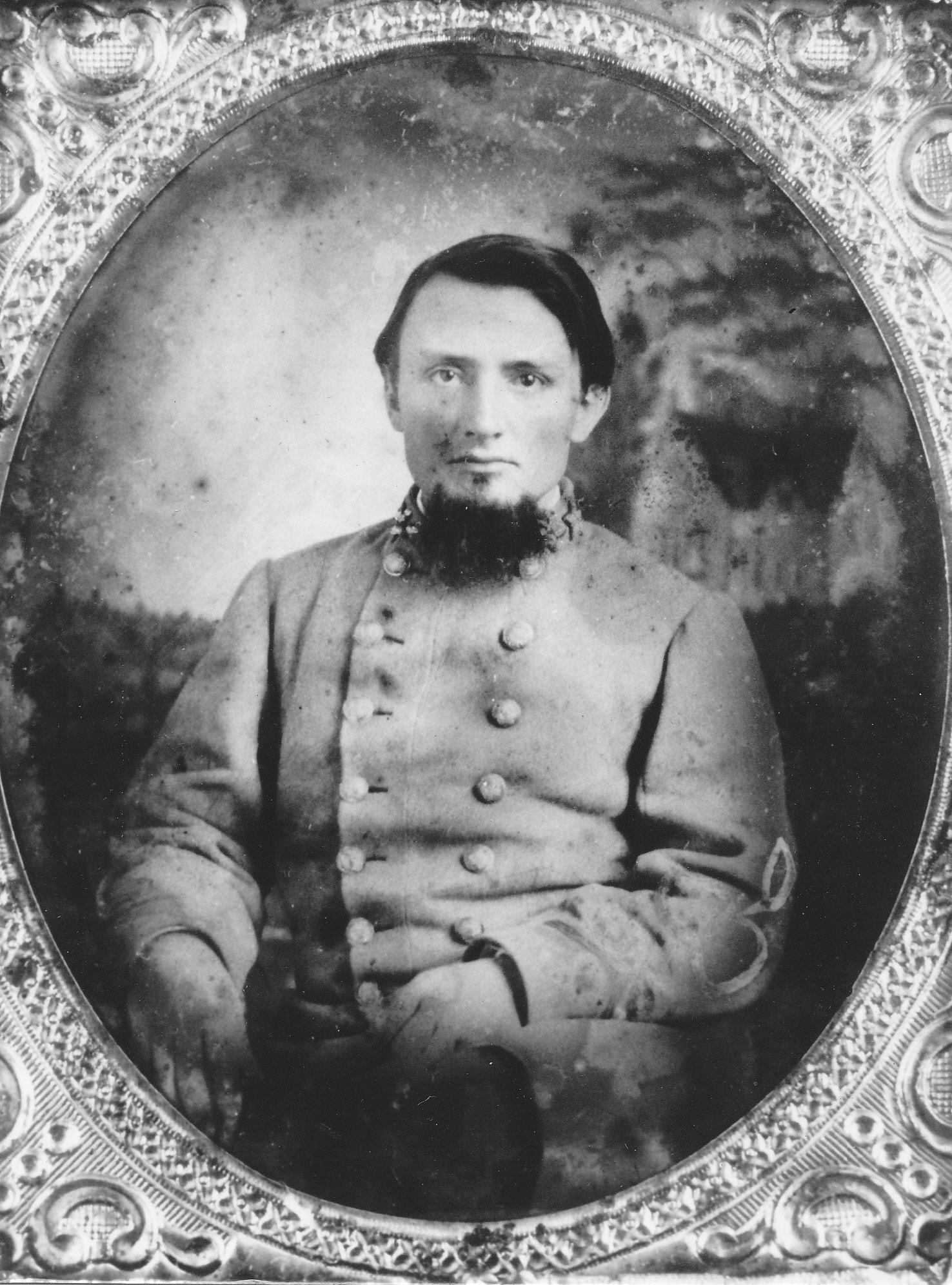
Van. H. Manning in 1861

From its induction into the Confederate Army, the Third Arkansas would go on to become one of the most distinguished and well respected Confederate regiments of the war. However, prior to their first battle actions, the first impressions of them by their fellow Confederates were, by written accounts since, not good. In several accounts, relayed by author and historian Mauriel P. Joslyn, the regiment was first seen as a poorly dressed and poorly equipped lot of ignorant country boys. Once proven in combat, however, those opinions of them would change dramatically.

The regiment was ordered to the mountains of West Virginia, where it performed arduous and discouraging service in the campaign on the Gauley and Cheat rivers. The regiment was engaged in the Battle of Cheat Mountain and the Battle of Greenbrier River. This was followed by hard marching under Stonewall Jackson (whom Col Rust later described as "an impracticable old schoolmaster who said grace before he ate and prayed before going to bed") in the Valley Campaign. Under General Jackson at Winchester, in January, 1862, the Third Arkansas marched to Bath and Romney, returned to Winchester, and was ordered thence to Fredericksburg and assigned to the brigade of Gen. Theophilus H. Holmes. Colonel Rust was promoted to brigadier-general about this time, and was transferred to a command in the western armies. Van. Manning was promoted to the colonel of the regiment succeeding Rust.

The Third Arkansas was engaged in the battles of White Oak Swamp, June 3, 1862, in J.G. Walker's brigade, on July 1, 1862, participated in the battle of Malvern Hill.

In July, 1862, the ranks of the Third Arkansas was augmented by the addition of nearly 140 soldiers from the 2nd Arkansas Infantry Battalion. The Second Arkansas Battalion had been organized in October, 1861, from three companies of volunteers from El Dorado, Hot Springs and Pine Bluff. In June, 1862, the 2nd Arkansas Battalion was decimated while leading an assault on the Federal position at Beaver Dam Creek, and its commander, Major William Naylor Bronaugh, mortally wounded. The War Department disbanded the battalion and transferred its survivors to the Third Arkansas.

On September 17, 1862, at the Battle of Antietam, Companies A and L of the Third Arkansas were decimated. On September 25 the few survivors of Company L were transferred into Company A and Company L ceased to exist. Thus the regiment was reduced to ten companies, the normal complement for an infantry regiment. Col. Manning was seriously wounded during the battle.

In November, 1862, the Third Arkansas was assigned to the famous Texas Brigade of the Army of Northern Virginia. The Confederate War Department had determined that the troops would benefit from being brigaded with regiments from their home States. At this time, the standard brigade organization consisted of four regiments. There were three Texas regiments in the Army—the 1st, 4th and 5th—and only one Arkansas regiment. It was therefore decided to group these four western regiments together. The Third Arkansas remained an integral part of Hood's Texas Brigade until the end of the war. The first engagement that the unit participated in as part of the Texas Brigade was the Battle of Fredericksburg in December, 1862. The regiment was not engaged at Chancellorsville, being detached with the rest of Longstreet's Corps at Suffolk.

The Third Arkansas acquired a reputation as tenacious fighters, often finding themselves in the thickest fighting on the battlefield, such as their presence at the "sunken road" during the Battle of Antietam. Their most famous action was while serving as a part of the Texas Brigade during the Battle of Gettysburg, at the Devil's Den, where they took heavy casualties while serving under General John Bell Hood. Its place in the front of Hood's assault meant it was one of the first units, if not the first, to be heavily engaged during the second day of the battle. The regiment was commended for gallantry in that action, while under the direct command of Brigadier General Jerome B. Robertson, fighting in and in the vicinity of the "Devil's Den".

The regiment was transferred with Longstreet's Corps to Tennessee in September, 1863 in time to fight at the Battle of Chickamauga (where Major Reedy was mortally wounded). The unit went on to participate in the battles of Chattanooga, Wauhatchie, and in the siege of Knoxville, Tennessee, returning to the Army of Northern Virginia in the spring of 1864.

The regiment suffered heavy casualties later in the Battle of the Wilderness, during which they lost many of their commanding officers in addition to heavy losses in their ranks. In that battle they lost Colonel Van. H. Manning and Lieutenant-colonel Robert S. Taylor, both of whom were badly wounded and captured, in addition to Major William K. Wilkins who was killed in action.

The regiment continue the fight at Spotsylvania, and on to Cold Harbor. The regiment was at Deep Run on August 6, 1864; at Petersburg during the siege by Grant, at High Bridge and Farmville during the closing day of the war in 1865.

By the end of the war, the Texas Brigade as a whole, which included the 1st, 4th, and 5th Texas, and the Third Arkansas, had only 617 men remaining out of a total of 5,353. The 3rd Arkansas Infantry Regiment is entitled to the following campaign participation credit:

- Operations on Cheat Mountain, West Virginia, September 11–17, 1861.
- Skirmish, Elkwater, West Virginia, September 11, 1861.
- Skirmish, Point Mountain Turnpike, West Virginia, September 11–12, 1861.
- Skirmish, Petersburg, West Virginia, September 12, 1861.
- Engagement, Greenbrier River, Cheat Mountain, West Virginia, October 3–4, 1861.
- Operations in the Valley District and against Romney, West Virginia, November 26, 1861, to February 21, 1862.
- Battle of Seven Pines (Fair Oaks), Virginia, May 31 to June 1, 1862.
- Skirmish, Gill's Bluff, Virginia (Company F), June 20, 1862.
- Seven Days Battles, Virginia, June 25 to July 1, 1862.
- Engagement, Turkey Bridge (Malvern Cliff), Virginia, June 30, 1862.
- Campaign in Northern Virginia (Second Bull Run Campaign), August 16 to September 2, 1862.
- Maryland Campaign, September 3–19, 1862.
- Siege, Harper's Ferry, West Virginia, September 13, 1862.
- Battle of Antietam (Sharpsburg), Maryland, September 16–17, 1862.
- Action, Bolivar Heights, West Virginia, September 19, 1862.
- Operations in Loudoun, Fauquier and Rappahannock Counties, Virginia, October 26 to November 10, 1862.
- Battle of Fredericksburg, Virginia, December 12–15, 1862.
- Siege, Suffolk, Virginia, April 11 to May 4, 1863.
- Skirmish, Somerton Road, Virginia, April 15, 1863.
- Skirmish, Somerton Road, Virginia, April 20, 1863.
- Action, Edenton Road, Suffolk, Virginia, April 24, 1863.
- Gettysburg Campaign, June 3 to August 1, 1863.
- Battle of Gettysburg, Pennsylvania, July 1–3, 1863.
- Battle of Chickamauga, Georgia, September 19–21, 1863.
- Siege, Chattanooga, Tennessee, September 24 to November 1, 1863.
- Campaign, Knoxville, Tennessee, November 4 to December 23, 1863.
- Siege, Knoxville, Tennessee, November 17 to December 4, 1863.
- Assault, Forts Saunders and Loudoun, Knoxville, Tennessee, November 29, 1863.
- Operations about Dandridge, Tennessee, January 16 to January 17, 1864.
- Operations about Dandridge, Tennessee, January 26–28, 1864.
- Wilderness Campaign, May 4 to June 12, 1864.
- Battle of the Wilderness, Virginia, May 5–7, 1864.
- Battles of Spotsylvania Court House, Laurel Hill, Ny River and Fredericksburg Road, Virginia, May 8–21, 1864.
- Assault of the Salient, Spotsylvania Court House, Virginia, May 12, 1864.
- Operations on the line of the North Anna River, Virginia, May 22–26, 1864.
- Operations on the line of the Pamunkey River, Virginia, May 26–28, 1864.
- Operations on the line of the Totopotomoy River, Virginia, May 28–31, 1864.
- Battles about Cold Harbor, Virginia, June 1–12, 1864.
- Assault, Petersburg, Virginia, June 15, 1864.
- Siege operations against Petersburg and Richmond, Virginia, June 16, 1864, to April 2, 1865.
- Assault, Petersburg, Virginia, June 18, 1864.
- Engagements at Deep Bottom (Darbytown), Strawberry Plains and New Market Road, Virginia, June 27–29, 1864.
- Engagements at Deep Bottom, New Market Road and Darbytown Road, Virginia, August 13–20, 1864.
- Engagement, Fair Oaks and Darbytown Road, Virginia, October 27–28, 1864.
- Appomattox Campaign, March 28 to April 9, 1865.
- Assault and capture, Petersburg Lines, Virginia, April 2, 1865.
- Surrender, Appomattox Court House, Virginia, April 9, 1865.

== Regimental colors ==
Regimental colors of
the Third Arkansas

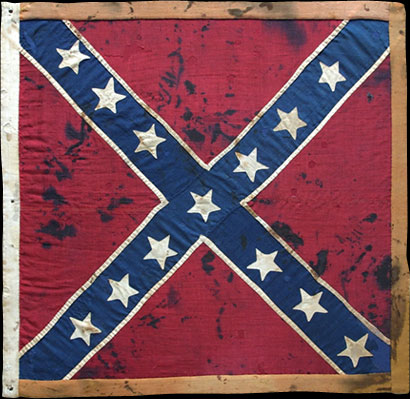
1862–1863

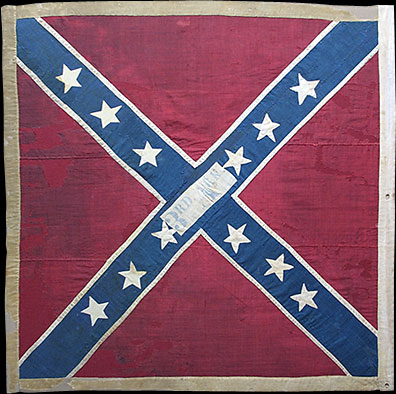
1863–1865

The 3rd Arkansas is generally understood to have had at least four different regimental colors during the war, and there are at least three surviving examples of the battle flags of the 3rd Arkansas Infantry Regiment:

The first flag of the Third Arkansas was probably a First National Confederate Flag issued to either company C, the Confederate Starts, or Company K, the Ashley Volunteers. The unit carried this first flag during the Battle of Sharpsburg. If this flag has survived, it has not been identified.

Author Glenn Dedmondt identifies the second flag which was carried by the Third Arkansas as a three-foot-square flag which is currently in the collection of the Old State House Museum in Little Rock Arkansas. The Old State House Museum, Little Rock, identifies this flag as an artillery guidon. The flag was donated to the Old State House Museum by the family of Private R. Jessie Bailey, 3rd Arkansas Infantry, regimental band. The flag was allegedly made for the unit by the ladies of Fredericksburg, Virginia, while the regiment was stationed there in the winter of 1862. It is likely that regimental color bearer James M. Johnson was killed while carrying this flag at the Battle of Chickamauga, 19 September 1863. The flag, an Army of Northern Virginia Battle Flag, is 35 1/2 inches × 35 1/2 inches square; orange border; 5-inch stripe of the St. Andrew's cross; and thirteen stars made of bunting and cotton with a canvas lead.

The third flag carried by the Third Arkansas is an Army of Northern Virginia Battle Flag pattern made of bunting and cotton with canvas lead, 47 inches × 46 inches. Glenn Dedmondt identifies the flag as a 3rd bunting issue flag made by the Richmond Depot. The flag was issued to the unit on September 20, 1863, on the field of Chickamauga, and was probably carried until approximately 1 January 1865. Private Spencer Young, who was wounded carrying the flag in the Battle of the Wilderness, saved the flag and carried it back to the state. It remained in his custody until donated to the Old State House Museum, Little Rock in the 1920s.

The fourth and final flag of the Third Arkansas was a Richmond Depot 4th Bunting issue flag which is currently in the collections of the Museum of the Confederacy, in Richmond, Virginia. The 51-inch by 50-inch flag has a red bunting field crossed with 7-inch blue bunting bars in a St. Andrew's Cross with 3/8-inch white cotton fimbriation. There are thirteen 5 1/2-inch stars on the cross. This flag was surrendered by the regiment at Appomattox Courthouse, Virginia and was assigned capture number 411.

== Surrender ==
When General Robert E. Lee surrendered at Appomattox Courthouse on April 9, 1865, only 144 men of the Third Arkansas remained out of the 1,353 mustered into it from the start of the war.

== See also ==
- List of Confederate units from Arkansas
