= Randolph, Arizona =

- Populated place
- Location within the state of Arizona Randolph (the United States)
- Coordinates: 32°55′01″N 111°30′53″W
- Country: United States
- State: Arizona
- County: Pinal
- Elevation: 1,440 ft (439 m)
- Time zone: UTC-7 (Mountain (MST))
  - Summer (DST): UTC-7 (MST)
- Area code: 520
- FIPS code: 04-58920
- GNIS feature ID: 9954

Randolph is a historically black populated place in Pinal County, Arizona, United States, located approximately 15 miles north of Picacho, and near Casa Grande. The community was named after Epes Randolph, a vice-president and general manager of the Southern Pacific Railroad, who founded the town in the early 1920s. Randolph wanted to establish a successful city near Casa Grande. On July 18, 1925, the Randolph Post Office opened, with Channing E. Babbitt as its postmaster. With the increased need for agricultural workers which arose in the late 1920s, hundreds of farm workers migrated to the area in the 1930s. Many of those who settled in Randolph were black migrants from Oklahoma. This influx created a community which was predominantly black. The post office closed in 1983.
