= Epes Randolph =

American civil engineer

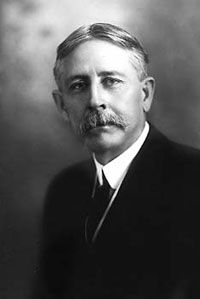
- Born: August 16, 1856; Lunenburg County, Virginia, US
- Died: August 22, 1921 (aged 65); Tucson, Arizona, US
- Resting place: Evergreen Cemetery, Tucson Arizona; 32.2654°N 110.9788°W
- Occupation: Railroad Executive
- Spouse: Eleanor Gridley Taylor (1886–1921)

Epes Randolph (August 16, 1856 – August 22, 1921) was an American civil engineer and businessman who constructed railroads in America's South, Ohio, Arizona, California, and Mexico. From 1905 to 1907 he led the successful effort to restore the Colorado River to its banks after irrigation canal construction and flooding diverted it from the Gulf of California and into California's Imperial Valley, creating the Salton Sea. Randolph spent his later life in Tucson, Arizona, where he served as president of several railroads, as vice-president of Tucson's Consolidated National Bank, and as chancellor of the University of Arizona Board of Regents.

== Early life ==
Randolph was born in Lunenburg County, Virginia. His parents were also natives of Virginia, his father, William Eston Randolph, having been born in Clarke County, and his mother, Sarah Lavinia Epes, in Lunenburg County.

== Career ==
=== Railroad ===
Between the years 1876 and 1885, Epes Randolph worked for several railroads performing location, construction, and maintenance. Railroads he worked for included the Alabama Great Southern Railroad, the Chesapeake, Ohio & Southwestern, and the Kentucky Central. From 1885 to 1890 Randolph was chief engineer of the Kentucky Central R.R., headquartered in Covington, Kentucky. He was also chief engineer of Cincinnati Elevated Railway, Transfer & Bridge Company. Both companies were owned by Collis P. Huntington. From 1886 to 1889 Randolph oversaw the construction of the C&O Railroad Bridge, a double track railway, highway, and foot traffic bridge across the Ohio River, connecting Covington, Kentucky, with Cincinnati, Ohio. In 1890 Randolph became chief engineer and superintendent of the Newport News & Mississippi Valley Co., the Ohio & Big Sandy Railroad Co. and the Kentucky & S. Atlantic Railroads. During this time he acquired the reputation of being an effective and efficient railroad head. From 1891 to 1894 Randolph was chief engineer and general superintendent of the Chesapeake, Ohio & Southwestern Railroad.

In 1894 he developed tuberculosis. He resigned, moved west and for a year worked as a consulting engineer to several railroads while recuperating. He first lived in Indio, California, before moving to Tucson, Arizona, in August 1895 when he became the superintendent for the Southern Pacific Railroad lines from El Paso to Los Angeles. Randolph held this position until 1901. Concurrently he was manager of the Los Angeles Railway & the Pacific Electric Railway. 700 miles of electric lines were built and operating. Randolph served as president of the Los Angeles Railway and the Pacific Electric Railway from 1901 to 1904. He then assumed the role of vice president and general manager.

From 1904 to 1909 Randolph served as vice president and general manager of the Gila Valley, Globe and Northern Railway and the Maricopa, Phoenix & Salt River Valley Railroad Co. In June 1909 he became the general manager of the Cananea, Yaqui River & Pacific R.R. Co. in Mexico. All three railroads were owned by E. H. Harriman.

In 1905 Harriman, president of the Southern Pacific Railroad Company, asked Randolph to lead the task of closing a breach in the Colorado River. Randolph did so while bedridden in his private railway car the "Pocahontas". After two years and thousands of tons of rock being poured in the breach was closed on February 10, 1907.

In 1911 Randolph became president of the Southern Pacific Railroad of Mexico and Arizona Eastern Railway. He held these positions until his death in 1921.

=== Other ===
In 1904 Randolph and Levi Manning, Tucson's mayor from 1905–1907, partnered to build the upscale Santa Rita Hotel, said at the time to be the most modern hotel in the Southwest. Randolph occupied a suite at the Santa Rita at the time of his death. Randolph was president of the California Development Company, a project to irrigate desert land in eastern California.

== Civic activities ==
Epes Randolph was a life member of the Elks lodge, an honorary 33d degree Mason, and president of the Old Pueblo Club at the time of his death.

Epes Randolph became a member of the University of Arizona Board of Regents in 1916, and was president of the Board of Regents and chairman of the executive committee at the time of his death.

== Failing health ==
After many years of suffering from tuberculosis, Epes Randolph suffered a series of severe pulmonary hemorrhages in January 1921. Randolph spent February 1921 recuperating in Empalme, Sonora, returning to Tucson in early March. In June Randolph vacationed in California for five weeks, where he was examined and his health appeared to mostly return. He returned to Tucson on August 12.

== Death and tribute ==
On Monday, August 22, 1921, Epes Randolph worked a full day at the executive offices of the Arizona Eastern Railroad. Feeling "unusually strong and well" Randolph took a short automobile ride with his wife after work. They had supper at the Santa Rita Hotel and retired to their suite. Instead of turning to bed early as he normally did, he was reading a newspaper when he suffered a pulmonary hemorrhage seizure shortly after 10 pm. Randolph's wife called a doctor to attend him, and though he partially recovered for a few minutes, he was unable to speak and died shortly thereafter. He was sixty five years old.

Reaction to Randolph's death was swift and extensive. Though in poor health, Randolph's death was unexpected and met with shock. On Tuesday, August 23, his death was front-page news with photographs in the morning Arizona Daily Star, the evening Tucson Citizen, and the Arizona Gazette of Phoenix. The three office buildings of the Southern Pacific, the Eastern Arizona Railroad, and the Southern Pacific de Mexico in Tucson were closed and draped with black crepe in mourning. The offices remained closed until Friday. That afternoon the Tucson City Council passed a resolution in honor of Epes Randolph in special session. The Kiwanis Club eulogized Randolph and held a moment of silence. Randolph's body was laid in state at the Scottish Masonic temple. The casket was completely hidden behind floral arrangements that stretched across the rostrum from wall to wall.

On Wednesday, August 24, the flag was lowered to half mast on the Arizona State Capitol for the day upon news of his death. All trains and depots of the Arizona Eastern, Southern Pacific, and the Southern Pacific de Mexico railroad were draped in mourning until after the funeral. The executive board of the Retail Merchant's Association and the board of directors of the Chamber of Commerce passed resolutions requesting all members to close at 4 PM the following day. The Board of Supervisors of Pima County passed a resolution in honor of Randolph. University of Arizona president Dr. von KleinSmid wrote a tribute for Randolph on behalf of the officials and faculty of the University of Arizona. That night a Knights Templar service was held at 8 pm, followed by a Kadosh ceremony at midnight. Reported as "extremely brilliant and beautiful" and "performed only upon rarest occasions," Randolph was the first person to be honored with a Kadosh ceremony in Arizona.

On Thursday, August 25, every business, store, and county office in Tucson closed at 4 pm. The Masonic temple was filled to capacity of 700 people for the 5 o'clock funeral rites. Tucson police had additional traffic officers on duty as a crowd of over 1000 gathered outside. Over 100 mourners, including the Arizona state Governor Thomas E. Campbell, state officials, Phoenix members of the Masons, and businessmen traveled by train from Phoenix to Tucson for the funeral. At 5 PM, all trains and every wheel in the shops of the Southern Pacific, Arizona Eastern and Southern Pacific of Mexico railroads stopped for one minute to mark his death. After the ceremony at the Masonic Temple, the funeral procession traveled to Evergreen Cemetery for interment. The funeral procession crossed the railroad tracks to the cemetery and a train was stopped as the funeral procession passed. Another Masonic ceremony, longer than the 5 o'clock ceremony, was held at the grave site.

== Named after Epes Randolph ==
In 1908 The village of Randolph, California, was founded just south of Brea Canyon.

The Epes Randolph Lodge No. 32 of Free & Accepted Masons was chartered on February 14, 1923, in Tucson, Arizona.

Randolph Street in Brea, California, Randolph Street in Huntington Park, California, and Randolph Way in Tucson, Arizona, are named for him.

Randolph, Arizona, located in Pinal County was founded in the early 1920s.

Randolph Park, A 480-acre park in central Tucson created four years after Randolph's death was named in his honor. A bust, accompanied by four plaques detailing his life's work, is located near the park's center, at Camino Campestre and Randolph Way.
