= Joseph Austin Holmes =

1st Director of U.S. Bureau of Mines

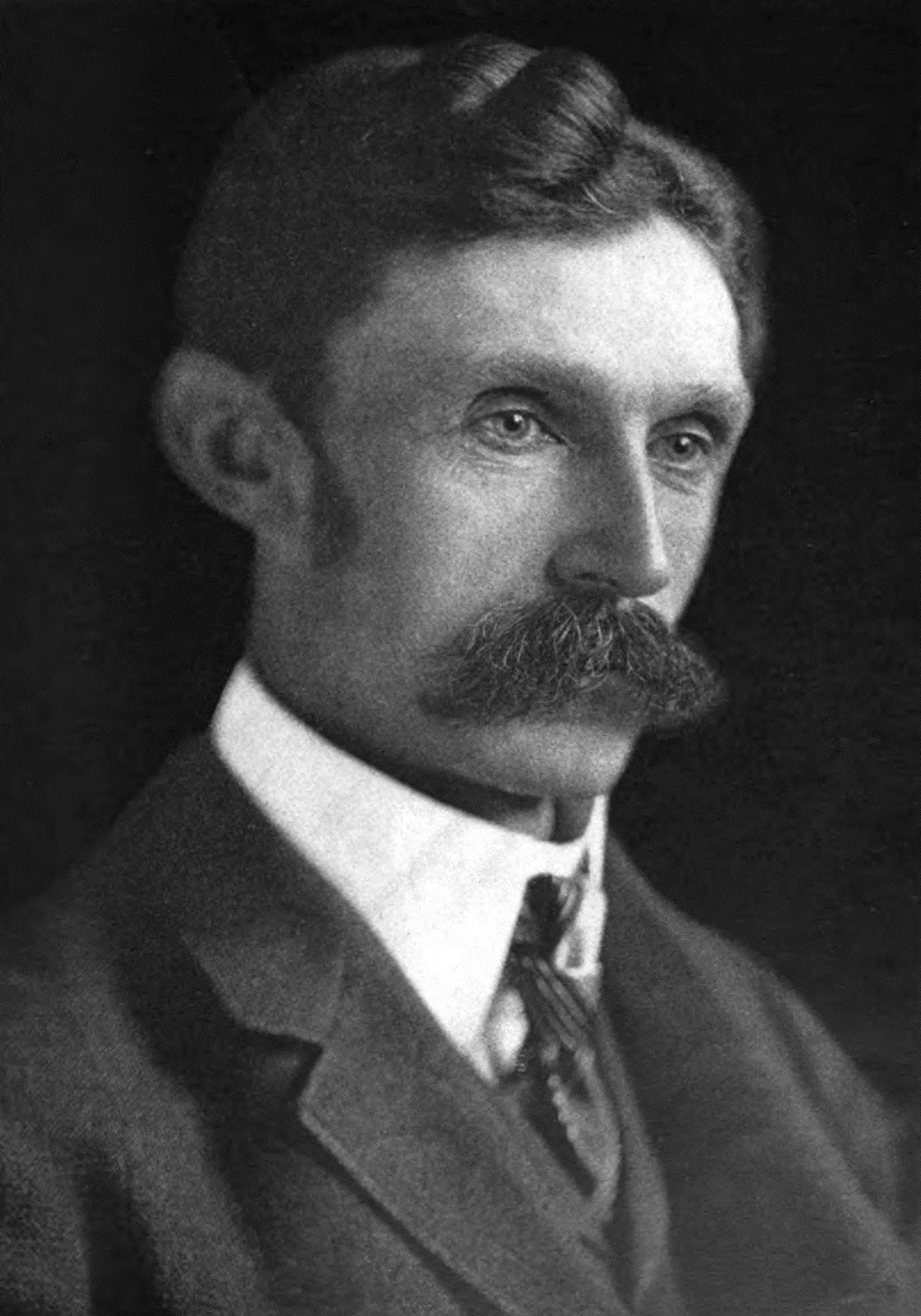
- Holmes (c. 1911)

1st Director of the U.S. Bureau of Mines
- In office 1910–1915
- Preceded by: Bureau established
- Succeeded by: Van H. Manning

Personal details
- Born: January 23, 1859 Laurens, South Carolina, U.S.
- Died: July 13, 1915 (aged 56) Denver, Colorado, U.S.
- Resting place: Rock Creek Cemetery; Washington, D.C., U.S.
- Spouse: Jean Daiziel Sprunt
- Children: 4
- Education: Cornell University (BS); University of North Carolina, Chapel Hill (LL.D.); University of Pittsburgh (PhD)
- Scientific career
- Fields: Geology; Agriculture
- Workplaces: University of North Carolina, Chapel Hill (1881–1903); U.S. Geological Survey (1904–1910); U.S. Bureau of Mines (1910–1915)

Joseph Austin Holmes (January 23, 1859 – July 13, 1915) was a geologist and occupational safety and health pioneer, best known as the first director of the U.S. Bureau of Mines. He is the namesake of the Joseph A. Holmes Safety Association created in 1916.

== Early life and education ==
Joseph Austin Holmes was born on January 23, 1859, in Laurens, South Carolina. He was one of 12 children, and attended Laurens Academy. He graduated from Cornell University in 1881 with a Bachelor of Science in agriculture.

Holmes also got a LL.D. from the University of North Carolina and a PhD from the University of Pittsburgh.

== Career ==
In 1881, Holmes was appointed as professor of geology and natural history at the University of North Carolina, Chapel Hill. He served as department head from 1881 to 1891 and left the university in 1903. He was appointed as the first state geologist of North Carolina in 1891 and served in that role until 1905. He was in charge of the North Carolina Geological Survey. Holmes organized the North Carolina Good Roads Association and served as its president. He organized and directed the Department of Mines and Metallurgy at the St. Louis World's Fair in 1903 and 1904. He was also appointed to a congressional committee involved in investigating better ways to use domestically produced fuels and materials.

Impressed by his work at the World's Fair, President Theodore Roosevelt appointed Holmes as chief of the U.S. Geological Survey laboratories in 1904. In 1907, he was appointed as chief of the new technological branch of the U.S. Geological Survey, the division in charge of investigating mine accidents.

In 1910, Holmes was appointed by President Taft as the Director of the newly formed U.S. Bureau of Mines. The appointment came as a surprise to many because of tensions existing between Holmes and the Secretary of the Interior Richard A. Ballinger. Under Holmes's leadership, the first national mine safety demonstration was hosted in an experimental mine in Pittsburgh, Pennsylvania. He also helped develop the Weeks Act, 1911 legislation that facilitated the creation of national forests.

Holmes discovered that the dust from black coal was more dangerous than firedamp for miners. He discovered that coal dust could also cause mine explosions. This ended the dangerous practice of packing explosives in boreholes using coal dust. He organized the Explosives and Electrical Sections of the Bureau to improve safety in mines and equipped railroad cars as movable stations used to train miners in first aid and rescue operations.

He was a fellow of the Geological Society of America.

== Personal life ==
Holmes married Jean Daiziel Sprunt of Wilmington, North Carolina. Together, they had four children: Joseph, James, Jean and Margaret.

His contemporaries sometimes referred to him as "Joe Holmes".

== Death ==
Holmes contracted tuberculosis in 1914 and died of the disease in Denver, Colorado, on July 13, 1915. He was interred at Rock Creek Cemetery in Washington, D.C.

== Legacy ==
A year after his death, in 1916, the Joseph A. Holmes Safety Association was established to pay respect and honor the work Holmes did.

Holmes was inducted posthumously into the National Mining Hall of Fame in 1990. He is remembered for coining the phrase "safety first", as used as a watchword in the mines.
