= Van. H. Manning =

American politician

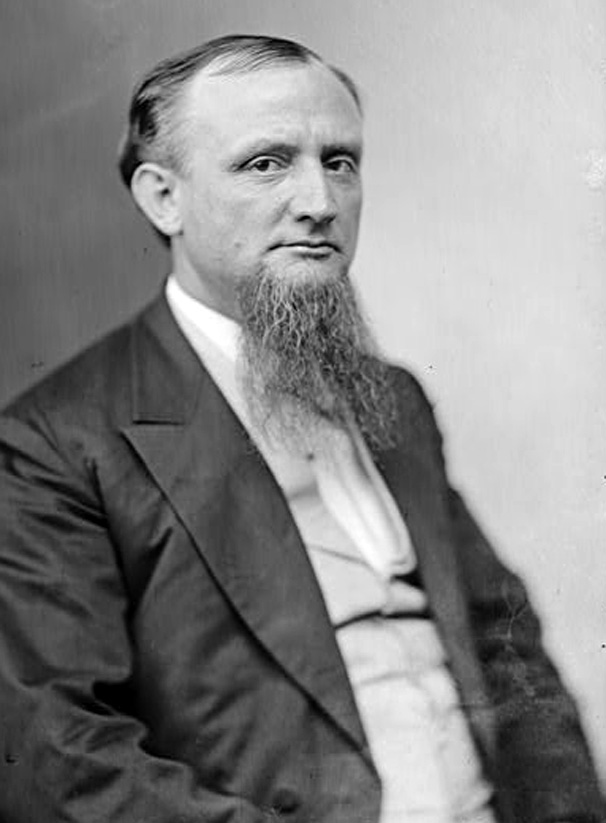
- Manning (c. 1865–1880)

Member of the U.S. House of Representatives from Mississippi's 2nd district
- In office March 4, 1877 – March 3, 1883
- Preceded by: G. Wiley Wells
- Succeeded by: James R. Chalmers

Personal details
- Born: Vannoy Hartrog Manning; July 26, 1839 Wake County, North Carolina
- Died: November 3, 1892 (aged 53) Prince George's County, Maryland, U.S.
- Resting place: Glenwood Cemetery, Washington, D.C. 38°55′23.1″N 77°00′20.7″W
- Party: Democratic
- Spouse: Mary Z. Wallace
- Children: 8, including Levi and Van H.
- Education: University of Nashville

Military service
- Allegiance: Confederate States
- Service: Confederate States Army
- Years of service: 1861–1865
- Rank: Colonel
- Commands: 3rd Arkansas Infantry Regiment (1862–64)
- Battles: American Civil War; Battle of Cheat Mountain; Battle of Antietam (WIA); Battle of Gettysburg (WIA); Battle of the Wilderness (WIA) (POW)

Vannoy Hartrog Manning (July 26, 1839 – November 3, 1892) was an American politician and military officer who served as the U.S. representative from Mississippi's 2nd congressional district (1877–1883). Prior to this he was colonel of the 3rd Arkansas Infantry Regiment, serving from 1862 until wounded and captured by Union forces in 1864.

== Early life and education ==
Born in 1839 in Wake County, North Carolina, Manning moved as a child in 1841 with his parents to Mississippi. He attended the private school, Horn Lake Male Academy, in De Soto County in the Mississippi Delta. Manning attended the University of Nashville in Tennessee, where he studied law. After graduation, he and his wife moved to Arkansas in 1860. He was admitted to the Arkansas bar in 1861 and commenced practice in Hamburg.

== American Civil War ==
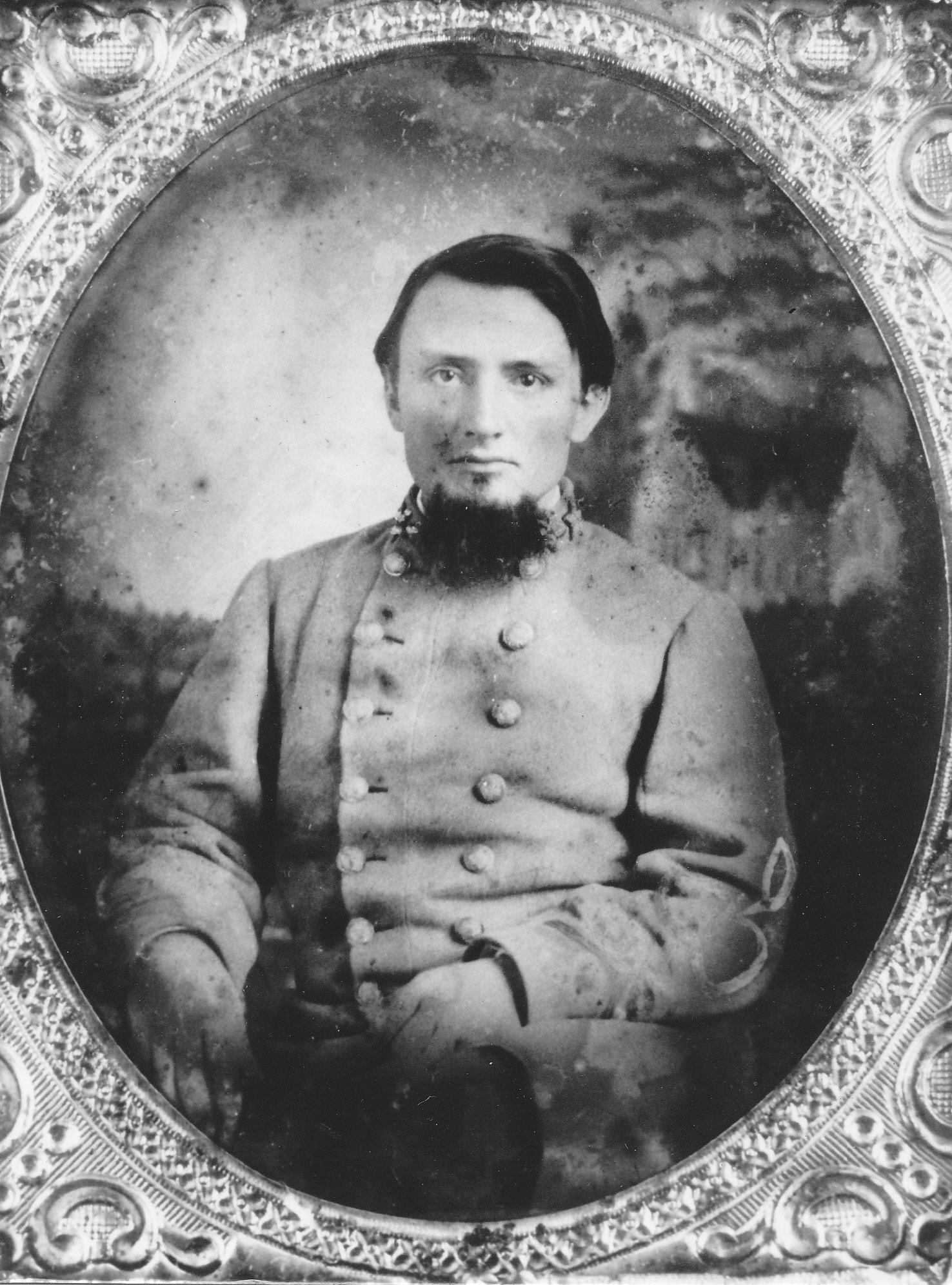
Manning during the Civil War

In May 1861, Manning and Dr. W. H. Tebbs recruited and organized the 3rd Arkansas Infantry Regiment, drawing from soldiers recruited in Ashley, Drew, Union, Dallas and Hot Spring counties. The regiment made up a total of eleven companies, and included one company of recruits from other parts of Arkansas, as well as recruits from Tennessee and Kentucky.

They marched to Vicksburg, Mississippi, where they were initially turned down for service as a part of the Confederate Army. Manning gained the assistance of Arkansas politician Albert Rust, and the regiment was accepted as part of the army. Rust was commissioned as colonel, and sent to Lynchburg, Virginia for training. The Third Arkansas was assigned to General Robert E. Lee's Army of Northern Virginia, after which it took part in almost every major eastern battle.

Tebbs and Manning both served as captains. Later Manning was promoted to colonel of the Third Arkansas, following Rust's being promoted to brigadier general. Manning was wounded at the battles of Antietam (Sharpsburg), Gettysburg, and The Wilderness.

Regimental Colors of
the Third Arkansas

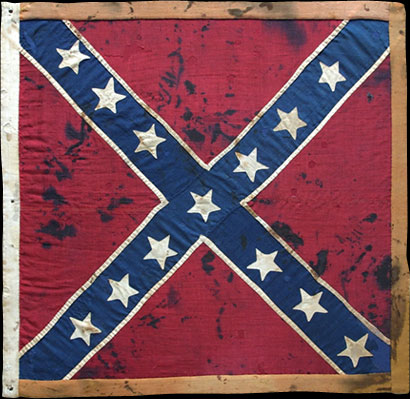
1862–1863

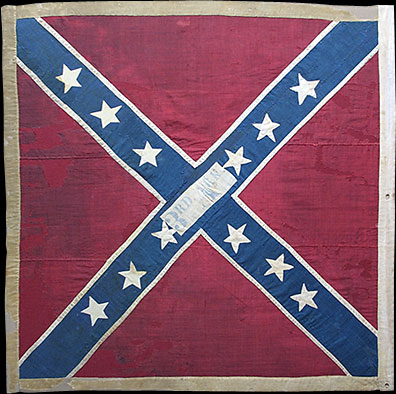
1863–1865

Manning's reputation for heroism in battle became well known. He was cited in official reports for his actions during the Battle of Antietam and the Battle of Gettysburg. Reporting on him at Antietam, Confederate General John G. Walker, wrote as follows;

Colonel Manning, with the 46th and 48th North Carolina and 30th Virginia, not content with possession of the woods, dashed forward in gallant style, crossed the open fields beyond, driving the enemy back before him like sheep, until, arriving at a long line of strong post and rail fences, behind which heavy masses of the enemies infantry were lying, their advance was checked, and it being impossible to climb these fences under such fire, these regiments, after suffering a heavy loss, were compelled to fall back ...

Just before the falling back of these regiments, the gallant Colonel Manning was severely wounded and was compelled to leave the field, relinquishing the command of the brigade to the next rank, Colonel E.D. Hall, of the 46th North Carolina Regiment.

... The division suffered heavily, particularly Manning's command (Walker's Brigade), which at one time sustained almost the whole fire of the enemies right wing. Going into the engagement, as it was necessary for us to do, to support the sorely pressed divisions of Hood and Early, it was, of course, impossible to make dispositions based upon careful reconnaissance of the localities. The post and rail fences stretching across the fields lying between us and the enemies position, I regard as the fatal obstacle to complete our success on the left, and success there would be, doubtless, have changed the fate of the day. Of the existence of this obstacle none of my division had any previous knowledge, and we learned it at the expense of many valuable lives.

Manning was later commended again for gallantry, during the Battle of Gettysburg, by Brigadier General Jerome B. Robertson of the Texas Brigade, to which the Third Arkansas had been attached. In that action, Robertson's brigade had been ordered forward to attack and secure Devil's Den. The 1st, 4th, and 5th Texas regiments, alongside the Third Arkansas, did so at great cost, taking heavy casualties but securing their objective. Robertson gave much of the credit for this success to Manning's leadership in the field. Manning was wounded toward the end of that engagement, after helping his regiment hold under overwhelming odds.

He was later wounded for a third time and captured during the Battle of the Wilderness in Virginia in 1864. Manning was held as a prisoner of war by Union forces until the end of the war. When the war ended, only 144 of his Third Arkansas soldiers had survived of 1,353 mustered into it at the start of the war.

== Later life and career ==
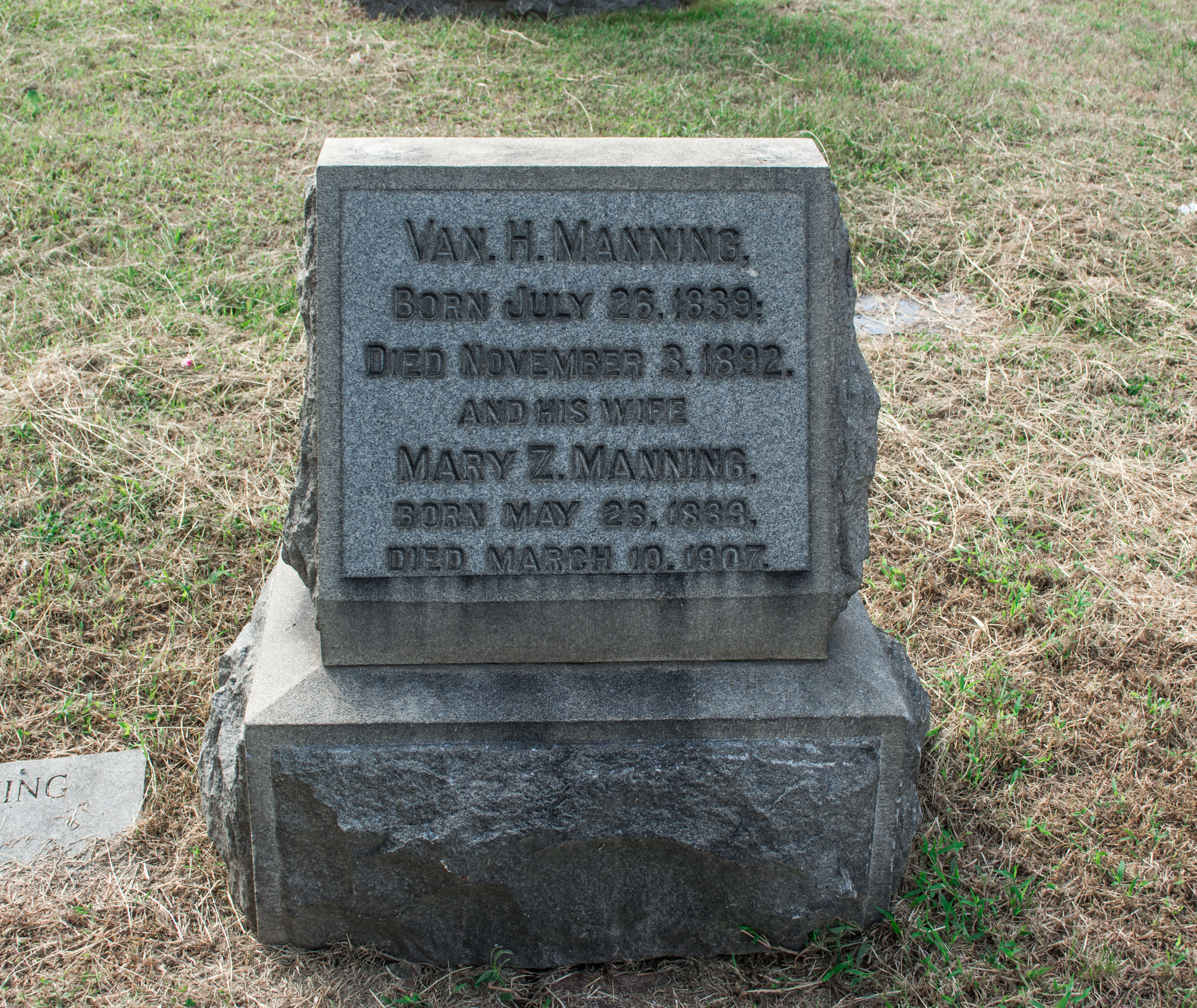
The Grave of Van. H. Manning at Glenwood Cemetery, Washington, D.C.

After the war, Manning moved with his family to Holly Springs, Mississippi, where he resumed the practice of law. In 1876 as the Democrats regained control of the state, he entered politics. He was elected as a Democrat from Mississippi's 2nd congressional district to the Forty-fifth, followed by re-election to the Forty-sixth, and Forty-seventh Congresses, serving from March 4, 1877–March 3, 1883. In 1883 he presented credentials as a Member-elect of 1882 to the Forty-eighth Congress, but was contested by his opponent James R. Chalmers, who had run as an Independent Democrat on a fusion ticket supported by Republicans and Greenbackers.

Manning resumed the practice of law in Washington, D.C., in 1883. On June 25, 1884, Congress awarded the seat to Chalmers. He left politics, returning to his law practice for his remaining years. He died on November 3, 1892, in Prince George's County, Maryland, and was interred in Glenwood Cemetery, Washington, D.C.

== Personal life ==
Manning married Mary Z. Wallace of Holly Springs. Their firstborn son died in January 1861 after their move to Arkansas. The second born, Levi H. Manning, later was elected mayor of Tucson, Arizona. The Mannings had a total of four sons and four daughters. One of his sons was Van H. Manning, the 2nd director of the U.S. Bureau of Mines.

== See also ==
- List of University of Nashville alumni

Military offices
| Preceded by Colonel Albert Rust | Commanding officer of the 3rd Arkansas Infantry Regiment; 1862–1864 | Succeeded by Lieutenant-Colonel Robert S. Taylor; Acting |
U.S. House of Representatives
| Preceded by G. Wiley Wells | Member of the U.S. House of Representatives from Mississippi's 2nd congressional district 1877–1883 | Succeeded by James R. Chalmers |
