= Reid Park Zoo =

Zoo in Tucson, Arizona

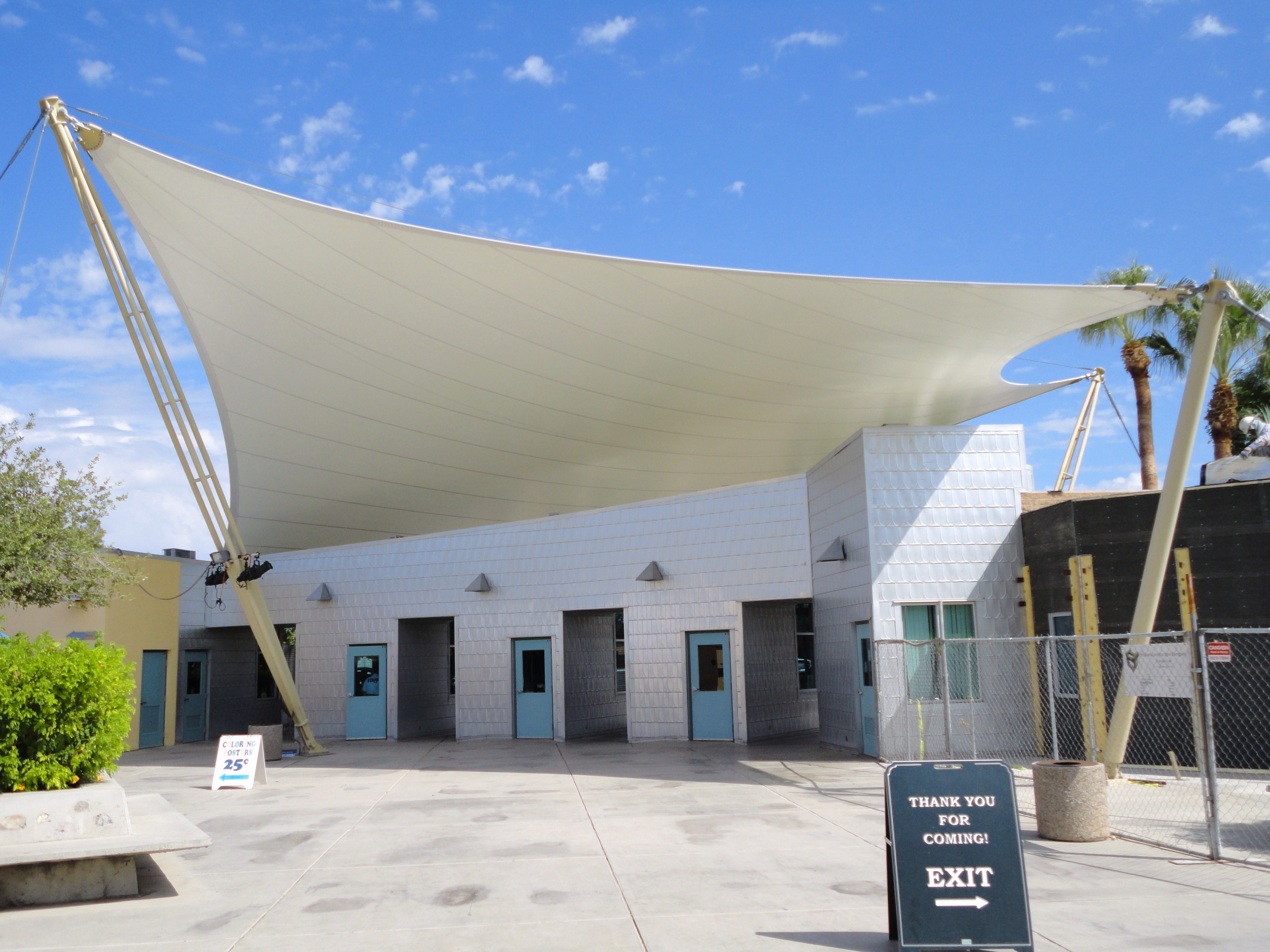
- Reid Park Zoo
- Interactive map of Reid Park Zoo
- 32.208°N 110.920°W
- Date opened: 1965
- Location: Tucson, Arizona, United States
- Land area: 24 acres (9.7 ha)
- No. of animals: 500+
- Memberships: AZA
- Website: reidparkzoo.org

The Reid Park Zoo, founded in 1967, is a 24-acre (9.7 ha) city-owned and -operated nonprofit zoo located within Reid Park in Tucson, Arizona. The zoo features more than 500 animals. It was unofficially established in 1965 by Gene Reid, the parks and recreation director at the time. The zoo receives approximately 500,000 visitors each year. It is accredited and certified with the Association of Zoos & Aquariums.

== Exhibits ==
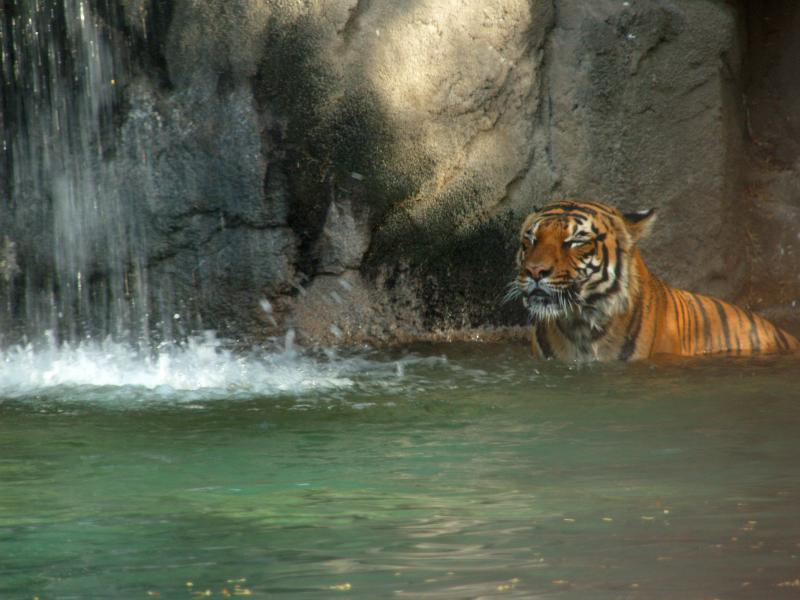
Malayan tiger near a waterfall in one of the exhibits.

Reid Park Zoo consists of four zones that are organized by the types of habitats and animals they house. The Adaptation Zone houses animals such as the grizzly bear and Aldabra giant tortoise, the South America zone houses animals such as the jaguar and spectacled bear, and the African Animals zone features animals such as the lion and giraffe. The African Animals zone also houses a 7-acre expansion (Expedition Tanzania), which was opened to the public in 2012. A large aviary named Flight Connection hosts dozens of species of birds from Australia, Africa, and Asia.

=== Expedition Tanzania ===
Expedition Tanzania is currently home to an all-female herd of five African bush elephants, Semba (the matriarch), Lungile (an unrelated female who serves as an allomother), Nandi (daughter of Mabu and Semba, the first-ever elephant to be born in Arizona—she was born on August 20, 2014), Penzi (daughter of Mabu and Semba, born on April 6, 2020) and Meru (born on March 8, 2024).

== History ==
=== 1960s ===
In 1965, a fledgling zoo was started by Gene Reid, then Parks and Recreation director, with exhibits of pheasants, peafowl, and guinea fowl just north of the present zoo site.

In the late 1960s, prairie dogs from Lubbock, Texas, were exhibited in "Prairie Dog Town" in the former "overlook" at Randolph Park. A 1.5 acre "collection of animals" become known as the "Randolph Park Children's Zoo". The first purchase of an "exotic" animal was made in the fall: a two-year-old male Asian elephant.

And in 1967 and 1968, the first budget of $49,000 presented to and approved by Tucson City Council, effectively opening the zoo and making it part of city operations. New animal additions included alligator, bear, camel, leopard, primates, and tapir. The zoo's name was changed to Randolph Park Zoo. A group called Friends of Gene Reid was informally organized to assist with everyday operations.

=== 1970s ===
Admission fees were instituted in 1972. J.L. Swigert became the zoo's first professional administrator. Michael Flint was hired as the zoo's first curator. The zoo was admitted to the Association of Zoos & Aquariums (then known as American Association of Zoos & Aquariums).

In 1975, Dr. Ivo Poglayen became the second zoo administrator and a combination entrance/gift shop was constructed on the south border of the zoo. The same year, Poglayen and staff members traveled to the San Diego Zoo Wild Animal Park to bring two rhinos, Zibulo and Yebonga to the zoo and had an enclosure constructed for them. Yebonga, born in 1973, has resided at the Tucson zoo since this time and in 2024 was the longest resident there, known as "The Queen of the Reid Park Zoo."

Macaw Island was constructed in 1976, and Friends of Gene Reid became Friends of Randolph Zoo Society, Inc.

The African Veldt (zebra and ostrich area) exhibit was built and animals were purchased for it in 1977, and the first and second classes of docents (volunteers) were organized and trained.

In 1978, the Asian Grasslands exhibit was constructed and opened. The zoo's size expanded to 15 acres with the purchase of 2 acres on the east side. The zoo's name was changed to Reid Park Zoo when the park's name changed. Friends of Randolph Zoo Society, Inc. was incorporated as the Tucson Zoological Society.

The health center and administration offices were constructed and opened in 1979.

=== 1980s ===
In 1981, an entrance, gift shop, and snack bar were constructed at the north end of the zoo, and the zoo's size increased to 17 acres with acquisition of more land. The next year, the current snack bar was built and became operational and the waterfowl exhibit was constructed and opened in September. The former entrance/gift shop building on the south side of the zoo was remodeled into the zoo school and docent headquarters.

Steve McCusker became the third administrator in October 1986, and the next year Kerry Hoffman became the first education curator. In 1988, construction was completed on the new zoo administration building in July.

=== 1990s ===
In 1990, the first executive director for the Tucson Zoological Society was hired in August, and in 1991, Susan Basford became the second education curator in January. She became the fourth zoo administrator four years later.

In 1992, the former Asian Grassland area was converted into the new African Savanna and new African species were introduced. The first Festival of Lights event was also held. Extensive remodeling of the zoo school was completed in 1993, and the first "ZOOcson" fundraiser event was held.

In 1996, Vivian VanPeenen became the third education curator and the first "Howl-o-ween" event was held.

The Flight Connection Aviary opened in December 1999.

=== 2000s ===
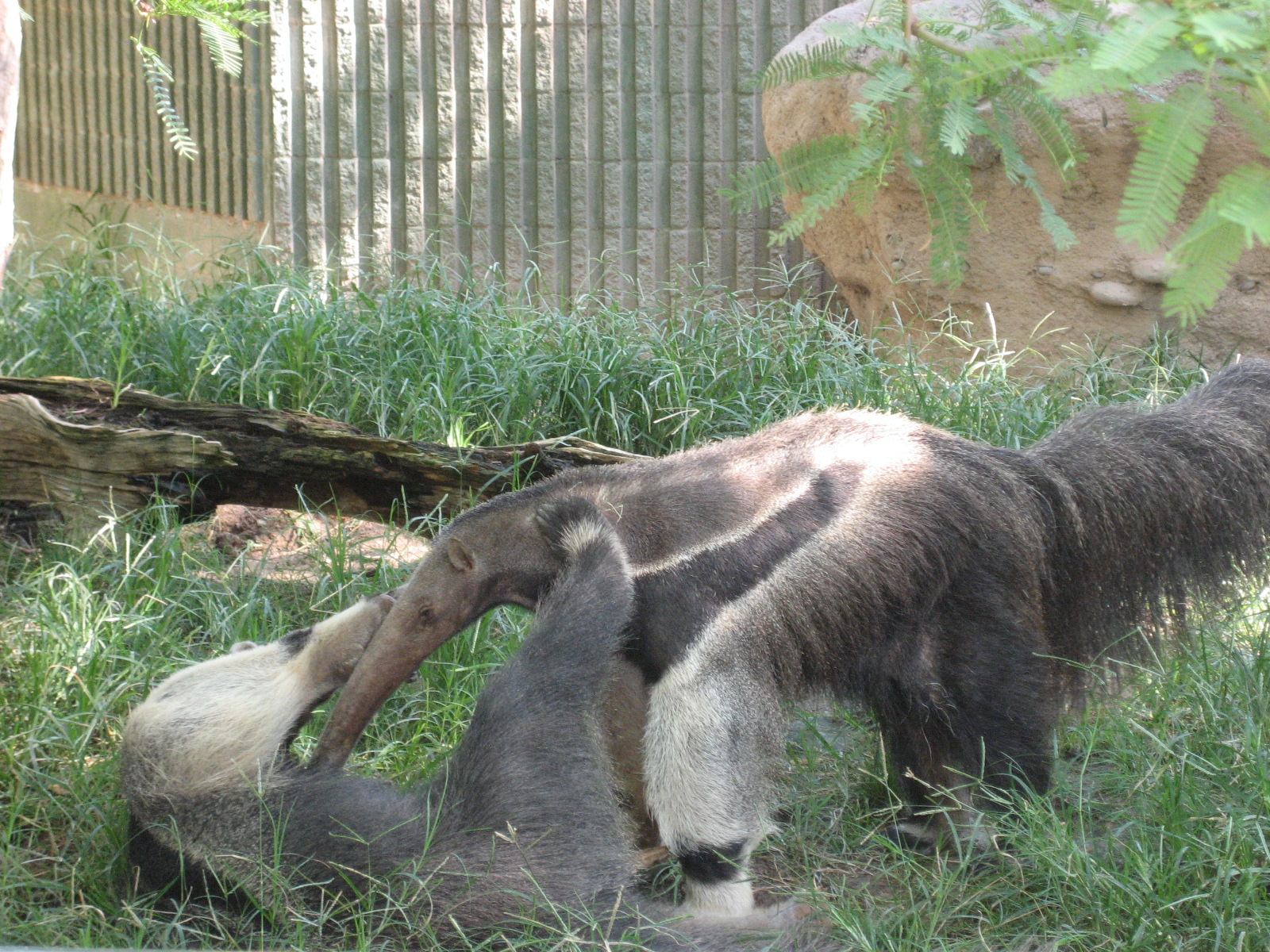
Giant anteaters playing at Reid Park Zoo

In 2003, the polar bear exhibit was expanded to include a natural substrate yard and a new front gate was completed.

Scott Barton became the zoo's second general curator in 2004. In 2007, Kenya Get Wet splash pad opened. The next year, the Lee H. Brown Family Conservation Learning Center was completed.

Jim Schnormeier became the third general curator in 2009, and the Zoofari Café was remodeled and included indoor seating for the first time.

=== 2010s ===
The Gift Shop was remodeled in 2010, and groundbreaking for the Expedition Tanzania expansion, the new elephant exhibit, took place. The expansion opened in 2012.

In 2013, Jason Jacobs was named as the zoo's fifth administrator. In 2014, a female African elephant calf was born in August, the first ever born in the state of Arizona.

In 2015, the zoo hosted Bear TAG conference, the Wildlife Carousel opened, and a Baird's tapir was born. Zoo management changed from City of Tucson to Reid Park Zoological Society in 2018, and the new Animal Health Center opened.

=== 2020s ===
In 2023, a pair of blue duikers was added to the zoo. In October 2024, Tsavo the African bull elephant arrived from Disney's Animal Kingdom to breed with Reid Park Zoo's residential African cow elephants.

List of animals
Asia
- White-handed gibbon
- Malayan tiger

South America

- Spectacled bear
- Baird's tapir
- Black-necked swan
- Capybara
- Galapagos tortoise
- Giant anteater
- Greater rhea
- Jaguar
- Pacu
- Squirrel monkey
- Sloth

South American Aviary

- Blue-crowned motmot
- Boat-billed heron
- King vulture
- Ringed teal
- Roseate spoonbill
- Saffron finch
- Scarlet ibis
- Silver-beaked tanager
- Troupial
- White-faced whistling duck
- Wood duck
- Yellow-knobbed curassow

Africa

- African crowned crane
- African elephant
- African lion
- Black-and-white ruffed lemur
- Blue duiker
- Common ostrich
- Domestic goat
- Grevy’s zebra
- Ring-Tailed Lemur
- Meerkat
- Reticulated giraffe
- Southern white rhinoceros
- Speke's gazelle
- Spotted-necked otter

Adaption Zone

- African spurred tortoise
- American Alligators
- African Painted Dogs
- Chilean flamingo
- Grizzly bear
- Lion-tailed macaque
- Indian Peafowl

Flight Connection Aviary

- Bald ibis
- Bearded barbet
- Black crake
- Blue-billed teal (Anas hottentota)
- Bruce's green pigeon
- Cape thick-knee
- Golden-breasted starling
- Great argus
- Great Indian hornbill
- Luzon bleeding-heart
- Marbled teal
- Nicobar pigeon
- Red-whiskered bulbul
- Sulfur-crested cockatoo
- Taveta golden weaver
- Trumpeter hornbill
- Violet turaco
- White-cheeked turaco
- White-rumped shama

Conservation Learning Center

- Bearded dragon
- Blessed poison frog
- Brazilian cockroach
- Golden poison frog
- Green tree python
- Strawberry poison frog
- Yellow-headed poison frog
- Splash-back poison frog

== Medical facilities ==
Reid Park Zoo has the unique ability to treat animals with cancer using radiation therapy and heat therapy. Through a partnership with the University of Arizona Cancer Center, radiation oncologists can treat animals that are transported to the zoo from all over the country, such as a Galapagos tortoise that was treated in 1983.

== Effects of activism ==
Early in 2006, a group of local activists named Save Tucson Elephants lobbied the city to move Reid Park Zoo's two elephants, Connie and Shaba, to a sanctuary in Tennessee. However, the city council decided instead to raise funds to build a new elephant enclosure, after receiving public petitions to keep the elephants in Tucson.

== Gallery ==
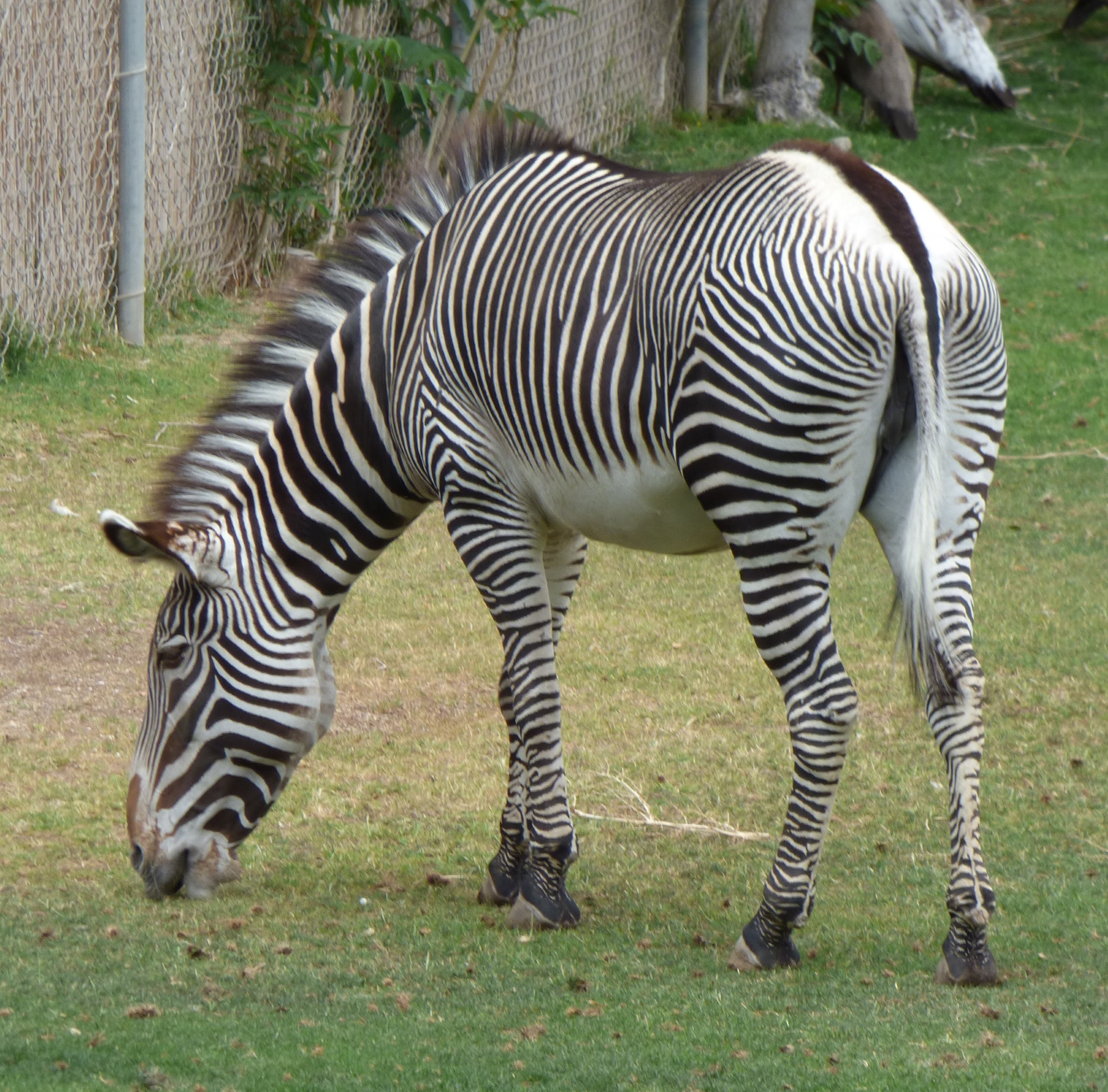
Zebra eating grass.

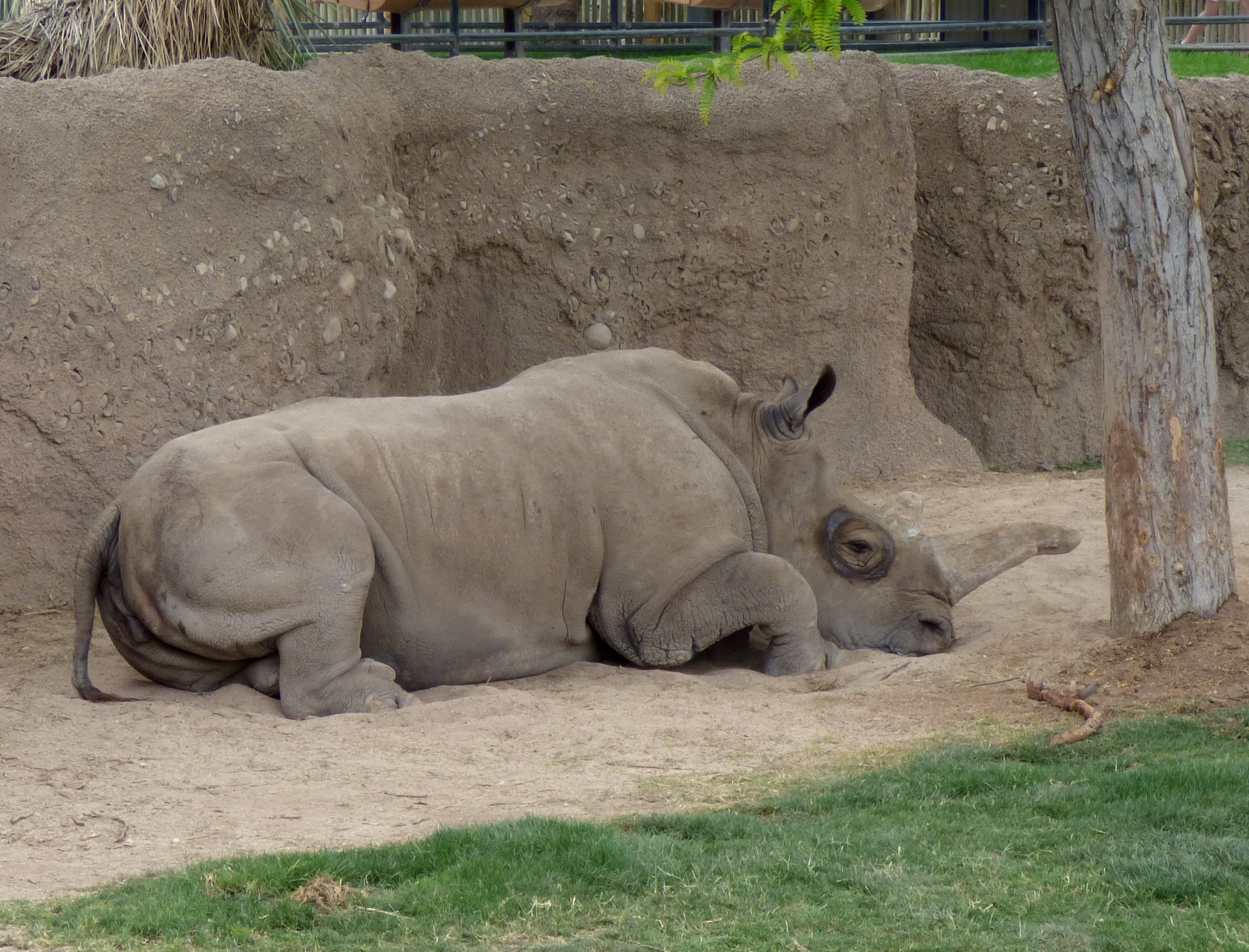
Rhinoceros resting in the sand.

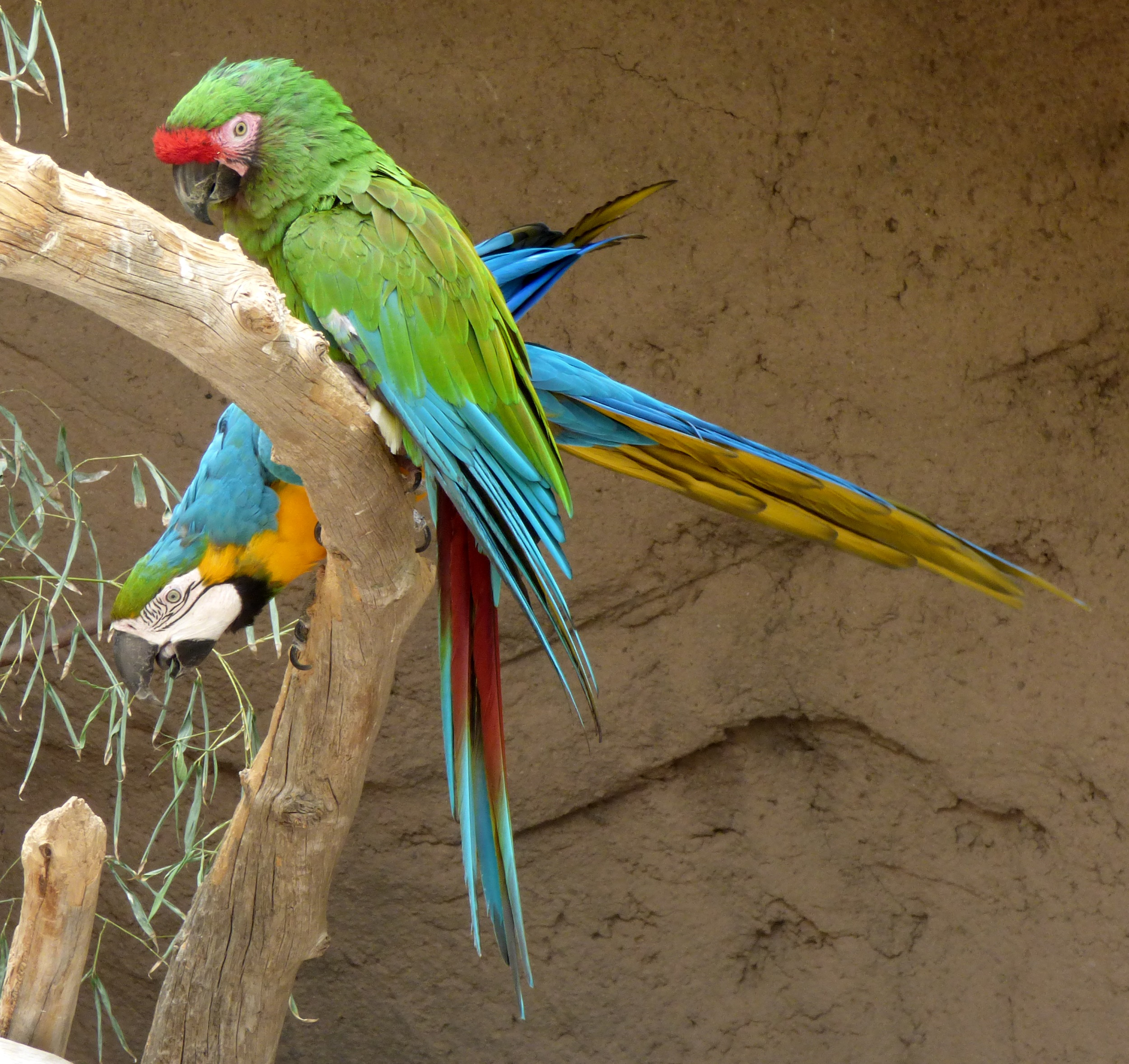
Green & Blue macaws in an exhibit.

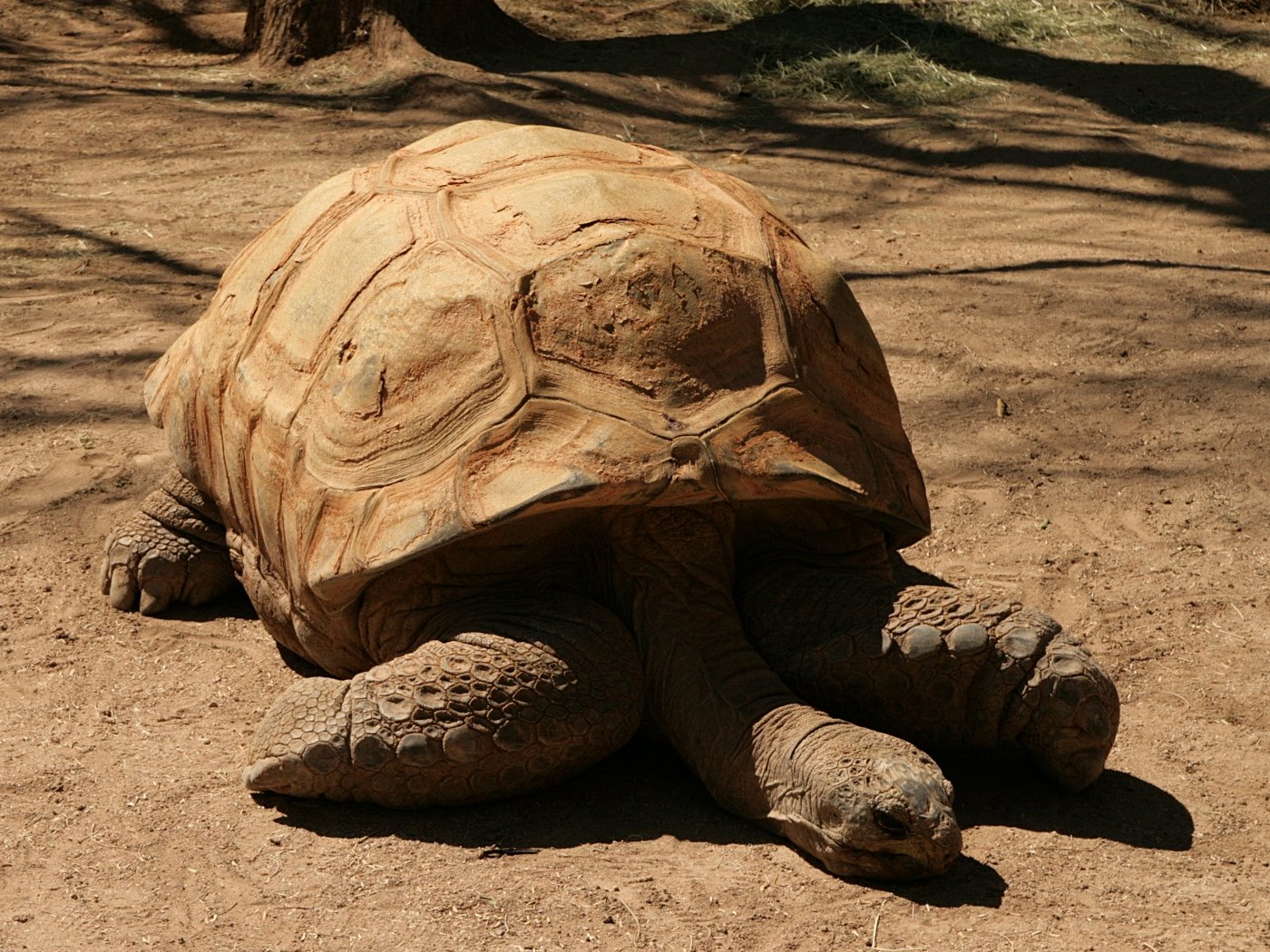
Aldabra giant tortoise (Aldabrachelys gigantea).

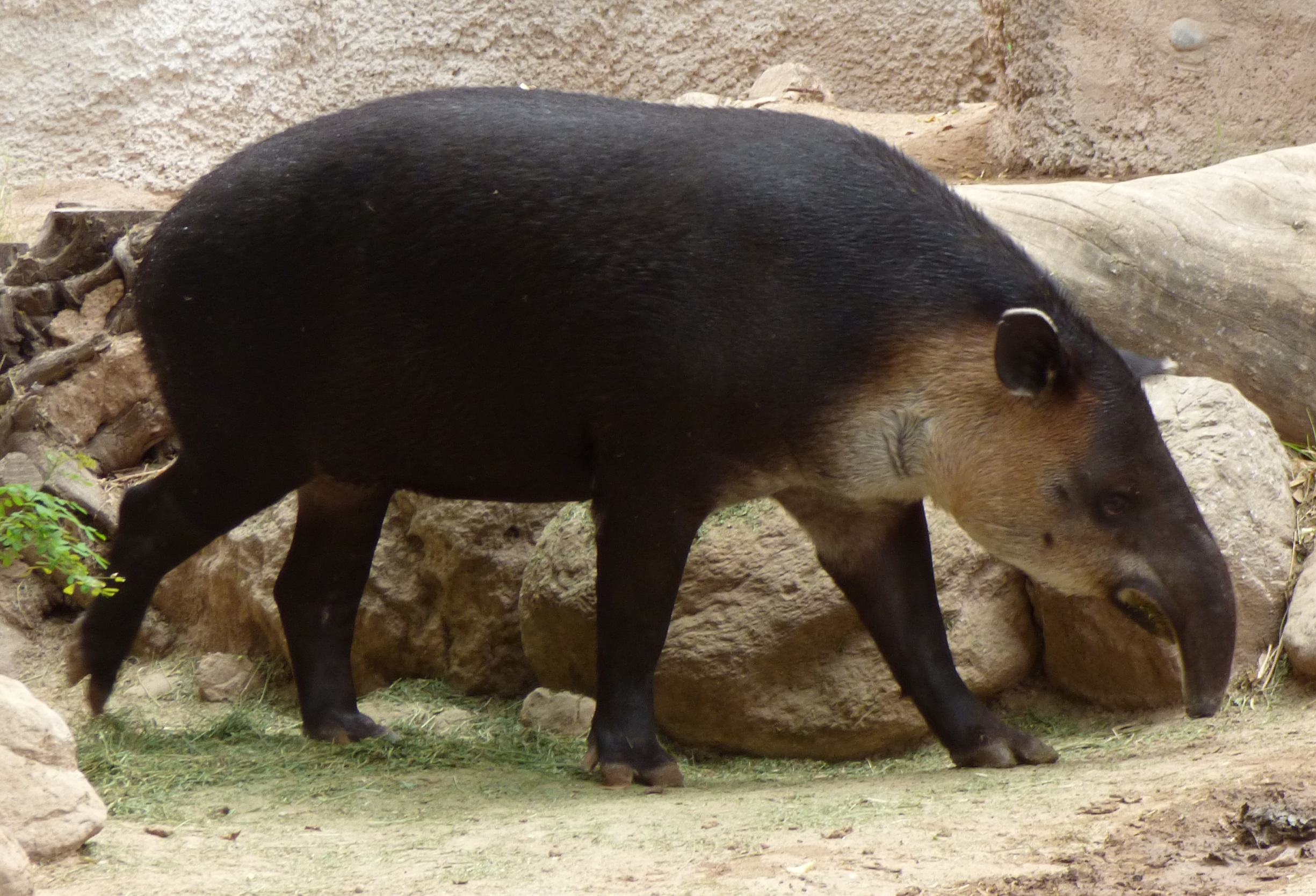
Tapir in an exhibit.
