= Van H. Manning (engineer) =

2nd Director of U.S. Bureau of Mines

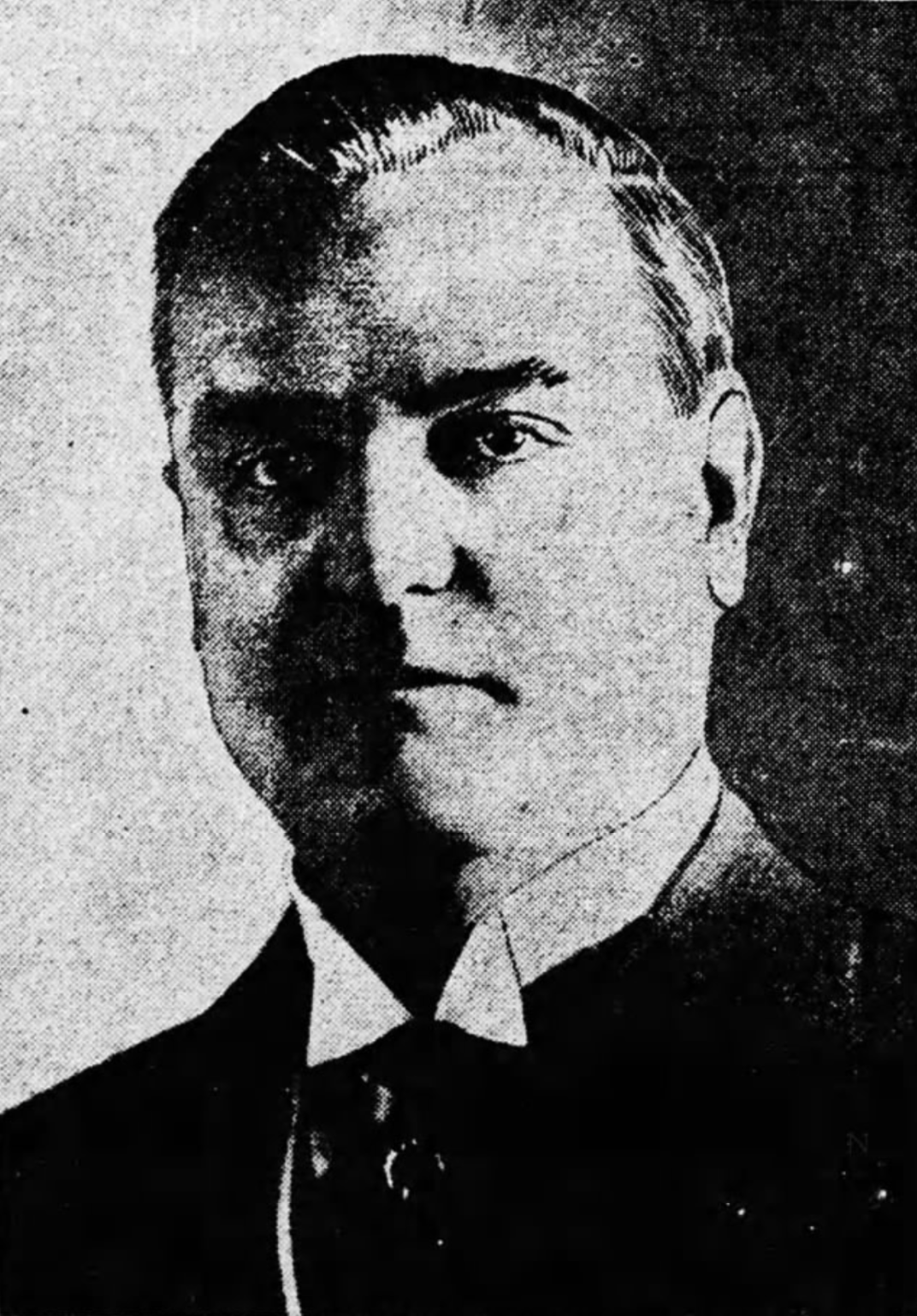
- Manning, c. 1915

2nd Director of the U.S. Bureau of Mines
- In office 1915–1920
- Preceded by: Joseph Austin Holmes
- Succeeded by: Frederick Gardner Cottrell

Personal details
- Born: Vannoy Hartrog Manning; December 15, 1861 Horn Lake, Mississippi, U.S.
- Died: July 13, 1932 (aged 70) Forest Hills, Queens, New York City, New York, U.S.
- Resting place: Oak Hill Cemetery, Washington, D.C., U.S.
- Spouse: Emily S. Stevens (m. 1898)
- Children: 2
- Parent: Van H. Manning (father)
- Relatives: Levi Manning (brother)
- Education: University of Mississippi

Vannoy Hartrog Manning (December 15, 1861 – July 13, 1932), better known as Van H. Manning, was the second director of the U.S. Bureau of Mines and was instrumental in developing chemical warfare defense technologies during World War I.

== Early life ==
Vannoy Hartrog Manning was born on December 15, 1861, in Horn Lake, Mississippi, to Mary Zilafro (née Wallace) and Vannoy Hartrog Manning, a Mississippi congressman. He attended school in Holly Springs, Mississippi. He attended University of Mississippi for three years, before moving back to Holly Springs to teach school. Other sources suggest he graduated with an engineering degree from the University of Mississippi in 1881. Afterward, he moved to Washington, D.C.

== Career ==
In 1885 or 1886, Manning joined the U.S. Geological Survey as a civil engineer and worked two years in Massachusetts. From 1888 to 1894, Manning led topographic field parties in Wisconsin and North Dakota. He then worked as assistant to the supervisor of the survey of Indian Territory. In 1904, he became section chief in charge of the survey in Missouri and Arkansas. In 1906, he was placed in charge of the southern section of the eastern division. In 1908, Manning led drainage work on the Tallahatchie River in Mississippi. From 1907 to 1910, he served on the Geological Survey Business Committee. In 1910, Manning was transferred to the newly formed U.S. Bureau of Mines; starting as chief clerk. His role was later renamed assistant to the director. Following the death of the first director Joseph Austin Holmes, Vanning became director in 1915 and served in that role until he resigned in May 1920.

Manning worked with the War Department starting in 1916 with nitrogen products. In 1917, they started performing experiments with helium to reduce its price by large margins and save the military millions of dollars. Under his purview, the Bureau started the War Gas Investigations Branch to research toxic gas as an instrument of war and to develop a chemical warfare defense. He established chemical laboratories at American University, which would later be used by the Chemical Warfare Service in World War I. Manning argued that chemical production and research should remain under civilian control and not military, but President Wilson transferred 1,700 American chemists to the Chemical Warfare Service in June 1918.

Following the war in 1920, Manning resigned his position as director of the Bureau of Mines to become director of research for the American Petroleum Institute in 1920. He held that role until 1924 when he became a consulting engineer with the Pan-American Petroleum & Transport Company for the Bureau of Mines. In 1928, Manning became director of engineering and technical research for the Petroleum Research Corporation. Following the 1929 Wall Street Crash and ill health, Manning resigned from his position in 1930.

== Personal life ==
Mrs. Manning and mine rescue methods, c. 1917

Manning married Emily S. Stephens of Washington, D.C., in 1898 in Denison, Texas. Together, they had two sons: Van H. Manning Jr. and Oscar Stevens Manning.

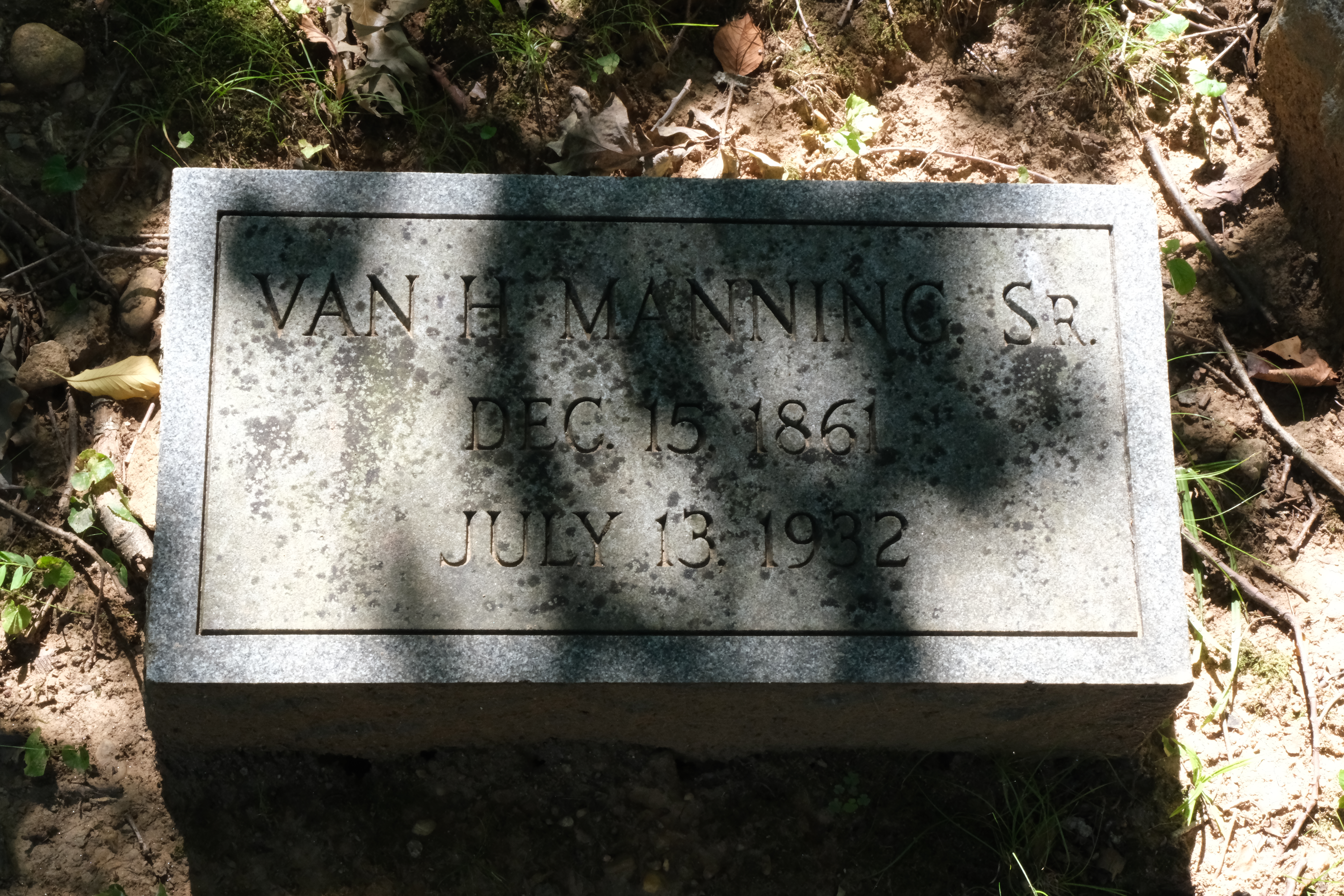
Grave of Manning at Oak Hill Cemetery

Manning died on July 13, 1932, at his home in Forest Hills, Queens, New York City. He was interred at Oak Hill Cemetery in Washington, D.C.

== Awards ==
Manning was given an honorary Doctor of Engineering degree by the University of Pittsburgh in 1919.
