= Gene C. Reid Park =

Urban park in Tucson, Arizona

- Randolph Park
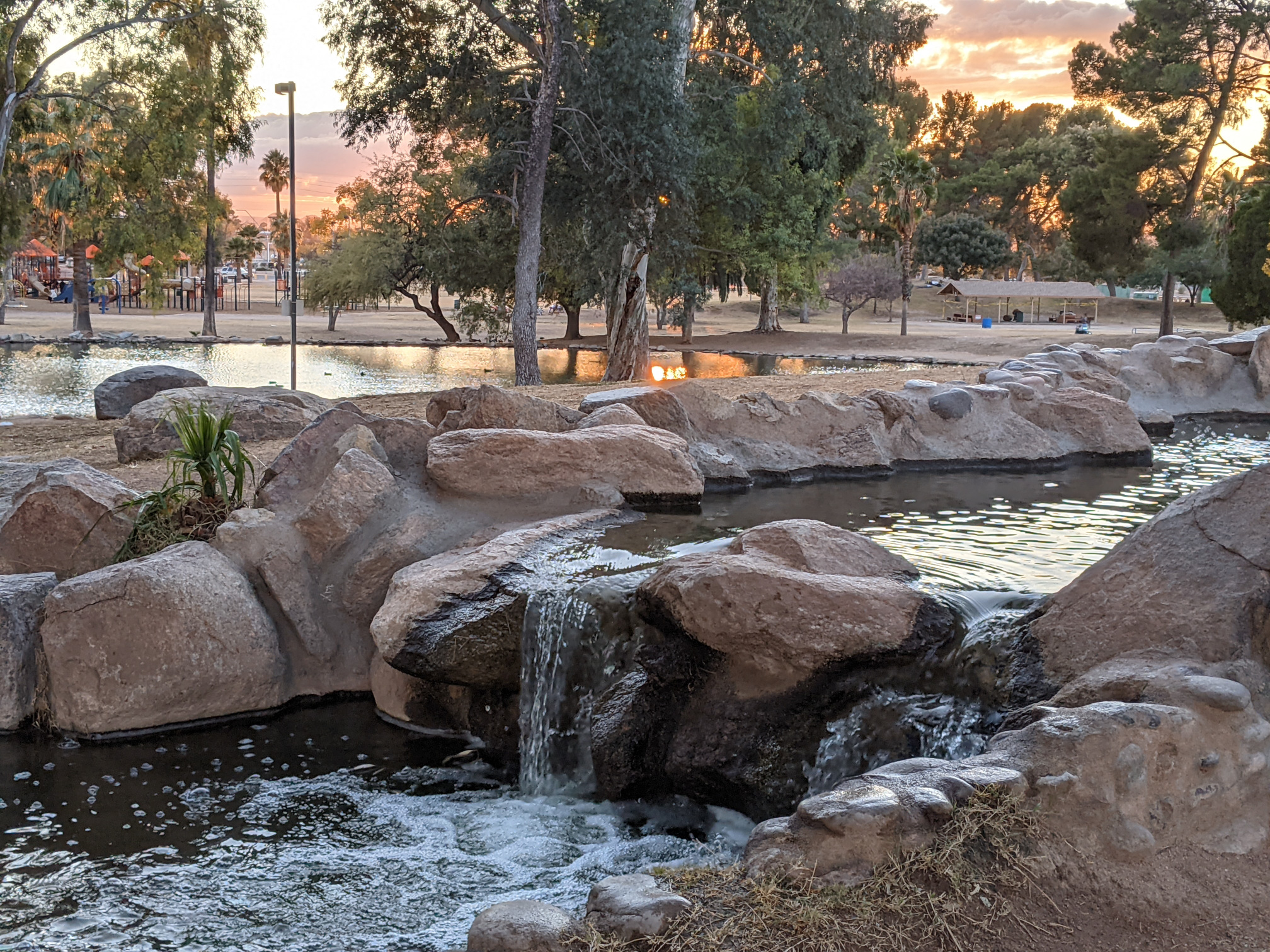
- Sunset behind Barnum Hill and the south pond
- Interactive map of Gene C. Reid Park
- Type: Urban park
- Location: Tucson, Arizona, United States
- Coordinates: 32°12′38″N 110°55′19″W
- Area: 131 acres (53 ha)
- Created: 1925
- Operator: Tucson Parks and Recreation

Gene C. Reid Park is a 131-acre urban park in central Tucson, Arizona that includes a 9,500-seat baseball stadium, an outdoor performance center, two man-made ponds, public pools, and a 24-acre zoo along with playgrounds, gardens and picnic areas. The park occupies the western third of a 480-acre parks and recreation complex established in 1925 as Randolph Park which additionally includes two 18-hole golf courses, a tennis and racquetball facility, and an indoor recreation center. A 2-mile loop of paved multi-use trails follows the edge of the park, connecting with another 2.5 miles around the Randolph golf and recreation centers.

== History ==
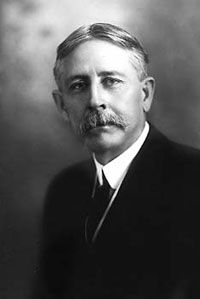
Epes Randolph

In 1925, the City of Tucson obtained a 480-acre parcel of land from the State of Arizona to create a park and golf course. The land was either purchased directly by the city fathers or was bought by Willis E. and Laura Barnum and turned over to city officials. The L-shaped park, which is one mile in width and length with a half-mile-square neighborhood in its northwest corner, was named for prominent railroad executive and Tucson citizen Epes Randolph, who died in 1921.

In 1978 the western third of Randolph Park was renamed for the City of Tucson’s first parks director, Gene C. Reid, upon his retirement. In over thirty years as director Reid expanded Tucson's park system from 8 to 84 parks and made significant additions to Randolph. Reid oversaw the addition of the DeMeester Outdoor Performance Center, the zoo, the expansion and renovation of Randolf Golf Course, and the excavation of two lakes which doubled as irrigation reservoirs. The zoo and lakes also bear Reid's name. The recreation center and golf complex remain named after Randolph.

== Sports and performance venues ==
=== Hi Corbett Field ===
Randolph Municipal Baseball Park opened in 1928 near Randolph Park's center. A baseball stadium constructed at the site in 1937 was later named for Hiram Corbett, who worked with Cleveland Indians owner Bill Veeck to bring the Indians to Tucson for spring training. The Indians used Hi Corbett Field from 1945 until 1992. From 1969 until 1997, the stadium was also used by the Tucson Cowboys & Triple-A Tucson Toros. In 1993 the expansion Colorado Rockies began using the stadium for spring training, staying through 2010. The stadium became home to the University of Arizona Wildcats in 2012. In their first season at Hi Corbett, the Wildcats won the 2012 College World Series.

=== DeMeester Outdoor Performance Center ===
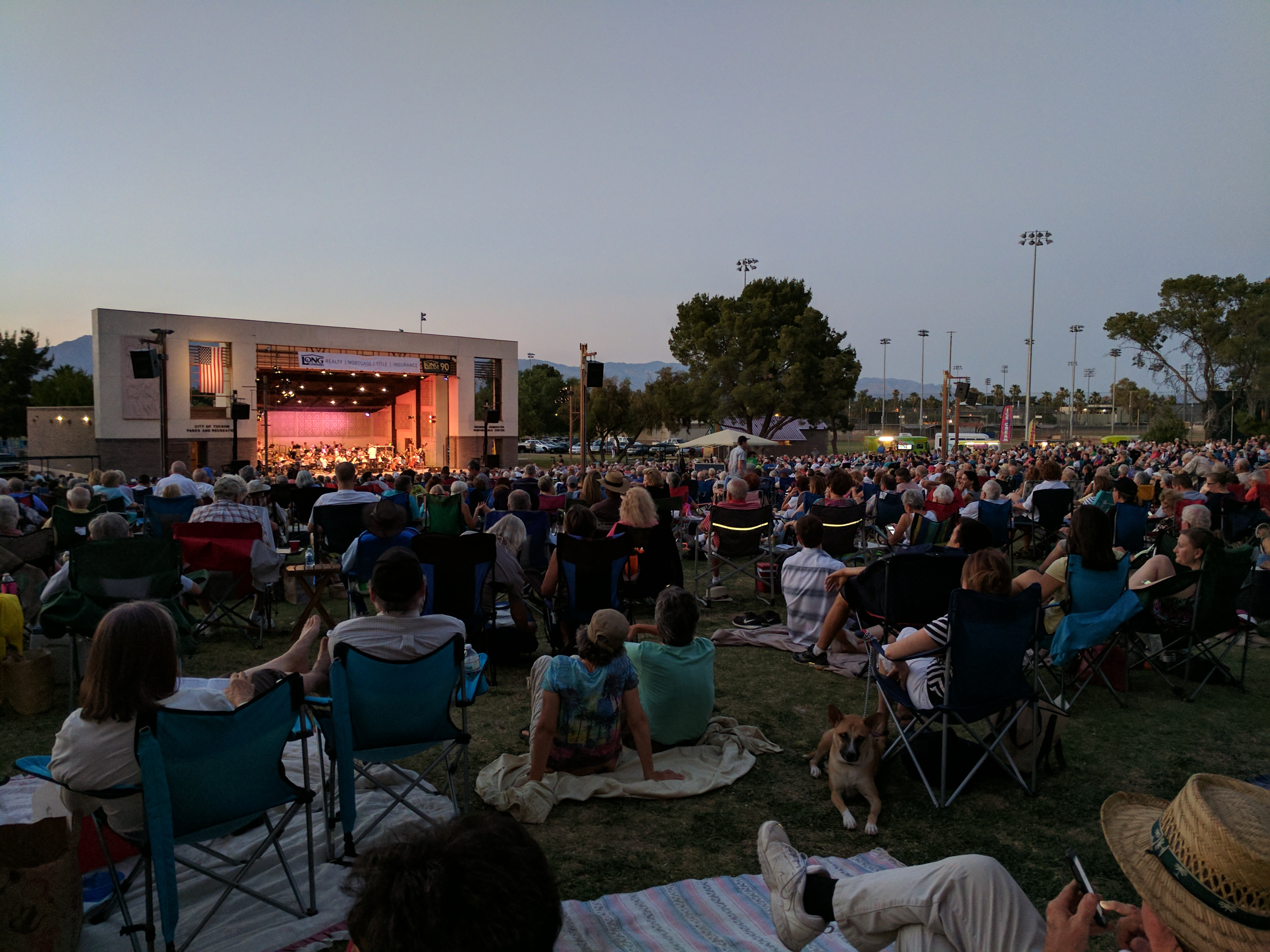
Music Under the Stars at DeMeester Center in 2017

Located on the park's west side, the DeMeester Outdoor Performance Center or OPC is a large grass amphitheater around a covered stage with integrated lighting and sound. Host to open-air concerts, festivals, theater productions, and movie screenings, its official capacity is 7,000.

Reid constructed a bandshell at the site in 1964 to give conductor Georges DeMeester's "Pops" orchestra a permanent home, using surplus corrugated steel from Davis Monthan Air Force Base. The amphitheater was created using dirt from University of Arizona basement excavations. In 1974 the City replaced the original bandshell with the current stage. The performance center was named for DeMeester in 1987. In 1997, the street leading to it was named for Charles "Bucky" Steele, who conducted the Pops Orchestra for nearly twenty-five years after DeMeester's retirement. The Tucson Pops Music Under the Stars concert series continues to be held at DeMeester Center each spring.

A cast-concrete sculpture panel entitled "Celebrate The Arts" was added to the stage enclosure in 1986. The 8'-by-16' panel by Carole Hanson and Guillermo Esparza depicts six performers: a dancer, an actor with a comedy mask, an actor with a tragedy mask, a singer, a guitarist, and a wind musician. Catalogued in the Smithsonian Art Inventory, the work was the first Percent for the Arts commission in the City of Tucson.

== Attractions ==
=== Reid Park Zoo ===
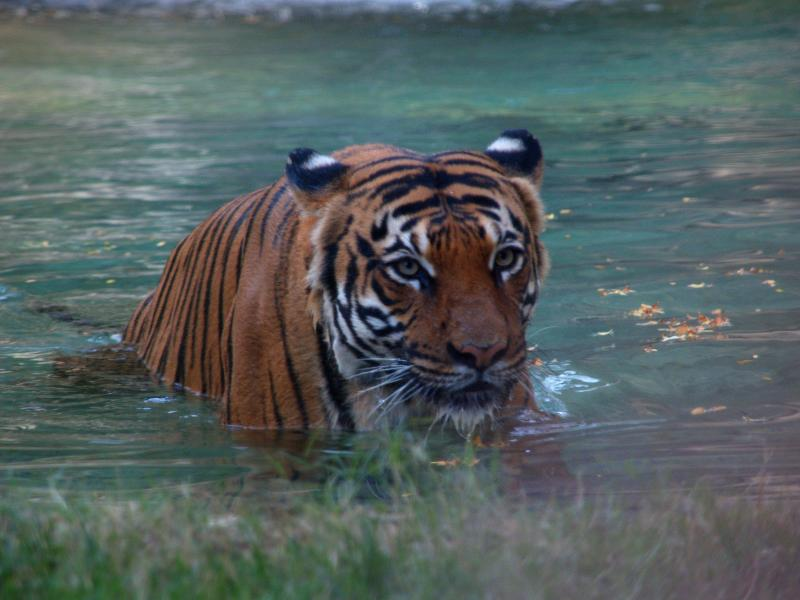
A Malayan Tiger at Reid Park Zoo

Founded in 1965 with the donation of a pair of peacocks, Reid Park Zoo has grown into a 24-acre city-owned non-profit zoo accredited by the Association of Zoos and Aquariums. Located in the southeast corner of the park, it features more than 100 species and 500 animals. The zoo most recently expanded in 2012 with the addition of a 7-acre African elephant exhibit. Its breeding herd, on loan from the San Diego Zoo Safari Park, includes the first African elephant born in the state of Arizona.

=== Cele Peterson Rose Garden ===
The Reid Park Rose Garden, created in 1960, exhibits more than 100 cultivars of rose and 800 individual plants. Planting beds radiate out from a large gazebo at the garden's center. In 2019 the garden was named for Tucson business owner and philanthropist Cele Peterson.

=== Miko's Corner Playground Dog Park ===
Named after a Tucson Police Department police dog that lost its life in the line of duty, Miko's Corner Playground is a lighted, two-acre, off-leash dog park with separate areas for large and small dogs.

=== Reid Park Ponds and Barnum Hill ===
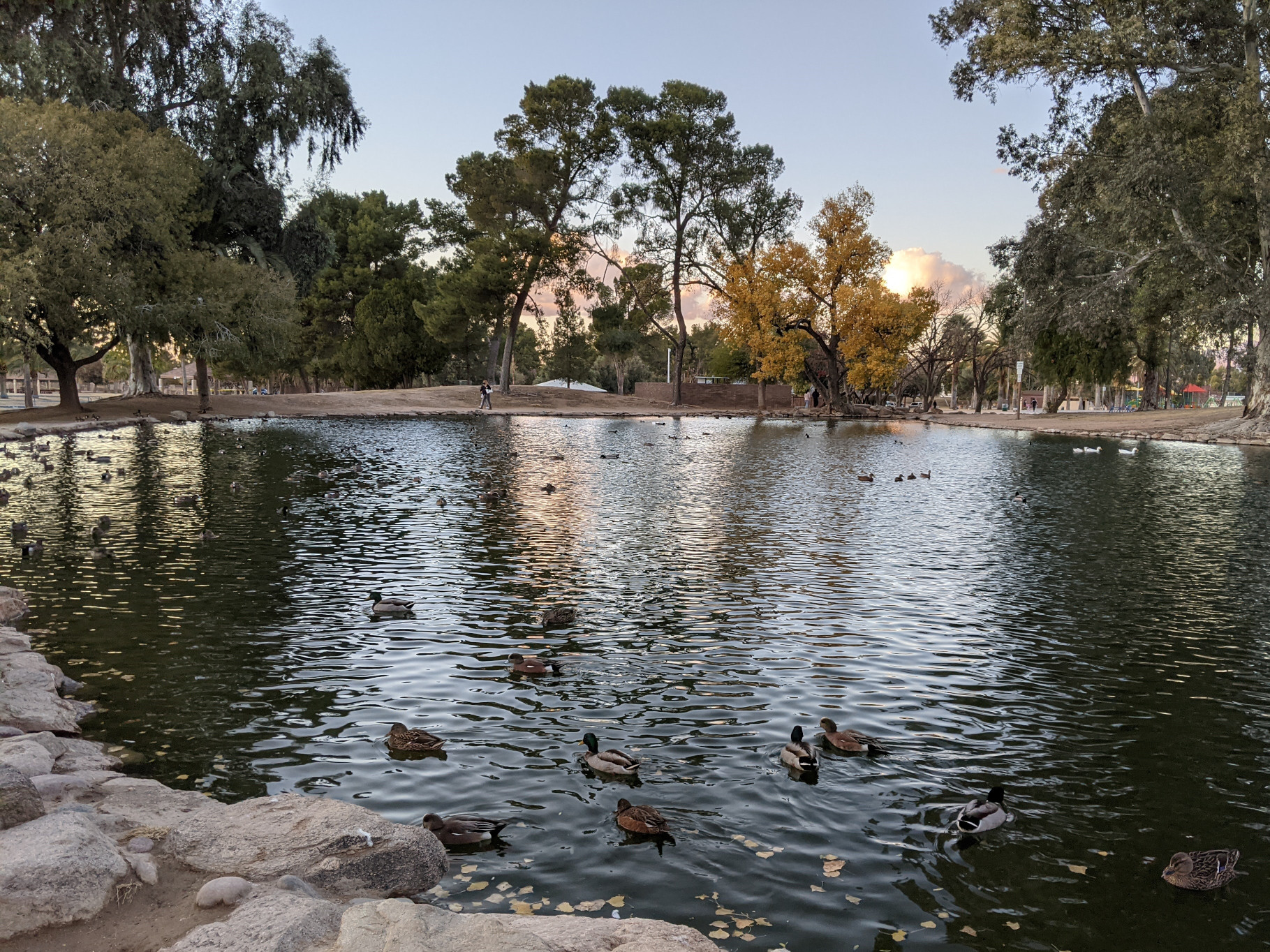
Reid Park's South Pond

The park features two man-made ponds, home to a variety of bird species. The north pond, the larger of the two with an area of 2.2 acres, was used for paddle-boating until 1998, when both ponds were dredged and island features were removed. Water pumped to the top of a hill between the lakes feeds two man-made streams: one returns to the north pond via a series of waterfalls; the other winds its way down to the south pond before continuing on to the north. In 1993 the hill was named for Willis E. Barnum Sr., a civic leader who was connected with the park.

== Sports and recreation facilities ==
=== Edith Ball Adaptive Recreation Center ===
The Adaptive Recreation Center has two swimming pools. One is a shaded outdoor recreation pool used for fitness classes, lap swim, and open swim. The pool includes a walking channel, play features, and a zero-depth entry. The other is an indoor warm-water therapy pool.

=== Emil Bossard Annex Fields ===
Also called the Reid Park Annex, the Emil Bossard Annex Fields are named after a longtime groundskeeper for the Cleveland Indians who retired to Tucson to become groundskeeper for Hi Corbett and the Annex.

=== Horseshoe Pits ===
The park's twelve horseshoe pits, home to the Tucson Horseshoe Pitchers' Club, are located on Lakeshore Way at 22nd Street, just south of the zoo.

== Randolph Park ==
Although the recreation center, tennis center, and golf complex are not officially part of Reid Park, the full complex of facilities located on what was originally Randolph Park is often referred to as a whole using either the Reid or Randolph name.

=== Randolph Golf Complex ===
The first golf course in Randolph Park was built in 1925. Now administered by Tucson City Golf, Randolph has two 18-hole golf courses, a driving range, a pro shop, and a clubhouse. In 1996 what until that time was known as Randolph South was rebuilt and named Dell Urich Golf Course.

=== Randolph Recreation Center ===
Randolph Recreation Center is located on the west side of Alvernon centered between Broadway and 22nd Street. The facility is equipped with a skate park, a pool, courts configurable for either basketball or volleyball, a weight room, an auditorium, and dedicated classrooms for aerobics, dance, gymnastics, pottery, jewelry-making, and photography.

=== Jim Reffkin Tennis Center ===
The Jim Reffkin Tennis Center, located in the northeast corner of the original Randolph Park, has 25 lighted tennis courts, 10 lighted racquetball Courts, and a pro shop. It was honored as the "Outstanding Facility of the Year" in 1993 by the United States Tennis Association.
