= William H. Tebbs =

American politician

Dr. William Henry Tebbs (November 16, 1821 – November 10, 1866) was an American politician. He also served as an officer of the Confederate States Army during the American Civil War from 1861 to 1863.

== Early life and education ==
Tebbs was born in Prince William County, Virginia, and upon reaching adulthood began studying medicine. He began practicing as a doctor, and later moved to Mason County, Kentucky, where he married Martha Anderson. The couple moved to Platte County, Missouri, where he again opened a private doctor practice. In 1854, he and his brother Obidiah opened a hotel in Jefferson County, Kansas, in the rapidly expanding town of Ozawkie.

Tebbs entered into politics, serving on the territorial Legislature, and initially was successful in having the town of Ozawkie named as the county seat. However, not long afterward the decision was made to name Oskaloosa as the county seat. Tebbs became a member of the Democratic Party, and an active member of the pro-slavery movement. Following the Kansas free-state victory in 1857, he and his family moved to Hamburg, Arkansas, where he again opened a medical practice.

== American Civil War ==
In May 1861, following the outbreak of the American Civil War, he joined with Van. H. Manning in the recruitment and organization of the 3d Arkansas Infantry Regiment, in which Tebbs was initially elected a captain. His brother Obidiah also joined the regiment, assigned to "A" Company, which was commanded by Tebbs. The regiment was then marched to Vicksburg, Mississippi and presented for service in the Confederate Army. Initially, they were turned down. However, Manning appealed to Arkansas politician Albert Rust, whose two brothers were serving in the regiment, and with persistence the Third Arkansas became a part of the Confederate Army, being sent to Lynchburg, Virginia for training.

The regiment was then assigned to General Robert E. Lee's Army of Northern Virginia, and soon after attached to the Texas Brigade. Tebbs was promoted to lieutenant-colonel following Manning's promotion to colonel in early 1862. He would serve with the regiment in the battles of Cheat Mountain, Seven Pines, Harpers Ferry, Antietam, and Fredericksburg, in addition to several smaller battles and skirmishes in between. In bad health, Tebbs would resign his commission and leave Confederate service on January 11, 1863.

== Death ==
He died in November, 1866, in St. Louis, Missouri, and was buried in "Bellefontaine Cemetery".

== Sources ==
- Third Arkansas Infantry Regiment, CSA at Edward G. Gerdes Civil War Home Page (couchgenweb.com)
