= Reginald Tebbs =

English cricketer

Personal information
- Full name: Reginald Kearsley Tebbs
- Born: 8 May 1908; Leeds, Yorkshire, England
- Died: 31 January 1973 (aged 64); Athens, Greece
- Batting: Unknown
- Bowling: Left-arm medium-fast

Domestic team information
- Years: Team
- 1946: Berkshire
- 1929: Cambridge University

Career statistics
Competition	First-class
Matches	1
Runs scored	0
Batting average	0.00
100s/50s	–/–
Top score	0
Balls bowled	150
Wickets	1
Bowling average	87.00
5 wickets in innings	–
10 wickets in match	–
Best bowling	1/70
Catches/stumpings	1/–
- Source: Cricinfo, 26 November 2011

Reginald Kearsley Tebbs (8 May 1908 – 31 January 1973) was an English cricketer. Tebbs' batting style is unknown, though it is known he bowled left-arm medium-fast. He was born at Leeds, Yorkshire.

While studying at the University of Cambridge in 1929, Tebbs made a single first-class appearance for Cambridge University Cricket Club against Glamorgan at Fenner's, Cambridge. During this match, he was dismissed for a duck in Cambridge University's first-innings by Jack Mercer. In Glamorgan's first-innings he took the wicket of William Bates, finishing with figures of 1/70. He wasn't required to bat in the university's second-innings, with the match ending in a draw. This was his only first-class appearance for the university.

Following World War II, Tebbs made four appearances for Berkshire in the 1946 Minor Counties Championship. He appeared twice against Suffolk and once against Buckinghamshire and Dorset. He died at Athens, Greece on 31 January 1973.
