= Frank H. Hereford =

American Old West lawyer, district attorney

- Born: November 21, 1861; Sacramento, California
- Education: University of the Pacific
- Occupations: Attorney, politician

Frank H. Hereford was an attorney and member of the Arizona constitutional convention. He also had interests in mining ventures.

== Early life ==
Hereford was born Sacramento, California, on November 21, 1861. He was the son of Benjamin H. and Mary (Jewell) Hereford, who were natives of Virginia. His parents both emigrated from Virginia with their parents when they were children and met and married in California. Their son attended public schools and later McClure's Academy in California, Santa Clara College, and finished his education at the University of the Pacific in San Jose.

== Practices law ==
In 1877 he moved to Tucson, Arizona Territory, and began to study law. Only a year later he got a job with Lord and Williams, a retail company, where he worked for two years. From there he went to Tombstone and became general agent for a stage company, J.D. Kiner and Company, through 1882. He then relocated to Prescott, the capital of the Arizona Territory, where he became the private secretary of Governor Tritle for the next two years. He spent considerable time giving attention to mining matters that Governor Tritle was interested in.

He followed this with a few months traveling in Old Mexico and to the east coast of the United States. He then became Deputy County Clerk of Pima County for a year. He renewed his law studies and was admitted to the bar on July 8, 1886 and formed a partnership with T.S. Stiles, who was later elected to the Washington state Supreme Court.

== Becomes district attorney ==
He then practiced law with his father until his father died in 1890. He was a deputy district attorney during his father's term and on July 7, 1890, he was appointed to succeed his father as district attorney. When his term expired, he resumed his law practice.

On May 12, 1891 he was elected a delegate to the Arizona constitutional convention. On the November 8, 1892, he was elected Pima County District Attorney. When this office ended, he returned to private practice. He was later private counsel for Southern Pacific Railroad. He also represented the San Pedro Cattle Company, the San Simon Cattle Company, the Canada Del Oro Mines Ltd. of London; Tucson Mining and Smelting and numerous other corporations. He maintained an interest in mining and was a director of the Consolidated National Bank of Tucson.
