= List of Tau Beta Pi members =

Tau Beta Pi is an American honor society for engineering. It was formed at Lehigh University in June 1885. Following are some of Tau Beta Pi's notable members.

== Academia ==
=== Presidents and chancellors ===
Name	Chapters and dates	Notability	Ref.
Arthur S. Adams	Colorado Alpha, 1918	president of the University of New Hampshire	
Robert Altenkirch	Pennsylvania Theta, 1973	president of University of Alabama in Huntsville and the New Jersey Institute of Technology	
George S. Ansell	New York Gamma, 1954	president of the Colorado School of Mines and senior chief executive in the Colorado higher education system	
Bill L. Atchley	Missouri Beta, 1957	president of Clemson University and the University of the Pacific	
David H. Auston	New Jersey Alpha, 1962	president of Case Western Reserve University	
Manuel Ayau	Louisiana Alpha	founder and first rector of the Universidad Francisco Marroquín	
Brown Ayres	New Jersey Alpha, 1878	president of the University of Tennessee	
Merl Baker	Kentucky Alpha, 1945	president of the University of Missouri-Rolla	
Thomas Baker	Pennsylvania Gamma, 1891	second president of Carnegie Mellon University	
Warren J. Baker	Michigan Delta, 1960	president of California Polytechnic State University, San Luis Obispo	
Harry Yandell Benedict	Texas Alpha, 1892	president of the University of Texas at Austin	
Amine Bensaid	Florida Gamma	president of Al Akhawayn University	
Daniel Berg	New York Gamma, 1950	president of Rensselaer Polytechnic Institute	
Charles R. Bergmann	New Jersey Gamma, 1935	president of the New Jersey Institute of Technology	
Theodore A. Bickart	Maryland Alpha, 1957	president of the Colorado School of Mines	
Harold S. Boardman	Maine Alpha, 1895	president of the University of Maine	
Frank C. Bolton	Texas Delta, 1905	president of Texas A&M University	
Carl W. Borgmann	Colorado Beta, 1927	president of the University of Vermont	
Ray M. Bowen	Texas Delta, 1958	president of Texas A&M University and president of Oklahoma State University	
Daniel J. Bradley	Oklahoma Beta, 1983	president of Indiana State University and Fairmont State University	
John C. Bravman	California Gamma, 1979	president of Bucknell University	
William R. Brody	Massachusetts Beta, 1965	president of the Johns Hopkins University	
Arthur Bronwell	Illinois Gamma, 1933	president of the Worcester Polytechnic Institute	
John Lott Brown	Florida Gamma, 1945	president of the University of South Florida	
Jesse E. Buchanan	Washington Beta, 1927	president of the University of Idaho	
George Bugliarello	New York Rho, 1951	chancellor of the Polytechnic Institute of NYU	
Marion LeRoy Burton	Michigan Gamma, 1900	president of Smith College, the University of Minnesota, and the University of Michigan	
John F. Carney	Connecticut Beta, 1963	chancellor of Missouri University of Science and Technology	
Anthony Catanese	Michigan Epsilon, 1963	president of the Florida Institute of Technology and Florida Atlantic University	
A. Ramond Chamberlain	Michigan Alpha, 1951	president of Colorado State University	
Jean-Lou Chameau	Georgia Alpha, 1977	president of King Abdullah University of Science and Technology and the California Institute of Technology	
David C. Chang	California Alpha, 1956	president of the Polytechnic Institute of NYU	
G. Wayne Clough	Virginia Beta, 1964	president emeritus of Georgia Tech	
Jared Cohon	Maryland Alpha, 1969	president of Carnegie Mellon University	
Karl Taylor Compton	Massachusetts Beta, 1908	president of the Massachusetts Institute of Technology	
Dale R. Corson	New York Delta, 1934	president of Cornell University	
William B. Cottingham	Indiana Alpha, 1955	president of Kettering University	
Edmund Cranch	New Jersey Gamma, 1944	president of Worcester Polytechnic Institute	
John Patrick Crecine	Pennsylvania Gamma, 1961	president of Georgia Tech	
Allan Cullimore	New Jersey Gamma, 1907	president of New Jersey Institute of Technology	
David E. Daniel	Texas Alpha, 1972	president of the University of Texas at Dallas and deputy chancellor of the University of Texas System	
Harvey N. Davis	Massachusetts Gamma, 1901	president of Stevens Institute of Technology	
Jess H. Davis	Ohio Gamma, 1928	president of Stevens Institute of Technology	
Beaumont Davison	Tennessee Beta, 1950	president of Tri-State University	
Thomas B. Day	California Xi, 1952	president of San Diego State University	
Fred W. DeMoney	Illinois Beta, 1941	president of Montana Technological University	
Denice Denton	Washington Alpha, 1982	chancellor of the University of California, Santa Cruz	
Grover C. Dillman	Michigan Alpha, 1913	president of the Michigan College of Mining and Technology	
Robert E. Doherty	Illinois Alpha, 1909	president of Carnegie Mellon University	
Henry Sturgis Drinker	Pennsylvania Alpha, 1871	president of Lehigh University	
Thomas Messinger Drow	Pennsylvania Alpha, 1859	president of Lehigh University	
Lee Alvin DuBridge	California Beta, 1922	president of the California Institute of Technology	
James Duderstadt	Connecticut Alpha, 1964	president of the University of Michigan	
Gano Dunn	New York Alpha, 1891	president of Cooper Union	
G. Brooks Earnest	Ohio Alpha, 1927	president of Fenn College	
Carl Ell	Massachusetts Epsilon, 1911	president of Northeastern University	
Thomas Eugene Everhart	Illinois Alpha, 1953	chancellor of the University of Illinois, Urbana-Champaign and president of the California Institute of Technology	
Livingston Farrand	Colorado Beta, 1888	president of Cornell University and the University of Colorado Boulder	
Gregory C. Farrington	Pennsylvania Delta, 1968	president of Lehigh University and executive director of the California Academy of Sciences	
Saul Fenster	New Jersey Gamma, 1953	president of New Jersey Institute of Technology	
Gregory L. Fenves	New York Delta, 1979	president of Emory University and the University of Texas at Austin	
Raymond L. Fitz	Ohio Theta, 1964	president of the University of Dayton	
James C. Fletcher	Utah Alpha, 1940	Administrator of NASA and president of the University of Utah	
James D. Foley	Pennsylvania Alpha	professor of telecommunications at Georgia Tech	
Richard G. Folsom	California Beta, 1928	president of Rensselaer Polytechnic Institute	
C. Clement French	Pennsylvania Delta, 1922	president of Washington State University	
Robert R. Furgason	Idaho Alpha, 1956	president of Texas A&M University–Corpus Christi	
Clifford Furnas	Indiana Alpha, 1922	first president of the University at Buffalo and Assistant Secretary of Defense for Research and Engineering	
Richard H. Gallagher	Arizona Alpha, 1950	president of Clarkson University	
John Gallalee	Virginia Alpha, 1911	president of the University of Alabama	
William S. Gaither	Pennsylvania Zeta, 1956	president of Drexel University	
Alice Gast	California Delta, 1980	president of Imperial College London	
Gibb Gilchrist	Texas Delta, 1909	president of Texas A&M University	
Robert C. Gillespie	West Virginia Beta, 1964	president of the West Virginia Institute of Technology	
Marvin Leonard Goldberger	Pennsylvania Gamma, 1943	president of the California Institute of Technology	
Brage Golding	Indiana Alpha, 1941	president of Wright State University, California State University, San Diego State University, and Kent State University	
Richard J. Gowen	New Jersey Beta, 1957	president of Dakota State College and the South Dakota School of Mines and Technology	
John W. Graham Jr.	Ohio Gamma, 1939	president of Clarkson College of Technology	
Paul E. Gray	Massachusetts Beta, 1954	president of the Massachusetts Institute of Technology	
Harvey H. Grice	Ohio Gamma, 1937	president of Graceland College	
Richard J. Grosh	Indiana Alpha, 1950	president of Rensselaer Polytechnic Institute	
Les Guice	Louisiana Gamma, 1978	president of Louisiana Tech University	
William W. Hagerty	Delaware Alpha, 1939	president of Drexel University	
Jim Halligan	Iowa Alpha, 1962	president of New Mexico State University and Oklahoma State University and Oklahoma Senate	
Arthur G. Hansen	Indiana Alpha, 1947	president of Purdue University and chancellor of the Texas A&M University System	
Patrick T. Harker	Pennsylvania Delta, 1981	president of University of Delaware, dean of the Wharton School, and president of the Federal Reserve Bank of Philadelphia	
John W. Harrelson	North Carolina Alpha, 1909	first chancellor of North Carolina State University	
Marion T. Harrington	Texas Delta, 1922	president of Georgia Tech	
Edwin D. Harrison	Virginia Beta, 1948	president of Georgia Tech	
William Hazell	New Jersey Gamma, 1930	president of the Newark College of Engineering	
George W. Hazzard	Massachusetts Alpha, 1936	president of Worcester Polytechnic Institute	
Henry Townley Heald	Washington Beta, 1923	first president of Illinois Institute of Technology and the Ford Foundation	
Joseph J. Helble	Pennsylvania Alpha, 1982	president of Lehigh University	
John L. Hennessy	Pennsylvania Theta, 1973	president of Stanford University and chairman of Alphabet Inc.	
Richard Herman	New Jersey Alpha, 1963	chancellor of the University of Illinois at Urbana-Champaign	
Ira Nelson Hollis	Massachusetts Alpha,1899	president of Worcester Polytechnic Institute	
William O. Hotchkiss	Wisconsin Alpha, 1903	president of Michigan Technological University and Rensselaer Polytechnic Institute	
Livingston W. Houston	New York Gamma, 1913	president of Rensselaer Polytechnic Institute	
William V. Houston	California Beta, 1920	president of Rice University	
Frederick L. Hovde	Minnesota Alpha, 1929	president of Purdue University	
Charles S. Howe	Ohio Alpha, 1878	president of Case School of Applied Science	
Eugene J. Howell	Texas Delta, 1922	president of Tarleton State University	
Samuel Hulbert	Louisiana Beta, 1958	president of Rose-Hulman Institute of Technology	
Charles E. Hummel	Connecticut Alpha, 1943	president of Barrington College	
Alexander Crombie Humphreys	New Jersey Alpha, 1881	president of the Stevens Institute of Technology	
J. Charles Jennett	South Carolina Alpha, 1963	president of Texas A&M International University	
Martin C. Jischke	Iowa Alpha, 1963	president of Purdue University	
James E. A. John	Maryland Beta, 1955	president of Kettering University	
Kristina M. Johnson	North Carolina Gamma, 1981	chancellor of the State University of New York and president of Ohio State University	
Fayette A. Jones	Missouri Beta,1892	president of the New Mexico School of Mines	
Russel C. Jones	Pennsylvania Gamma, 1957	president of the University of Delaware	
Thomas F. Jones	Mississippi Alpha, 1939	president of the University of South Carolina	
Vikram Kapoor	Ohio Zeta, 1966	president of the University of Toledo	
Robert L. Ketter	Missouri Alpha, 1950	president of the University at Buffalo	
James Rhyne Killian	Massachusetts Beta, 1926	president of the Massachusetts Institute of Technology	
Edward T. Kirkpatrick	New York Kappa, 1947	president of Wentworth Institute of Technology	
Maria Klawe	California Omega, 1973	president of Harvey Mudd College	
John A. Klekotka	Pennsylvania Theta, 1935	president of Villanova University	
Asa S. Knowles	Ohio Zeta, 1928	president of the University of Toledo and Northeastern University	
Bill N. Lacy	New York Iota, 1955	president of the Cooper Union for the Advancement of Science and Art and the State University of New York at Purchase	
Laurence H. Lattman	Utah Alpha, 1948	president of the New Mexico Institute of Mining and Technology	
Tod A. Laursen	Oregon Alpha, 1986	chancellor of American University of Sharjah	
Deming Lewis	Pennsylvania Alpha, 1935	president of Lehigh University	
Peter Likins	California Gamma, 1957	president of Lehigh University and the University of Arizona	
John A. Logan	Illinois Gamma, 1929	president of Rose–Hulman Institute of Technology	
John Henry MacCracken	Pennsylvania Epsilon, 1894	president of Westminster College and Lafayette College	
John Marburger	New York Omicron, 1962	president of Stony Brook University and director of Brookhaven National Laboratory	
Joseph M. Marchello	Maryland Beta, 1955	president of Old Dominion University	
Thomas Lyle Martin Jr.	Arizona Alpha, 1942	president of the Illinois Institute of Technology	
Fujio Matsuda	Indiana Beta, 1949	president of the University of Hawaiʻi at Mānoa	
Gerald W. May	Illinois Delta, 1962	president of the University of New Mexico	
Guy T. McBride	Texas Alpha, 1940	president of the Colorado School of Mines	
T. Dwayne McCay	Alpha Alpha, 1968	president and CEO of the Florida Institute of Technology	
Charles J. Merdinger	New York Gamma, 1945	president of Washington College	
Carolyn Meyers	North Carolina Epsilon, 1963	president of Jackson State University and Norfolk State University	
Richard Miller	California Lambda, 1971	founding president of Olin College	
William F. Miller	California Alpha, 1949	professor emeritus, president, and provost of Stanford University; president and CEO of SRI International	
Larry K. Monteith	North Carolina Alpha, 1960	chancellor of North Carolina State University	
John H. Moore	Michigan Gamma, 1958	president of Grove City College and deputy director of the National Science Foundation	
C. Daniel Mote Jr.	California Alpha, 1959	president emeritus of the National Academy of Engineering and president of the University of Maryland, College Park	
Wendell Nedderman	Texas Delta, 1943	president of the University of Texas at Arlington	
John Lloyd Newcomb	Virginia Alpha, 1903	president of the University of Virginia	
Constantine Papadakis	Michigan Gamma, 1973	president of Drexel University	
Edward A. Parrish	Virginia Alpha, 1964	president of Worcester Polytechnic Institute	
Fay L. Partlo	Michigan Beta, 1923	president of South Dakota School of Mines & Technology	
Maryly Van Leer Peck	Tennessee Beta	president of Polk Community College	
G. P. "Bud" Peterson	Kansas Gamma, 1975	president of Georgia Tech	
Joseph M. Pettit	California Alpha, 1937	president of Georgia Tech	
Percy A. Pierre	District of Columbia Alpha, 1961	president of Prairie View A&M University	
R. Byron Pipes	Pennsylvania Zeta, 1964	president of Rensselaer Polytechnic Institute	
Karl S. Pister	California Alpha, 1945	chancellor at the University of California, Santa Cruz	
Kenneth Pitzer	California Beta, 1935	president of Rice University and Stanford University	
David V. Ragone	Massachusetts Beta, 1951	president of Case Western Reserve University	
Roland C. Rautenstraus	Colorado Beta, 1946	president of the University of Colorado Boulder	
L. Rafael Reif		president of the Massachusetts Institute of Technology	
Dan Reneau	Louisiana Gamma, 1963	president of Louisiana Tech University	
John Rettaliata	Illinois Beta, 1932	president of Illinois Institute of Technology	
Charles R. Richards	Indiana Alpha, 1890	president of Lehigh University	
Henry E. Riggs	California Gamma, 1958	president of Harvey Mudd College and founding president of Keck Graduate Institute	
Harold P. Rodes	Michigan Zeta, 1941	president of Bradley University and General Motors Institute	
Harry S. Rogers	Oregon Alpha, 1914	president of Polytechnic Institute of Brooklyn	
Steven Sample	Illinois Alpha, 1962	president of the University of Southern California	
Timothy Sands		president of Virginia Tech	
Richard Schleusener	South Dakota Alpha, 1949	president of South Dakota School of Mines and Technology	
Herman Schneider	Ohio Beta, 1894	president of the University of Cincinnati	
Myles W. Scoggins	Oklahoma Beta	president of the Colorado School of Mines	
Frederick Seitz	Illinois Alpha, 1932	president of Rockefeller University and the National Academy of Sciences	
Raymond L. Smith	Michigan Beta, 1943	president of the Michigan Technological University	
William T. Snyder	Tennessee Alpha, 1954	chancellor of the University of Tennessee	
Herbert L. Spencer	Pennsylvania Eta, 1921	president of Bucknell University	
Robert Gordon Sproul	California Alpha, 1913	president of the University of California system and University of California, Berkeley	
Dale F. Stein	Michigan Beta, 1958	president of Michigan Technological University	
Julius Adams Stratton	Massachusetts Beta, 1923	president of Massachusetts Institute of Technology	
Jon Strauss	Massachusetts Alpha, 1959	president of Worcester Polytechnic Institute, Harvey Mudd College, Manhattanville College, and Bainbridge Graduate Institute	
Robert L. Sumwalt	Delaware Alpha, 1918	president of the University of South Carolina	
Gary Thomas	New Jersey Gamma, 1960	president of Missouri University of Science and Technology	
Elihu Thomson	Massachusetts Beta, 1870	president of the Massachusetts Institute of Technology	
Lee T. Todd Jr.	Kentucky Alpha, 1968	president of the University of Kentucky	
Curtis J. Tompkins	West Virginia Alpha, 1965	president of Michigan Technological University	
Paul Torgersen	Virginia Beta, 1953	president of Virginia Tech	
Jerald A. Tunheim	South Dakota Beta, 1962	president of Dakota State University	
Robert Van Houten	New Jersey Gamma, 1930	president of New Jersey Institute of Technology	
Blake R. Van Leer	North Carolina Alpha, 1915	president of Georgia Tech	
J. Robert Van Pelt	Michigan Beta, 1922	president of the Montana School of Mines and Michigan Technological University	
Gordon Van Wylen	Michigan Gamma, 1942	president of Hope College	
Charles M. Vest	West Virginia Alpha, 1963	president of the National Academy of Engineering and the Massachusetts Institute of Technology	
Hermann Viets	New York Zeta, 1965	president of Milwaukee School of Engineering	
James W. Wagner	Delaware Alpha, 1975	president of Emory University	
Eric A. Walker	Massachusetts Gamma, 1932	president of Pennsylvania State University	
John Warner	Pennsylvania Gamma, 1919	president of Carnegie Institute of Technology	
Ernst Webe	New York Zeta, 1923	president of the Polytechnic Institute of Brooklyn	
Martin D. Whitaker	Pennsylvania Alpha, 1927	president of Lehigh University	
John A. White	Georgia Alpha, 1962	chancellor of the University of Arkansas	
John F. White	Rhode Island Beta, 1963	president of Cooper Union	
William E. Wickenden	Ohio Alpha, 1904	president of Case School of Applied Science	
Jerome Wiesner,	Michigan Gamma, 1937	president of the Massachusetts Institute of Technology	
Arthur Cutts Willard	Massachusetts Beta, 1893	president of the University of Illinois	
James H. Woodward	Georgia Alpha, 1961	chancellor of University of North Carolina at Charlotte	
Henry T. Yang	Indiana Alpha, 1962	chancellor of the University of California, Santa Barbara	

=== Vice presidents and provosts ===
Name	Chapter and date	Notability	Ref.
Arthur E. Humphrey	Idaho Alpha, 1948	provost and vice president of Lehigh University; dean of the University of Pennsylvania School of Engineering	
Lawrence Lau		vice-chancellor of the Chinese University of Hong Kong and economics professor at Stanford University	
George Pake	Pennsylvania Gamma, 1945	physics professor and provost at Washington University in St. Louis and research executive who helped Xerox PARC	
Frederick Terman	California Gamma, 1920	provost from 1955 to 1965 at Stanford University; dean of the Stanford University School of Engineering	
Sharon L. Wood		executive vice president and provost of the University of Texas at Austin	

=== Deans ===
Name	Chapter and date	Notability	Ref.
Comfort A. Adams	Massachusetts Gamma, 1928	faculty and dean of the engineering school at Harvard College	
Eugene M. DeLoatch	District of Columbia Alpha, 1959	professor and dean of the School of Engineering at Morgan State University	
Daniel C. Drucker	New York Alpha, 1938	civil and mechanical engineer who taught at Brown University and dean of engineering at the University of Illinois	
Jonathan F. Earle		professor and associate dean at the University of Florida College of Engineering	
James Kip Finch		professor, chairman, and dean of the School of Engineering and Applied Science at Columbia University	
Elmer L. Gaden	New York Alpha, 1944	professor emeritus of chemical engineering at the University of Virginia and founder and department chair of biochemical engineering at Columbia University; dean of Columbia's College of Engineering, mathematics, and business administration	
Harold S. Goldberg	New York Iota, 1944	associate dean of the Gordon Institute	
William E. Gordon	New York Delta, 1939	dean and professor of space physics and astronomy and electrical and computer engineering at Rice University	
John H. L. Hansen		professor of electrical engineering and associate dean for research in Erik Jonsson School of Engineering & Computer Science	
William B. Kouwenhoven	Maryland Alpha, 1906	professor and dean at the Johns Hopkins University School of Engineering who developed the cardiac defibrillator	
Karl W. Reid	Massachusetts Beta	chief inclusion officer of Northeastern University and associate dean at Massachusetts Institute of Technology	
Hunter Rouse	Massachusetts Beta, 1929	professor and dean of the College of Engineering at University of Iowa	
Athlestan Spilhaus	New York Epsilon, 1931	geophysicist, oceanographer, dean of the University of Minnesota's Institute of Technology	
Chauncey Starr	California Epsilon, 1932	dean of the UCLA School of Engineering and Applied Science; founder and first president of the Electric Power Research Institute	
John Roy Whinnery	California Alpha, 1937	professor and chairman of the Electric Engineering Department and dean of the College of Engineering at the University of California, Berkeley	

=== Department directors and chairs ===
Name	Chapter and date	Notability	Ref.
Alex Bekker	1983	professor and chair at the Department of Anesthesiology of Rutgers New Jersey Medical School	
Harold Bunger	Georgia Alpha, 1938	head of Georgia Tech's chemistry department	
Rory A. Cooper		professor and chair in the Department of Rehabilitation Science and Technology at the University of Pittsburgh	
Charles Stark Draper	Massachusetts Beta, 1922	founder and director of the Massachusetts Institute of Technology's Instrumentation Laboratory	
Larry Druffel		director emeritus at the Software Engineering Institute at Carnegie Mellon University	
Russell Dupuis	Illinois Alpha, 1970	chair in electro-optics in the School of Electrical and Computer Engineering at Georgia Tech	
Clive Dym	Massachusetts Zeta, 1962	professor emeritus and former chair of the engineering department at Harvey Mudd College	
William Littell Everitt	New York Delta, 1921	professor and department head of electrical engineering at the University of Illinois Urbana-Champaign	
Larry L. Hench		emeritus professor and department chair at the University of Florida and chair of the Ceramic Materials Department at Imperial College London; inventor of Bioglass 45S5	
Nick Holonyak	Illinois Alpha, 1950	chair in electrical and computer engineering and physics at the University of Illinois at Urbana-Champaign; invented the semiconductor laser diode while with General Electric	
Donald L. Katz	Michigan Gamma, 1931	professor and chairman of the Chemical Engineering Department at the University of Michigan.	
Wilbur R. LePage	New York Delta	professor and department chair of electrical and computer engineering at Syracuse University	
Nathan M. Newmark	New Jersey Beta, 1930	head of the University of Illinois Department of Civil and Environmental Engineering, considered one of the founding fathers of earthquake engineering	
Earl R. Parker	Colorado Alpha, 1935	chair of the material sciences department and director of engineering research at the University of California, Berkeley	
Thomas H. Pigford	Georgia Alpha, 1943	professor and the founding chairman of the Department of Nuclear Engineering at the University of California, Berkeley	
Robert P. Sharp	California Beta, 1934	geomorphologist and the chairman of the Division of Geological Sciences at California Institute of Technology	
Herbert A. Simon	Pennsylvania Zeta, 1950	professor of administration and chairman of the Department of Industrial Management at Carnegie Institute of Technology	
Sean Solomon	California Beta, 1966	director of the Lamont–Doherty Earth Observatory and professor of earth and planetary science of Columbia University	
James Thorp	New York Delta, 1959	head of the Department of Electrical and Computer Engineering at Virginia Tech	
Myron Tribus	California Epsilon, 1949	director of the Center for Advanced Engineering Study at the Massachusetts Institute of Technology	
Himie Voxman	Iowa Beta, 1933	director of the School of Music at the University of Iowa	
Charles Hyle Warren	Connecticut Alpha	professor and the chair of geology at Yale University and dean at the Sheffield Scientific School	
Everard Mott Williams		professor and head of the Electrical Engineering Department and Carnegie Mellon University	
Abel Wolman	Maryland Alpha, 1915	professor and chair of the Department of Sanitary Engineering at Johns Hopkins University; chief engineer of the Maryland State Department of Health	
Ronald R. Yager		director of the Machine Intelligence Institute and professor of information systems at Iona College	
Charles Zukowski		professor and former chair of the Department of Electrical Engineering at Columbia University	

=== Professors and faculty ===
Name	Chapter and date	Notability	Ref.
Lilia Ann Abron	DC Alpha	professor at Howard University and the University of the District of Columbia	
Andreas Acrivos	New York Beta, 1950	professor emeritus of science and engineering at the City College of New York	
Massoud Amin	Massachusetts Zeta	professor of electrical engineering at the University of Minnesota	
Albert Babb	Washington Alpha, 1948	professor of chemical engineering at the University of Wisconsin who created the portable dialysis machine	
Arthur Baggeroer		emeritus professor of engineering at the Massachusetts Institute of Technology	
Constantine A. Balanis		electrical engineer and professor at Arizona State University	
John D. Baldeschwieler	New York Delta, 1956	professor emeritus of chemistry at California Institute of Technology	
Issa Batarseh	Illinois Zeta, 1985	professor in the Department of Electrical and Computer Engineering at the University of Central Florida	
Manson Benedict	Massachusetts Beta, 1928	professor of nuclear engineering at the Massachusetts Institute of Technology	
Toby Berger	Connecticut Alpha	information theorist and professor at the University of Virginia and Cornell University	
Robert Byron Bird	Massachusetts Beta, 1944	professor emeritus in the Department of Chemical Engineering at the University of Wisconsin-Madison	
Denis Blackmore		mathematician and professor at New Jersey Institute of Technology	
John H. Booske	Pennsylvania Beta	professor in electrical and computer engineering at the University of Wisconsin–Madison	
Tom Byers	California Alpha, 1975	professor at Stanford University	
Siu-Wai Chan	1979	professor at the Fu Foundation School of Engineering and Applied Science	
Yet-Ming Chiang	Massachusetts Beta, 1980	materials scientist and professor at Massachusetts Institute of Technology	
Edith Clarke	Texas Alpha, 2019	the first female professor of electrical engineering in the United States	
Ray William Clough	Washington Alpha, 1942	professor of structural engineering at the University of California, Berkeley	
Morris Cohen	Minnesota Alpha, 1934	Professor of physical metallurgy and an institute professor at the Massachusetts Institute of Technology	
Edward F. Crawley	Massachusetts Beta, 1976	professor of aeronautics and astronautics at the Massachusetts Institute of Technology	
Charles Dalziel		professor of electrical engineering and computer sciences at the University of California, Berkeley	
Tapan K. Datta	Michigan Epsilon	civil engineering professor at Wayne State University	
Ernest R. Davidson	Indiana Beta, 1958	professor of chemistry at the University of Washington and Indiana University-Bloomington	
Bascom S. Deaver		professor and assistant chairman for undergraduate studies of the physics department at the University of Virginia	
Jacob Pieter Den Hartog	Massachusetts Gamma, 1924	professor of mechanical engineering at the Massachusetts Institute of Technology	
Mildred Dresselhaus	South Carolina Gamma, 1951	nanotechnologist and institute professor of physics and electrical engineering at the Massachusetts Institute of Technolog	
Harry George Drickamer	Michigan Gamma, 1941	professor of chemical engineering, chemistry, and physics at the University of Illinois at Urbana-Champaign	
Doc Edgerton	Massachusetts Beta, 1929	professor of electrical engineering at the Massachusetts Institute of Technology and pioneer in ultra-high-speed photography	
William Alden Edson		engineering professor at Illinois Institute of Technology, Georgia Tech, and Stanford University	
Bruce Eisenstein		professor of electrical and computer engineering at Drexel University	
Wolt Fabrycky		professor emeritus of industrial and systems engineering at Virginia Tech	
Robert Fischell	North Carolina Gamma, 1951	biotechnology inventor with the Johns Hopkins University Applied Physics Laboratory	
John W. Fisher	Missouri Gamma, 1956	professor emeritus of civil engineering at Lehigh University	
James L. Flanagan	Mississippi Alpha, 1948	vice president for research at Rutgers University	
Jay Wright Forrester	Massachusetts Beta, 1939	computer engineer, management theorist, systems scientist, and professor at the MIT Sloan School of Management	
Eli Fromm	Pennsylvania Zeta, 1962	professor of electrical and computer engineering at Drexel University	
Robert G. Gallager	Pennsylvania Delta, 1953	professor of electrical engineering and computer science at the Massachusetts Institute of Technolog	
Richard D. Gitlin	New York Eta, 1964	professor at the University of South Florida	
Shafi Goldwasser	Pennsylvania Gamma, 1979	professor of electrical engineering and computer science at the Massachusetts Institute of Technology and the director of the Simons Institute for the Theory of Computing	
Lois Graham		professor of thermodynamics and cryogenics at the Illinois Institute of Technology	
Harry B. Gray	California Beta, 1957	professor of chemistry at California Institute of Technology	
Ernest Lenard Hall		professor emeritus of mechanical engineering and computer science at the University of Cincinnati	
Steven Ray Hall		professor of aeronautics and astronautics at the Massachusetts Institute of Technology	
Roger F. Harrington	New York Beta, 1948	electrical engineer and professor emeritus at Syracuse University	
Wesley L. Harris	Virginia Alpha, 1963	professor of aeronautics at Massachusetts Institute of Technology	
Hermann A. Haus	Massachusetts Beta, 1948	physicist, electrical engineer, and Institute Professor at the Massachusetts Institute of Technology	
Obed Crosby Haycock		professor and researcher at the University of Utah	
Martin Hellman	New York Epsilon, 1966	professor at Stanford University who co-developed public-key cryptography	
Lawrence Paul Horwitz	New York Epsilon	professor of physics at Tel Aviv University	
Hoyt C. Hottel	Massachusetts Beta, 1922	professor in the department of chemical engineering at the Massachusetts Institute of Technology	
George W. Housner	California Beta, 1933	professor of earthquake engineering at the California Institute of Technology	
Frederick Vinton Hunt	Ohio Gamma	professor at Harvard University who worked in the field of acoustic engineering	
Esmaiel Jabbari	2006	professor of chemical engineering at the University of South Carolina	
Riki Kobayashi		professor of chemical engineering at Rice University	
Robert S. Langer	New York Delta, 1970	professor at the Massachusetts Institute of Technology	
Joseph Nisbet LeConte	California Alpha, 1892	professor of analytical mechanics at the University of California, Berkeley; explorer of the Sierra Nevada; and cartographer	
Luna Leopold	Wisconsin Alpha, 1936	professor emeritus in geology and landscape architecture at the University of California, Berkeley; hydrologist with the United States Geological Survey	
Warren K. Lewis	Massachusetts Beta, 1905	professor at the Massachusetts Institute of Technology considered the father of modern chemical engineering	
Hans W. Liepmann	California Beta, 1938	emeritus professor of aeronautics at the California Institute of Technology	
Tung-Yen Lin	California Alpha, 1931	structural engineer and professor at the University of California, Berkeley	
R. Duncan Luce	Massachusetts Beta, 1945	professor of cognitive science at the University of California, Irvine; known for work in the field of mathematical psychology	
Calvin Mackie		professor at the University of Michigan and Tulane University	
James Massey	Massachusetts Beta, 1960	cryptographer and professor emeritus of digital technology at ETH Zurich	
Raymond D. Mindlin	New York Alpha, 1932	professor of applied science at Columbia University	
Chiang Ti Ming	California Beta	particle physicist and child prodigy associated with Cornell University and Harvard University	
Mahta Moghaddam		professor of electrical engineering at the University of Southern California	
Mark Monmonier	Maryland Alpha	professor of geography and the environment at the Maxwell School of Citizenship and Public Affairs of Syracuse University	
Salvatore D. Morgera	Florida Epsilon, 1970	professor emeritus at McGill University, Concordia University, and Florida Atlantic University	
W. Jason Morgan	Georgia Alpha, 1957	professor emeritus of geology and geosciences at Princeton University	
Ali H. Nayfeh	California Gamma, 1962	professor of engineering at Virginia Tech	
Celeste Nelson	Massachusetts Beta	professor of chemical engineering and biological engineering at Princeton University	
Pearn P. Niiler	Pennsylvania Alpha, 1960	oceanographer and professor at the Scripps Institution of Oceanography and Oregon State University	
Matthew Ohland		engineering education professor at Purdue University	
Yale Patt	Massachusetts Epsilon, 1962	professor of electrical and computer engineering at University of Texas at Austin	
Irene C. Peden		professor emerita of electrical engineering at the University of Washington	
Arun G . Phadke	Illinois Beta, 1955	research professor in the Department of Electrical and Computer Engineering at Virginia Tech	
Henry Petroski	New York Xi, 1963	professor of civil engineering and history at Duke University	
Michael Porter	New Jersey Delta, 1969	professor at the Harvard Business School	
Calvin Quate	Utah Alpha, 1944	professor emeritus of applied physics and electrical engineering at Stanford University	
Thomas F. Quatieri		electrical engineer and senior technical staff member at the MIT Lincoln Laboratory	
Eli Ruckenstein	New York Nu, 1949	professor of chemical and biological engineering University at Buffalo	
Rolf Heinrich Sabersky	California Beta	professor emeritus in mechanical engineering at the California Institute of Technology	
Mischa Schwartz	Virginia Beta, 1945	professor emeritus of electrical engineering at Columbia University	
Harry Bolton Seed	California Alpha, 1944	professor at the University of California, Berkeley regarded as the founding father of geotechnical earthquake engineering	
John Shepherd	Texas Beta, 1988	professor of epidemiology and population sciences at the University of Hawaiʻi Cancer Center	
Otto J. M. Smith		professor of electrical engineering at the University of California, Berkeley	
Charles Proteus Steinmetz	Illinois Alpha, 1902	professor of math and electrical engineering at Union College	
Bruce Strickrott	Florida Epsilon	deep sea explorer, senior pilot, and manager of the DSV Alvin Submersible Engineering and Operations Group at the Woods Hole Oceanographic Institution	
Lee Swindlehurst	Utah Beta, 1985	professor of electrical engineering and computer science at the University of California, Irvine	
Erika Moore Taylor		biomedical engineer and assistant professor at the University of Florida in Gainesville	
Malvin Carl Teich	1989	professor emeritus of electrical engineering at Columbia University	
Stephen Timoshenko	California Gamma, 1901	professor of strengths of materials at the Kyiv Polytechnic Institute, considered the father of modern engineering mechanics	
Alvin V. Tollestrup	Utah Alpha, 1944	physics professor at the California Institute of Technology and researcher at Fermilab	
John G. Trump	New York Zeta, 1929	electrical engineer and professor at the Massachusetts Institute of Technology	
J. R. Tucker	1995	an academic who made contributions to the fields of electronics, physics, and microwave theory	
James Van Allen	Iowa Beta, 1935	space physicist at the University of Iowa who discovered the Van Allen radiation belts	
Robert J. Van de Graaff	Alabama Beta, 1922	physicist, research associate, and professor at the Massachusetts Institute of Technology	
Harold Webb		professor of electrical engineering at the University of Illinois, Urbana-Champaign	
Julia Weertman	Illinois Gamma, 1946	professor of materials science and engineering at Northwestern University	
Michael Wendl	Missouri Gamma, 1989	professor in the departments of medicine-oncology and mechanical engineering at Washington University in St. Louis	
Bernard Widrow	California Gamma, 1951	professor of electrical engineering at Stanford University	
Jack Wolf	Pennsylvania Delta, 1956	professor of computer science at the University of California, San Diego	
Joyce Wong		professor of biomedical engineering and materials science at Boston University	
A. Wayne Wymore	Arizona Alpha, 1949	professor emeritus at the University of Arizona, and one of the founding fathers of systems engineering	
Lotfi A. Zadeh		professor of computer science at the University of California, Berkeley best known for proposing fuzzy mathematics	
Richard W. Ziolkowski		professor of electrical and computer engineering at the University of Arizona	

== Aerospace and aviation ==
=== Administration ===
Name	Chapter and date	Notability	Ref.
Waleed Abdalati	New York Beta, 1985	NASA Chief Scientist	
Aaron Cohen	Texas Delta, 1952	acting Deputy Administrator of NASA; director of engineering and manager of the Space Shuttle Program	
Charles J. Donlan	Massachusetts Beta, 1938	NASA researcher and manager	
Roy Estess		director of the Stennis Space Center	
James C. Fletcher	Utah Alpha, 1940	Administrator of the National Aeronautics and Space Administration	
T. Keith Glennan	Connecticut Alpha, 1927	1st Administrator of the National Aeronautics and Space Administration and president of Case Institute of Technology	
Gerald D. Griffin	Texas Delta	NASA flight director during the Apollo program and director of Johnson Space Center	
Michael D. Griffin	Maryland Beta, 1977	Administrator of the National Aeronautics and Space Administration and Under Secretary of Defense for Research and Engineering	
J. Lynn Helms	Michigan Gamma, 1943	Administrator of the Federal Aviation Administration	
D. Brainerd Holmes	New York Delta, 1943	director of NASA's crewed spaceflight program and president of Raytheon	
J. Wayne Littles	Georgia Alpha	director of the Marshall Space Flight Center	
George M. Low	New York Gamma, 1948	Administrator of the National Aeronautics and Space Administration and president of the Rensselaer Polytechnic Institute	
T. Allan McArtor		administrator of the U.S. Federal Aviation Administration	
Bill Pickering	California Beta, 1932	head of the Jet Propulsion Laboratory	
Abe Silverstein		manager at NASA and its predecessor, the National Advisory Committee for Aeronautics	
Clarence Syvertson		director of the Ames Research Center	
Wernher von Braun	Michigan Gamma, 1932	director of the Marshall Space Flight Center; first president and chairman of the National Space Institute	

=== Astronauts ===
Name	Chapter and date	Notability	Ref.
Thomas Akers	Missouri Beta, 1992	astronaut in NASA's Space Shuttle program	
Buzz Aldrin	Massachusetts Beta, 1962	NASA astronaut and second person to walk on the moon	
Scott Altman	Illinois Alpha, 1981	NASA astronaut, naval aviator, engineer, and test pilot	
William Anders	Ohio Eta, 1962	NASA astronaut, U.S. Ambassador to Norway, chairman of the Nuclear Regulatory Commission, and chairman of the Nuclear Regulatory Commission	
James P. Bagian	Pennsylvania Zeta, 1973	NASA astronaut and physician	
Michael A. Baker	Texas Alpha, 1975	NASA astronaut, and the International Space Station program manager for international and crew operations	
John-David F. Bartoe	Pennsylvania Alpha, 1966	NASA astronaut and astrophysicist	
Charles Bassett	Texas Beta, 1960	NASA astronaut, electrical engineer, and test pilot	
Bob Behnken	Missouri Gamma, 1992	NASA astronaut and former Chief of the Astronaut Office	
Guion Bluford	Ohio Eta, 1973	NASA astronaut, aerospace engineer, and fighter pilot	
Stephen Bowen	Maryland Gamma, 1986	NASA astronaut and United States Navy submariner	
Ken Bowersox	Maryland Gamma, 1978	NASA astronaut	
Roy D. Bridges Jr.	Colorado Zeta, 1965	NASA astronaut and United States Air Force major general	
Mark N. Brown	Indiana Alpha, 1973	NASA astronaut	
John S. Bull	Texas Gamma, 1957	NASA astronaut, fighter pilot, test pilot, mechanical engineer, and aeronautical engineer	
Robert J. Cenker	Pennsylvania Beta, 1970	NASA astronaut, aerospace engineer, and electrical engineer	
Gene Cernan	Indiana Alpha, 1956	NASA astronaut and lunar explorer, electrical engineer, aeronautical engineer, and fighter pilot	
Roger B. Chaffee	Indiana Alpha, 1957	NASA astronaut, aviator, and aeronautical engineer who died on Apollo 1	
Gregory Chamitoff	California Mu, 1984	NASA astronaut and engineer	
Raja Chari	Colorado Zeta, 1999	NASA astronaut, test pilot, and United States Air Force brigadier general	
Mary L. Cleave	Utah Gamma, 1979	NASA astronaut and civil and environmental engineer	
Robert Crippen	Texas Alpha, 1960	NASA astronaut, test pilot, and aerospace engineer	
Jan Davis	Alabama Alpha, 1977	NASA astronaut and mechanical engineer	
Bonnie J. Dunbar	Texas Epsilon, 1983	NASA astronaut and ceramics engineer	
Donn F. Eisele	Ohio Eta, 1960	NASA astronaut, test pilot, and command module pilot for the Apollo 7 mission	
Joe Engle	Kansas Alpha, 1955	NASA astronaut and aeronautical engineer	
Ronald Evans	Kansas Alpha, 1956	NASA astronaut, Command Module Pilot on Apollo 17, electrical engineer, and aeronautical engineer,	
John M. Fabian	Washington Beta, 1962	NASA astronaut and aerospace engineer	
Kevin A. Ford	Indiana Gamma, 1982	NASA astronaut	
Stephen Frick	Maryland Gamma, 1986	NASA astronaut	
C. Gordon Fullerton	California Beta, 1957	NASA astronaut and research pilot	
Dale Gardner	Illinois Alpha, 1970	NASA astronaut and naval flight officer	
Owen Garriott	Oklahoma Alpha, 1953	NASA astronaut and electrical engineer	
Edward Gibson	New York Kappa, 1959	NASA astronaut, engineer, and physicist	
Gus Grissom	Indiana Alpha, 1950	NASA astronaut, test pilot, and mechanical engineer who died on Apollo 1	
Fred Haise	Oklahoma Alpha, 1959	NASA astronaut and Apollo Lunar Module pilot	
James D. Halsell	Ohio Eta, 1985	NASA astronaut	
Terry Hart	Pennsylvania Alpha, 1968	NASA astronaut, pilot, and mechanical and electrical engineer	
Charles O. Hobaugh	Maryland Gamma, 1984	NASA astronaut	
Doug Hurley	Louisiana Beta, 1988	NASA astronaut. engineer, and pilot	
Rick Husband	Texas Beta, 1980	NASA astronaut and fighter pilot who died on the Space Shuttle Columbia	
Gregory C. Johnson	Washington Alpha, 1977	NASA astronaut, naval aviator, test pilot, and aerospace engineer	
Gene Kranz	Missouri Epsilon, 1954	Apollo XIII astronaut and NASA's second Chief Flight Director	
Frederick W. Leslie	Texas Alpha, 1974	astronaut and scientist who flew on the NASA STS-73 Space Shuttle mission as a payload specialist	
Byron K. Lichtenberg	Rhode Island Alpha, 1969	NASA astronaut and engineer	
Mike Massimino	New York Alpha, 1984	NASA astronaut and professor of mechanical engineering	
Richard Mastracchio	Connecticut Beta, 1982	NASA astronaut	
Michael J. McCulley	Indiana Alpha, 1970	NASA astronaut, aviator, test pilot, and metallurgical engineer	
James McDivitt	Michigan Gamma, 1959	NASA astronaut and United States Air Force brigadier general	
Steven R. Nagel	Illinois Alpha, 1969	NASA astronaut, test pilot, and aeronautical and mechanical engineer	
Lisa Nowak	Maryland Gamma, 1985	NASA astronaut, naval flight officer, and test pilot	
Karen Nyberg	North Dakota Beta, 1994	NASA astronaut and mechanical engineer	
William Oefelein	Oregon Alpha, 1988	NASA astronaut, freelance adventure writer, and photographer	
Ellison Onizuka	Colorado Beta, 1969	NASA astronaut and engineer who died on the Space Shuttle Challenger	
Gary Payton	Georgia Alpha, 1986	NASA astronaut and Deputy Undersecretary of the Air Force	
Alan G. Poindexter	Georgia Alpha, 1986	NASA astronaut	
Joseph M. Prahl	Ohio Alpha, 1963	NASA astronaut, mechanical engineer, and professor at Case Western Reserve University	
Garrett Reisman	Pennsylvania Delta, 1991	NASA astronaut and engineer	
Judith Resnik	Pennsylvania Gamma, 1970	NASA astronaut, pilot, electrical engineer, software engineer, and biomedical engineer who died on the Space Shuttle Challenger	
Richard N. Richards	Maryland Alpha, 1969	NASA astronaut, aviator, test pilot, and chemical engineer	
Albert Sacco	Massachusetts Epsilon, 1973	NASA astronaut and chemical engineer	
Robert Satcher		NASA astronaut, orthopedic surgeon, and chemical engineer	
Dick Scobee	Arizona Alpha, 1965	NASA astronaut who died on the Space Shuttle Challenger	
David Scott	Massachusetts Beta, 1962	NASA astronaut and lunar explorer	
Brewster H. Shaw	Wisconsin Alpha, 1967	NASA astronaut and executive at Boeing	
Donald A. Thomas	Ohio Alpha, 1977	NASA astronaut and materials engineer	
Kathryn R. Thornton	Virginia Alpha, 1974	NASA astronaut and associate dean for graduate programs at the University of Virginia School of Engineering and Applied Science	
Richard H. Truly	Georgia Alpha, 1959	NASA astronaut and administrator	
Ed White	Michigan Gamma, 1952	NASA astronaut, test pilot, and aeronautical engineer who died on Apollo 1	
Clifton Williams	Alabama Alpha, 1954	NASA astronaut, naval aviator, test pilot, and mechanical engineer	
John Young	Georgia Alpha, 1952	NASA astronaut, lunar explorer, test pilot, and aeronautical engineer	

== Art and architecture ==
Name	Chapter and date	Notability	Ref.
Keplar B. Johnson	California Alpha	architect for the U.S. Forest Service	
Cyril M. Harris	New York Alpha, 1938	architect and acoustical designer of more than 100 concert halls and auditoriums, including the Metropolitan Opera House	
Fazlur Rahman Khan	Illinois Alpha, 1950	architect and structural engineer	
O. Winston Link	New York Zeta, 1937	photographer	
Shirley Jane Vernon	Pennsylvania Beta	architect and educator	
George Malcolm White	Illinois Alpha, 1942	Architect of the Capitol	

== Business ==
Name	Chapter and date	Notability	Ref.
Sylvia Acevedo	New Mexico Alpha, 1979	CEO of the Girl Scouts of the USA	
Walter Hull Aldridge	New York Alpha,1887	president of the Texas Gulf Sulphur Company and managing director of the Consolidated Mining and Smelting Company of Canada	
Paul Allaire	Massachusetts Alpha, 1960	CEO and chairman of Xerox	
Gil Amelio	Georgia Alpha, 1965	CEO of National Semiconductor and Apple Computer	
John Leland Atwood	Texas Alpha, 1928	president, and CEO of North American Aviation	
Norman R. Augustine	New Jersey Delta, 1957	president and CEO of Martin Marietta; president and CEO of Lockheed Martin, and United States Under Secretary of the Army	
Leo Baekeland	New York Alpha, 1882	founder of the General Bakelite Company; inventor of bakelite and Velox photographic paper	
Ervin G. Bailey	Ohio Gamma, 1903	founding president of Bailey Meter Company	
William F. Ballhaus Sr.	California Gamma, 1940	president of Beckman Instruments	
William F. Ballhaus Jr.	California Alpha, 1967	president and CEO of The Aerospace Corporation	
Mary Barra	Michigan Zeta, 1985	chair and CEO of General Motors	
John Barry	Minnesota Alpha, 1945	former president of WD-40 Company	
Stephen Bechtel Jr.	Indiana Alpha, 1946	co-owner of Bechtel	
Jeff Bezos	New Jersey Delta, 1986	Amazon.com founder	
Michael Birck	Indiana Alpha, 1961	co-founder and chairman of Tellabs	
Ed Bock	Iowa Alpha, 1938	former chairman of Monsanto	
Amar Bose	Massachusetts Beta, 1952	founder and chairman of Bose Corporation	
Stephen Brobst		technology executive	
George R. Brown	Colorado Alpha, 1922	co-founder of Brown & Root Inc.	
J. Fred Bucy Jr.	Texas Beta, 1951	president and CEO of Texas Instruments	
Charles Frederick Burgess	Wisconsin Alpha, 1895	founder of the Burgess Battery Company; founder of the University of Wisconsin-Madison Department of Chemical Engineering	
Donald C. Burnham	Indiana Alpha, 1936	CEO and board chairman of Westinghouse Electric Corporation	
Wesley G. Bush	Massachusetts Beta, 1983	former CEO and chairman of Northrop Grumman	
Rod Canion	Texas Epsilon, 1966	co-founder, first president, and CEO of Compaq	
Curtis Carlson	New Jersey Beta	president and CEO of SRI International	
Willis Carrier	New York Delta, 1901	founder of the Carrier Corporation and inventor of modern air conditioning	
E. Finley Carter		electrical engineer with Sylvania Electric Products and president of SRI International	
Colby Chandler	Maine Alpha, 1950	CEO and chairman of the Eastman Kodak Company	
John S. Chen	Rhode Island Alpha, 1978	executive chairman and CEO of BlackBerry Limited; CEO and president of Sybase	
John Cioffi	Illinois Alpha, 1978	founder and president of Amati Communications Corporation	
Walker Lee Cisler	New York Delta, 1922	president of the Detroit Edison Company	
A. James Clark	Maryland Beta, 1950	chairman and CEO of Clark Enterprises, Inc.	
Richard Coar	Massachusetts Delta, 1942	president of Pratt & Whitney	
Ed Cole	Michigan Gamma, 1952	president and CEO of General Motors	
Philip M. Condit	California Alpha, 1963	president, CEO, and chairman of Boeing	
Joseph Coors	New York Delta, 1940	president of Coors Brewing Company	
Cleo F. Craig	Missouri Alpha, 1913	president and board chairman of AT&T	
Lester Crown	Illinois Gamma, 1946	president and chairman of General Dynamics	
Everette Lee DeGolyer	Oklahoma Alpha, 1911	general manager, president, and chairman of the Amerada Petroleum Corporation and co-founder of Geophysical Service Incorporated	
Francis deSouza	Massachusetts Beta, 1992	CEO of Illumina	
Ray Dolby	California Gamma, 1957	founder and chairman of Dolby	
Herbert Henry Dow	Michigan Gamma, 1919	founder and president of Dow Chemical	
Joseph Engelberger	New York Alpha, 1946	co-founded and president of Unimation	
Pete Estes	Ohio Beta, 1940	president of General Motors	
Robert Everett	North Carolina Gamma, 1942	founding member and president of the Mitre Corporation	
Illinois Alpha, 1962	George M. C. Fisher	CEO and chairman of Eastman Kodak Company; president, chairman, and CEO of Motorola	
James Brown Fisk	Massachusetts Beta, 1931	president of Bell Labs	
Robert Frankenberg	California Eta, 1974	chairman, president and CEO of Novell	
Donald N. Frey	Michigan Gamma, 1947	chairman and CEO Bell & Howell	
H. Laurance Fuller	New York Delta, 1961	president, board chairman, and CEO of Amoco	
Joseph G. Gavin Jr.	Massachusetts Beta, 1941	president and COO of the Grumman; engineer responsible for the development of the Apollo Lunar Module	
Bill George	Georgia Alpha, 1964	chairman and CEO of Medtronic	
Raymond Gilmartin	New York Mu, 1963	president and CEO of Becton-Dickinson; chairman and CEO of Merck & Co.	
Tom Mercer Girdler	Pennsylvania Alpha, 1901	first president of Republic Steel	
Adi Godrej	Massachusetts Beta	chairman of the Godrej Group	
Robert Goizueta	Connecticut Alpha, 1953	chairman, president, and CEO of The Coca-Cola Company	
Bernard Marshall Gordon	Massachusetts Beta, 1948	founder and chairman of Analogic Corporation; considered "the father of high-speed analog-to-digital conversion"	
John F. Gordon	Michigan Gamma, 1922	president of General Motors	
Bill Gore	Delaware Alpha, 1932	founder and president of W. L. Gore & Associates	
Robert W. Gore	Delaware Alpha, 1959	president and chairman of W. L. Gore & Associates	
Eugene Grace	Pennsylvania Alpha, 1899	president and chairman of Bethlehem Steel	
Harry Gray	Pennsylvania Delta, 1944	CEO and chairman of United Technologies	
Crawford Greenewalt	Delaware Alpha, 1922	president and chairman of the DuPont Company	
Andrew Grove	New York Eta, 1960	CEO of Intel Corporation	
Leroy Grumman	New York Delta, 1916	founder of Grumman Aircraft Engineering Co.	
Willard Hackerman	Maryland Alpha, 1938	CEO of Whiting-Turner	
Patrick E. Haggerty	Wisconsin Beta, 1936	co-founder, president, and chairman of Texas Instruments	
Michael Lawrence Haider	California Gamma, 1927	president of the Standard Oil Company	
John Hall	Tennessee Beta	CEO of Ashland Oil Inc.	
Elmer Beseler Harris	Alabama Alpha, 1962	president, CEO, and chairman of Alabama Power	
Arthur Hauspurg	New York Alpha, 1945	chairman of Consolidated Edison	
George H. Heilmeier	Pennsylvania Delta, 1958	president and CEO of Bellcore; chief technical officer and vice president at Texas Instruments	
Herman Hollerith	New York Alpha, 1879	founder of Computing-Tabulating-Recording Company (now IBM)	
Jensen Huang	Oregon Alpha, 1984	co-founder, president, and CEO of Nvidia	
Linda Hudson	Florida Alpha, 1972	president and CEO of BAE Systems Inc.	
Charles DeLano Hine		vice-president and general manager of the Southern Pacific Lines	
Frederic Holloway	Georgia Alpha, 1935	vice president of science and technology at Exxon; president of Esso Research & Engineering Co.	
Lee Iacocca	Pennsylvania Alpha, 1945	COE and president of Chrysler and president of the Ford Motor Company	
Irwin M. Jacobs	New York Delta, 1956	co-founder and former chairman of Qualcomm	
Paul E. Jacobs	California Alpha, 1984	CEO of Globalstar and executive chairman of Qualcomm	
Allen F. Jacobson	Iowa Alpha, 1947	CEO of 3M	
Frank B. Jewett	California Beta, 1898	first president of Bell Labs	
Ray O. Johnson		CEO of Technology Innovation Institute and operating partner at Bessemer Venture Partners	
Charles F. Jones	Texas Alpha, 1933	president of Humble Oil (now Exxon)	
J. Erik Jonsson	Indiana Beta, 1922	co-founder and president of Texas Instruments; Mayor of Dallas	
Jerry Junkins	Iowa Alpha, 1959	president, chairman, and CEO of Texas Instruments	
Frederick Kappel	Minnesota Alpha, 1924	president of Western Electric, chairman of AT&T, and governor and chairman of the United States Postal Service	
Mervin Kelly	Missouri Beta, 1914	director of research, president, and chairman of the board of Bell Labs	
Kevin J. Kennedy	New Jersey Beta, 1979	CEO of Quanergy Systems and president and CEO of Avaya	
Charles F. Kettering	Ohio Gamma, 1904	founder of Delco and head of research at General Motors	
Jeong H. Kim	Maryland Alpha, 1983	president of Bell Labs and co-founder and executive chairman of Kiswe Mobile Inc.	
Paul Wilbur Klipsch	California Gamma, 1926	founder of Klipsch Audio Technologies and high fidelity audio pioneer	
Semon Knudsen	Michigan Gamma, 1936	president of Ford Motor Company and chairman of White Motor Company	
Bill Lear	Michigan Alpha, 1955	founder of Learjet and inventor of the car radio and the 8-track cartridge	
William States Lee III	New Jersey Delta, 1951	president, chairman, and CEO of Duke Power; cofounder of the Institute of Nuclear Power Operations	
Roger Linquist	Indiana Alpha	chairman, CEO, and co-founder of Metro PCS and founder of LJ Entertainment Inc.	
Matthew Luckiesh	Indiana Alpha, 1909	director of General Electric's Lighting Research Laboratory	
Robert W. Lundeen	Oregon Alpha, 1942	executive vice president and chairman of the board of Dow Chemical Company	
John C. Malone	Connecticut Alpha, 1963	CEO of Tele-Communications Inc. and chairman of Liberty Media, Liberty Global, and Qurate Retail Group	
John Franklyn Mars	Connecticut Alpha, 1957	CEO, chairman, and president of Mars Inc.	
Glenn L. Martin	Maryland Beta, 1947	aviation pioneer and founder of what is now Lockheed Martin	
Edward R. McCracken	Iowa Alpha, 1966	CEO of Silicon Graphics	
F. James McDonald	Michigan Gamma, 1944	president and CEO of General Motors	
Sanford N. McDonnell	Colorado Beta, 1948	chairman and CEO of McDonnell Douglas	
Russell W. McFall	Maryland Beta, 1942	chairman and CEO of Western Union Telegraph Co.	
John E. McGlade	Pennsylvania Alpha, 1976	CEO, president, and chairman of Air Products	
Ruben F. Mettler	California Beta, 1944	chairman and CEO of TRW Inc.	
Otto N. Miller	Iowa Alpha, 1930	president and chairman of Chevron Corporation	
George P. Mitchell	Texas Delta, 1940	founder of Mitchell Energy and Development Corporation who pioneered the economic extraction of shale gas	
Alan Mulally	Kansas Alpha. 1968	CEO of Boeing Commercial Airplanes; president and CEO of Ford Motor Company	
William Beverly Murphy	Wisconsin Alpha	president and CEO of Campbell's	
Arun Netravali	Texas Gamma, 1969	president of Bell Laboratories	
Ray Noorda	Utah Alpha, 1949	president and CEO of Novell	
John Northrop	California Delta, 1949	aircraft industrialist and designer who founded the Northrop Corporation	
Henry Furlow Owsley III	New Jersey Delta	CEO and founder of Gordian Group LLC	
David Packard	California Gamma, 1934	co-founder, president, and CEO of Hewlett-Packard; U.S. Deputy Secretary of Defense; and president of the Uniformed Services University of the Health Sciences	
Donald Petersen	Washington Alpha, 1946	CEO of Ford Motor Company	
Kurt Petersen	California Alpha, 1970	founder and CEO of Cepheid and SiTime	
Thomas L. Phillips	Virginia Beta, 1947	CEO and chairman of Raytheon	
Frank Piasecki	New York Epsilon, 1940	founder of Piasecki Helicopter and Piasecki Aircraft who pioneered the tandem-rotor helicopter	
Edmund T. Pratt Jr.	North Carolina Gamma, 1947	CEO, chairman, and president of Pfizer	
Robert Pritzker	Illinois Beta, 1946	co-founder and president of The Marmon Group	
Monroe Jackson Rathbone II	Pennsylvania Alpha, 1921	CEO, chairman, and president of Standard Oil of New Jersey	
Jerry S. Rawls	Texas Beta, 1967	co-founder and chairman of Finisar	
Lee Raymond	Wisconsin Alpha, 1960	CEO and chairman of ExxonMobil	
John S. Reed	Massachusetts Beta, 1961	chairman of the New York Stock Exchange; chairman and CEO of Citicorp, Citibank, and Citigroup	
Philip D. Reed	Wisconsin Alpha, 1921	CEO and president of General Electric	
Eberhardt Rechtin	California Beta, 1946	president and CEO of The Aerospace Corporation	
Edwin W. Rice	New York Alpha, 1880	president and co-founder of General Electric	
Alexander N. Rossolimo	New York Eta	think tank executive, entrepreneur, and corporate director	
Henry Samueli	California Epsilon, 1975	co-founder of Broadcom Corporation and owner of the Anaheim Ducks	
David Sarnoff	New York Lambda, 1911	president of RCA	
Henry Schacht	Connecticut Alpha, 1956	CEO and chairman of Cummins Diesel and CEO of Lucent Technologies	
Kenneth L. Schroeder		CEO of KLA-Tencor	
Peter C. Schultz	New Jersey Beta, 1964	president of Heraeus Tenevo Inc., co-inventor of the fiber optics used for telecommunications	
Peter H. Soderberg	Connecticut Alpha, 1968	CEO Hillrom; president and CEO of Welch Allyn	
Charles E. Spahr	Kansas Alpha, 1934	president and CEO of Sohio (now Standard Oil of Ohio)	
Elmer Ambrose Sperry	New Jersey Alpha, 1921	founder of Sperry Electric Railway Company and the Hewitt-Sperry Automatic Airplane	
Philip Sporn	New York Alpha, 1917	president and CEO of the American Gas and Electric Company	
Ray Stata	Massachusetts Beta, 1957	co-founder, CEO, and chairman of Analog Devices	
Charles A. Stone	Massachusetts Beta, 1888	co-founder and chairman of Stone & Webster	
Ronald Sugar	California Epsilon, 1968	CEO and chairman of the Northrop Grumman; chairman of Uber	
John A. Swanson	New York Delta, 1962	founder, president, CEO of ANSYS Inc.	
William H. Swanson	California Mu, 1972	chairman and CEO of Raytheon Company	
Frederick Winslow Taylor	New Jersey Alpha, 1893	one of the first management consultants	
Daniel Michael Tellep	California Alpha, 1954	CEO and chairman of Lockheed Corporation	
Andrew J. Viterbi	Massachusetts Beta, 1957	co-founder of Qualcomm and inventor of the Viterbi algorithm	
Edwin S. Webster	Massachusetts Beta, 1888	co-founder, president, and chairman of Stone & Webster	
David N. Weidman	Utah Beta, 1978	CEO, chairman, and president of Celanese Corporation	
Jack Welch	Massachusetts Zeta, 1957	CEO and chairman of General Electric	
Glenn B. Warren	Wisconsin Alpha, 1919	vice president and general manager of the turbine division of General Electric	
Herbert Wertheim	Florida Beta, 1962	founder and president of Brain Power Incorporated	
George Weyerhaeuser	Connecticut Alpha, 1949	president, CEO, and chairman and Weyerhaeuser	
Sam B. Williams	Michigan Eta, 1942	founder and president of Williams International	
Edgar S. Woolard Jr.	North Carolina Alpha, 1956	CEO and chairman of DuPont	
Irma Wyman	Michigan Gamma, 2019	vice president and CIO of Honeywell	
Rouzbeh Yassini	West Virginia Alpha, 1981	co-founder, CEO, and president of LANcity; founder, president, and CEO of YAS Broadband Ventures	
John A. Young	Oregon Alpha, 1953	CEO of Hewlett-Packard	

== Engineering ==
=== Aerospace engineering ===
Name	Chapter and date	Notability	Ref.
Yvonne Brill	South Carolina Gamma, 1945	rocket and jet propulsion engineer with Douglas Aircraft and Astro Electronics	
Julie Wertz Chen	Massachusetts Beta	systems engineer for the Soil Moisture Active Passive, Cassini, and InSight Mars missions	
Antonio Ferri	New York Zeta, 1934	aerodynamics scientist who oversaw the development of the first jet aircraft	
Louis Friedman	New York Zeta, 1970	astronautics engineer the Jet Propulsion Laboratory; co-founder of The Planetary Society	
Willis Hawkins	Michigan Gamma, 1937	aeronautical engineer for Lockheed Corporation	
John Houbolt	Illinois Alpha, 1940	aerospace engineer with NASA and Langley Research Center	
Jerome Clarke Hunsaker	Massachusetts Beta, 1912	aeronautical engineer who helped design the Curtiss NC-4	
Maxwell Hunter	Massachusetts Beta, 1944	aerospace engineer with Douglas Aircraft Company who worked on the design of the Douglas B-42, Douglas B-43, the MGR-1 Honest John, and Nike-Ajax	
Kelly Johnson	Michigan Gamma, 1932	aerospace engineer who worked on the Lockheed U-2 and SR-71 Blackbird	
Conrad Lau	Massachusetts Beta	aeronautical engineer with Chance Vought	
George C. Martin	Washington Alpha	aeronautical engineer who was the project engineer on the Boeing B-47 and the Boeing B-52	
Andrew Mishkin	California Epsilon	senior systems engineer at the Jet Propulsion Laboratory	
JoAnn H. Morgan		aerospace engineer and the first female engineer at the John F. Kennedy Space Center	
Jon Myer	1972	engineer and physicist for Hughes Aircraft Company and Hughes Research Laboratories	
Jerry Nelson	California Beta, 1965	astronomer at the Lawrence Berkeley National Laboratory known for his pioneering work designing segmented mirror telescopes	
Robert J. Parks		aerospace engineer and pioneer in the space program at the Jet Propulsion Laboratory	
Jerome Pearson		aerospace engineer for the NASA Langley and Ames research centers during the Apollo program	
Maynard Pennell	Washington Alpha	aeronautical engineering and aircraft designer with Boeing	
Francis Rogallo	California Gamma, 1933	aeronautical engineer with the National Advisory Committee for Aeronautics who invented the Rogallo wing	
Harold Rosen	Louisiana Beta, 1944	electrical engineer who led the team that designed and built Syncom, for Hughes Aircraft Company	
Stanley F. Schmidt	Wisconsin Beta, 1946	aerospace engineer at the Ames Research Center	
Harrison Storms	Illinois Gamma, 1938	aeronautical engineer with North American Aviation who managed the design and construction of the Apollo Command/Service Module	
Frank L. Stulen	Pennsylvania Gamma, 1942	mechanical engineer and vice president of engineering at Parsons Corporation	
Joe Sutter	Washington Alpha, 1943	engineer for the Boeing Airplane Company and manager of the design team for the Boeing 747	
Theodore von Kármán	California Beta, 1902	aerospace engineer, mathematician, and physicist who worked in aeronautics and astronautics	
Hans von Ohain	Ohio Eta, 1935	physicist, aerospace engineer, and the designer of the first aircraft to use a turbojet engine	
Richard Leroy Walters	Indiana Alpha	jet propulsion engineer with Allied Signal Aerospace	
Richard T. Whitcomb	Massachusetts Alpha, 1943	aeronautical engineer at the Langley Research Center	
Dean Wooldridge	California Beta, 1932	aerospace engineer and director of research for the electronics department of Hughes Aircraft	

=== Chemical and petroleum engineering ===
Name	Chapter and date	Notability	Ref.
Melvin De Groote	Ohio Gamma, 1915	chemist with Petrolite who held 925 patents	
Vladimir Haensel	Illinois Gamma, 1935	chemical engineer who invented the platforming process	
Michel T. Halbouty	Texas Delta, 1930	petroleum engineer, geologist, and wildcatter	
Julian W. Hill	Missouri Gamma, 1924	chemical engineer with DuPont who developed nylon	
Ralph Landau	Pennsylvania Delta, 1937	chemical engineer with M. W. Kellogg Company and Kellex Corporation	
Ray McIntire	Kansas Alpha, 1940	research engineer for The Dow Chemical Company who invented Styrofoam	
Thomas Midgley Jr.	New York Delta, 1911	chemical engineer for General Motors who played a major role in developing leaded gasoline	
Olagoke Olabisi	Indiana Alpha, 1968	chemical engineer and CEO of Infra-Tech Consulting LLC	
Frederick Rossini	Pennsylvania Gamma, 1925	chemical engineer and thermodynamicist for the National Bureau of Standards	
Waldo Semon	Washington Alpha, 1920	chemical engineer with B.F. Goodrich who invented synthetic rubber	
John H. Sinfelt	Pennsylvania Beta, 1951	chemical engineer with Standard Oil Development Company whose work led to the introduction of unleaded gasoline	
John Robert Suman	California Alpha, 1912	geologist, petroleum engineer, and business executive	

=== Civil engineering ===
Name	Chapter and date	Notability	Ref.
Othmar Ammann	New York Epsilon, 1902	civil and structural engineer who designed the George Washington Bridge, Verrazzano–Narrows Bridge, and Bayonne Bridge	
James Amrhein		civil engineer and structural engineer who was the executive director of the Masonry Institute of America	
Rodney Bagley	Utah Alpha, 1959	ceramic engineer with Corning Inc. who co-invented the catalytic converter	
Lynn S. Beedle	California Alpha, 1941	structural engineer known for his design and building of skyscrapers; founder and the director of the Council on Tall Buildings and Urban Habitat	
Octave Chanute	Illinois Alpha,1905	civil engineer and aviation pioneer	
Charles Alton Ellis	Indiana Alpha, 1900	structural engineer who was chiefly responsible for the structural design of the Golden Gate Bridge	
Irwin Lachman	New Jersey Beta, 1952	ceramic engineer with Corning Inc. who co-invented the catalytic converter	
Franklin Matthias		civil engineer and nuclear engineer who directed the construction of the Hanford nuclear site	
Ralph Modjeski	Illinois Alpha, 1885	civil engineer who achieved prominence as "America's greatest bridge builder"	
William Barclay Parsons	New York Alpha, 1934	civil engineer who founded Parsons Brinckerhoff	
Ralph Brazelton Peck	New York Gamma, 1934	civil engineer specializing in soil mechanics, who designed and built major dams	
John L. Savage	Wisconsin Alpha, 1903	civil engineer who supervised the designs for sixty dams, including Hoover Dam, Grand Coulee Dam, and Three Gorges Dam	
Dean Sicking	Texas Delta, 1980	civil and mechanical engineer who invented roadside and racetrack safety technologies	
Ole Singstad	New York Epsilon, 1905	civil engineer who designed the Holland Tunnel, Lincoln Tunnel, Brooklyn–Battery Tunnel, and Queens–Midtown Tunnel	
David B. Steinman	New York Alpha, 1906	civil engineer who designed the Mackinac Bridge	
Joseph Strauss	Ohio Beta, 1892	chief structural engineer of the Golden Gate Bridge	
Arthur Newell Talbot	Illinois Alpha, 1881	civil engineer who was a pioneer in the field of reinforced concrete	
George Tamaro	New York Xi, 1959	civil engineer credited with stabilizing the foundation of the World Trade Center	

=== Electrical engineering ===
Name	Chapter and date	Notability	Ref.
Andrew Alford	Massachusetts Epsilon, 1924	electrical engineer who invented a localizer antenna system	
Edwin Howard Armstrong	New York Alpha, 1913	electrical engineer and inventor who developed FM (frequency modulation) radio	
Harry D. Belock		sound engineer and inventor	
James R. Biard		electrical engineer and inventor who held 73 U.S. patents	
Donald Bitzer	Illinois Alpha, 1955	electrical engineer and co-inventor of the plasma display	
Harold Stephen Black	Massachusetts Alpha, 1921	electrical engineer with Bell Labs who invented the negative feedback amplifier	
William E. Bradley Jr.	Pennsylvania Delta	engineer with Philco and the Institute for Defense Analyses	
Marvin Camras	Illinois Beta, 1940	electrical engineer who was influential in the field of magnetic recording	
Alfred Y. Cho	Illinois Alpha, 1960	electrical engineer, optical engineer, and the adjunct vice president of semiconductor research at Bell Labs	
Lewis Warrington Chubb	Ohio Gamma, 1905	electrical engineer and director of the Westinghouse Electric Corporation's research laboratory	
Nathan Cohn		electrical engineer who worked for Leeds & Northrup	
Lee de Forest	Connecticut Alpha, 1896	electrical engineer and an early pioneer in electronics	
Tomas Dy-Liacco		an electrical engineer often referred to as the father of modern energy control centers	
Richard H. Frenkiel	Massachusetts Delta, 1963	telecommunications engineer with Bell Labs and AT&T known for the development of cellular telephone networks	
Bernard Marshall Gordon	Massachusetts Beta, 1948	electrical engineer with Eckert-Mauchly Computer Corporation, who developed the input/output circuits of the first commercial computer UNIVAC	
Wilson Greatbatch	New York Delta, 1950	electrical engineer and pioneering inventor	
Robert N. Hall	California Beta, 1942	engineer with General Electric who demonstrated the first semiconductor laser	
George H. Heilmeier	Pennsylvania Delta, 1958	electrical engineer and pioneering contributor to liquid crystal displays	
Clarence Floyd Hirshfeld	California Alpha, 1902	electrical, mechanical, and consulting engineer who was the chief of research for the Detroit Edison Company	
Joseph M. Juran	New York Epsilon, 1924	electrical engineer for Hawthorne Works and chief industrial engineer with Western Electric/AT&T's headquarters	
Rudolf E. Kálmán	Massachusetts Beta, 1953	electrical engineer, mathematician, and inventor	
Ashok Krishnamoorthy	California Beta, 1986	electrical engineer with Oracle Labs	
Bernard J. Lechner		electronics engineer and vice president of RCA Laboratories	
Clarence Hugo Linder	Indiana Alpha, 1924	electrical engineer and vice president of General Electric and the first president of the National Academy of Engineering	
George Lof	Colorado Beta, 1935	engineer known for solar energy research	
Robert W. Lucky	Indiana Alpha, 1957	electrical engineer, inventor, and research manager at Bell Labs and Bell Communications Research	
James Ross MacDonald		electrical engineer and physicist for Texas Instruments	
John L. Moll	Ohio Gamma, 1943	electrical engineer, notable for his contributions to solid-state physics	
Robert Moog	New York Alpha, 1957	engineer, electronic music pioneer, and the inventor of the first commercial synthesizer	
Harry F. Olson	Iowa Beta, 1924	engineer and inventor with RCA Victor and the acoustic research director of RCA Laboratories	
Edmund Prentis		engineer and co-founder of the engineering firm Spencer, White & Prentis	
Dalton Pritchard		electrical engineer and color television pioneer, working at RCA Laboratories	
Mihajlo Pupin	New York Alpha, 1883	electrical engineer, physicist, and inventor	
Simon Ramo	Utah Alpha, 1933	engineer who developed General Electric's electron microscope, often called the father of the intercontinental ballistic missile	
Walter Robb	Pennsylvania Beta, 1948	electrical engineer; research and development executive for General Electric	
Steven Sasson	New York Gamma, 1972	electrical engineer with Kodak who invented the portable digital camera	
Daniel R. von Recklinghausen	Massachusetts Beta	electrical engineer	
Harold Alden Wheeler		electrical engineer with Hazeltine Corporation	
Vladimir K. Zworykin	Pennsylvania Delta, 1912	inventor, engineer, and pioneer of television technology	

=== Mechanical engineering ===
Name	Chapter and date	Notability	Ref.
Donald E. Bently	Iowa Beta, 1949	mechanical engineer and founder, president, and CEO of Bently Nevada	
Omer Blodgett	Minnesota Alpha, 1941	mechanical engineer and design consultant for Lincoln Electric and Globe Shipbuilding Company	
William D. Bond	Iowa Alpha	mechanical engineer with General Motors	
Frank Cepollina	California Zeta, 1959	mechanical engineer with NASA, associated with the Hubble Space Telescope.	
Maxime Faget	Louisiana Alpha, 1943	mechanical engineer with NASA who designed the Mercury spacecraft, and contributed to the Gemini and Apollo spacecraft, and the Space Shuttle.	
John Fritz	Pennsylvania Alpha, 1895	general superintendent, and chief engineer of the Bethlehem Iron Works	
Robert Kearns	Michigan Delta, 1952	mechanical engineer who invented the intermittent windshield wiper for automobiles	
Jacob Rabinow	New York Eta, 1948	mechanical engineer and chief of the Electro-Mechanical Ordnance Division at the National Bureau of Standards	
Edward Schildhauer		chief mechanical and electrical engineer on the Panama Canal project	
Virginia Sink	Colorado Beta, 2019	first woman automotive engineer at Chrysler	
John Edson Sweet	New York Beta, 1909	mechanical engineer, inventor, and founder and president of the American Society of Mechanical Engineers	

== Entertainment ==
Name	Chapter and date	Notability	Ref.
Frank Capra	California Beta, 1918	movie director	
John M. Eargle		Oscar and Grammy-winning audio engineer and musician	
Wendell Wise Mayes Jr.	Texas Beta	radio and cable television editorialist and executive	
Arthur Nielsen	Wisconsin Alpha, 1918	founder of the A.C. Nielsen Company who created and tracked the Nielsen ratings for television	
Mark Rober	Utah Beta, 2004	science-edutainment YouTuber	
Tom Scholz	Massachusetts Beta, 1969	lead guitarist of Boston	

== Government ==
Name	Chapter and date	Notability	Ref.
Arden L. Bement Jr.	Colorado Alpha, 1954	undersecretary of defense for research and engineering	
James Boyd	Colorado Alpha	8th director of the United States Bureau of Mines	
Vannevar Bush	Massachusetts Beta, 1916	first director of the National Science Foundation	
William Colglazier	California Beta, 1966	executive officer of the National Academy of Sciences and National Academies of Sciences; Science and Technology Adviser to the Secretary of State	
Edward E. David Jr.	Georgia Alpha, 1945	director of the White House Office of Science and Technology	
John M. Deutch	Massachusetts Beta, 1961	Director of the Central Intelligence Agency; undersecretary and director of energy research for the US. Department of Energy; and Undersecretary of Defense	
Delores M. Etter	New Mexico Beta, 1979	Assistant Secretary of the Navy and deputy undersecretary of Defense for Science & Technology	
Mary L. Good	South Carolina Gamma, 1950	Undersecretary of Commerce for technology	
John Hays Hammond	Maryland Beta, 1930	chairman of the Federal Coal Commission, oilman, mining engineer, and general manager of the Guggenheim Exploration Company (Guggenex)	
Sterling B. Hendricks	Arkansas Alpha, 1922	chief scientist of the Mineral Nutrition Engineering Research Laboratory of the United States Department of Agriculture	
Paul G. Kaminski	Massachusetts Beta, 1966	Under Secretary of Defense for Acquisition and Technology	
Steven E. Koonin	California Beta, 1972	undersecretary for science at the U.S. Department of Energy	
Donald Latham	South Carolina Gamma, 1955	United States Assistant Secretary of Defense and deputy secretary of defense	
Lindsay D. Norman	Montana Beta, 1960	director of the United States Bureau of Mines and president of Montana Technological University and Massachusetts Bay Community College	
John A. McCone	California Alpha, 1922	Director of the Central Intelligence Agency and chairman of the United States Atomic Energy Commission	
Lindsay D. Norman	Montana Beta, 1960	director of the U.S. Bureau of Mines and president of Montana Technical Institute and Massachusetts Bay Community College	
John Ofori-Tenkorang		director general of Social Security and National Insurance Trust in Ghana	
James W. Plummer	California Alpha, 1942	Director of the National Reconnaissance Office	
James R. Powell	Pennsylvania Gamma, 1967	senior nuclear engineer at the Brookhaven National Laboratory	
Arati Prabhaker	Texas Beta, 1979	director of the National Institute of Standards and Technology and director of the White House Office of Science and Technology Policy	
John Brooks Slaughter	Washington Beta, 1956	director of the National Science Foundation, chancellor of the University of Maryland, College Park, and president of Occidental College	
Harold Palmer Smith Jr.	Massachusetts Beta, 1957	Assistant to the Secretary of Defense (Atomic Energy) and Assistant Secretary of Defense for Nuclear, Chemical & Biological Defense Programs	
John P. Stenbit		Assistant Secretary of Defense (Networks and Information Integration) and Assistant Secretary of Defense for Command, Control, Communications and Intelligence	
Guyford Stever	Massachusetts Beta, 1938	director of the National Science Foundation, director of the Office of Science and Technology Policy, and president of Carnegie Mellon University	
Samuel Wesley Stratton	Illinois Alpha, 1884	1st Director of the National Bureau of Standards and president of the Massachusetts Institute of Technology	
Peter B. Teets	Colorado Beta, 1963	director of the National Reconnaissance Office and Undersecretary of the United States Air Force	
Michael Telson	Massachusetts Beta, 1967	chief financial officer for the U. S. Department of Energy; engineer with the Federation of American Scientists	
Alvin Trivelpiece		director of the Office of Energy Research of the U.S. Department of Energy and director of Oak Ridge National Laboratory	
Lal Chand Verman	Michigan Gamma, 1926	director-general of the Indian Standards Institution	
Linton Wells II	Maryland Alpha, 1975	Principal Deputy Assistant Secretary of Defense	

== Law ==
Name	Chapter and date	Notability	Ref.
J. Campbell Barker	Texas Delta	judge of the United States District Court for the Eastern District of Texas	
Raymond T. Chen	California Epsilon	judge of the United States Court of Appeals for the Federal Circuit	
Tiffany P. Cunningham		judge of the United States Court of Appeals for the Federal Circuit	
Paul Grewal	Massachusetts Beta	vice president and deputy general counsel at Facebook and judge of the United States District Court for the Northern District of California	
Kenneth W. Mack	Pennsylvania Zeta, 1986	professor of law at Harvard Law School	

== Literature and journalism ==
Name	Chapter and date	Notability	Ref.
William Raimond Baird		publisher and editor	
José Luis Cordeiro		author and futurist	
Bradley Efron	California Beta, 1960	statistician; past editor of the Journal of the American Statistical Association and the founding editor of the Annals of Applied Statistics	
Samuel C. Florman	New York Alpha, 1944	author of books about engineering, technology, and general culture	
John R. Pierce	California Beta, 1933	science fiction novelist and pioneer in the design of communications satellites	

== Medicine and life sciences ==
Name	Chapter and date	Notability	Ref.
Michael L. Brodman	1974	professor and chairman of the Department of Obstetrics, Gynecology and Reproductive Science at Mount Sinai Hospital, New York, Mount Sinai Health System, and Icahn School of Medicine at Mount Sinai	
Leslie A. Geddes	Texas Delta, 1945	electrical engineer and physiologist who specialized in medical devices; professor of physiology at Baylor University; and director of the Division of Biomedical Engineering and director of Engineering at Purdue University	
Augustus Braun Kinzel	Maryland Beta, 1919	president and CEO of the Salk Institute for Biological Studies; the first president of the National Academy of Engineering	
Laurence Monroe Klauber	California Gamma, 1908	first curator of reptiles and amphibians at the San Diego Natural History Museum	
Raphael Carl Lee	Pennsylvania Zeta, 1975	reconstructive surgeon, biomedical engineer, and professor emeritus at the University of Chicago	
Richard Pough	Missouri Gamma, 1925	chair of the Department of Conservation and General Ecology at the American Museum of Natural History and the founding president of The Nature Conservancy	
George Stouffer	Pennsylvania Eta	cardiologist and chief of the Division of Cardiology at the University of North Carolina Medical Center	
Anand Veeravagu	Maryland Alpha, 2005	neurosurgeon at Stanford University Hospital and Clinic	
Augustin Luna	Georgia Alpha, 2005	bioinformatician at United States National Library of Medicine	

== Military ==
Name	Chapter and date	Notability	Ref.
Joseph A. Ahearn	South Carolina Gamma, 1958	United States Air Force general	
Algert Alexis	Pennsylvania Epsilon, 1919	United States Navy Rear Admiral	
John C. Arrowsmith	Ohio Alpha, 1917	United States Army Brigadier General	
Norman R. Augustine	New Jersey Delta, 1957	United States Under Secretary of the Army	
Joe N. Ballard	District of Columbia Alpha, 1965	United States Army general	
Gladeon M. Barnes	Michigan Gamma, 1910	United States Army major general	
Frank O. Bowman	Alabama Alpha, 1918	United States Army major general	
Jay R. Brill	Indiana Alpha, 1952	United States Air Force Brigadier General and Deputy Undersecretary of Energy	
Thomas L. Brown II	Maryland Alpha	United States Navy officer	
William F. Cassidy	Texas Delta, 1931	United States Army lieutenant general	
Bruce C. Clarke	Tennessee Alpha, 1925	United States Army general	
Frederick J. Clarke	Texas Delta, 1937	United States Army lieutenant general	
Wat Tyler Cluverius Jr.	Massachusetts Alpha, 1896	United States Navy rear admiral and president of Worcester Polytechnic Institute	
Lewis Combs	New York Gamma, 1916	United States Navy Rear Admiral	
Albert Scott Crossfield	Washington Alpha, 1949	United States Navy officer and test pilot; first pilot to fly at twice the speed of sound	
Ralph Earle	Massachusetts Alpha, 1896	United States Navy rear admiral and president of the Worcester Polytechnic Institute	
Thomas Farrell	New York Gamma, 1912	United States Army major general and Deputy Commanding General and Chief of Field Operations of the Manhattan Project	
Robert H. Foglesong	West Virginia Alpha, 1968	United States Air Force major general	
S. Taco Gilbert III	Colorado Zeta, 1978	United States Air Force general	
George Washington Goethals	Michigan Gamma, 1880	United States Army major general	
Robert C. Gooding	South Carolina Gamma, 1941	United States Navy Vice Admiral	
Gordon M. Graham	California Alpha, 1940	United States Air Force general and World War II flying ace	
Jackson Graham	Oregon Alpha, 1936	United States Army Corps of Engineers major general and first general manager of the Washington Metropolitan Area Transit Authority	
William C. Gribble Jr.	Michigan Beta, 1938	United States Army lieutenant general	
Charles P. Gross	New York Delta, 1910	United States Army major general	
Irvin Hale	Colorado Beta, 1884	United States Army brigadier general	
Henry J. Hatch	Tennessee Alpha, 1957	United States Army lieutenant general	
Monroe W. Hatch Jr.	Oklahoma Alpha	United States Air Force general and former Vice Chief of Staff of the United States Air Force	
Elvin R. Heiberg III	South Carolina Gamma, 1953	United States Army lieutenant general	
Robert T. Herres	Ohio Eta, 1960	United States Air Force brigadier general	
John R. Hodge	Illinois Alpha, 1918	United States Army major general	
Ephraim F. Jeffe	New York Zeta, 1916	United States Army Brigadier General	
J. William Kime	Massachusetts Beta, 1964	United States Coast Guard commandant	
William W. Lapsley	South Carolina Gamma, 1935	United States Army major general	
Curtis LeMay	Ohio Gamma, 1932	United States Air Force general	
Carroll LeTellier	South Carolina Gamma, 1949	United States Army major general	
Alvin Luedecke	Texas Delta, 1937	United States Air Force major general	
John L. Martin Jr.	New York Zeta, 1948	United States Air Force major general	
Clarence E. McKnight Jr.	South Carolina Gamma, 1952	United States Army lieutenant general	
Benjamin F. Montoya	New York Gamma, 1960	United States Navy Rear Admiral	
Brad Mooney	South Carolina Gamma, 1953	United States Navy Rear Admiral	
Ben Moreell	Missouri Gamma, 1913	United States Navy admiral	
Armand M. Morgan	Massachusetts Beta, 1924	United States Navy admiral	
John W. Morris	Iowa Beta, 1943	United States Army lieutenant general	
Bradford Parkinson	Massachusetts Beta, 1961	United States Air Force colonel; professor and deputy head of the United States Air Force Academy Department of Astronautics and Computer Science; lead architect of the USAF NAVSTAR program	
Floyd Lavinius Parks	South Carolina Alpha, 1918	United States Army Brigadier General	
Ellen M. Pawlikowski	New Jersey Gamma, 1978	United States Air Force general and commander	
David E. Pergrin	Pennsylvania Beta	commanding officer of the 291st Engineer Combat Battalion during World War II	
Lewis A. Pick	Texas Delta, 1914	United States Army lieutenant general	
Ronald J. Rábago	Michigan Gamma, 1985	United States Coast Guard rear admiral	
Thomas R. Sargent III	New York Gamma, 1952	United States Coast Guard vice commandant	
Bernard Schriever	Arizona Beta, 1931	United States Air Force general	
Ellie G. Shuler Jr.	South Carolina Gamma, 1959	United States Air Force lieutenant general	
J. Edward Snyder	South Carolina Gamma, 1944	United States Navy Rear Admiral	
Carl A. Strock	Virginia Delta, 1970	United States Army general	
Jeffrey W. Talley	Indiana Gamma, 1995	Army Reserve chief and Commanding General of the U.S. Army Reserve Command	
William G. Thrash	Georgia Alpha, 1939	United States Marine Corps general	
Maxwell R. Thurman	North Carolina Alpha, 1953	United States Army general	
Edward Uhl	Pennsylvania Alpha, 1940	United States Army Ordnance Corps officer who developed the bazooka	
William J. Van Ryzin	Wisconsin Alpha, 1935	United States Marine Corps lieutenant general	
Robert Wertheim	South Carolina Gamma, 1945	United States Navy rear admiral (upper half)	
Shelia Widnall	Massachusetts Beta, 1960	United States Secretary of the Air Force	

== Nobel laureates ==
Name	Chapter and date	Notability	Ref.
Carl David Anderson	California Beta, 1927	physicist who shared the 1936 Nobel Prize in Physics for his discovery of the positron	
Frances Arnold	New Jersey Delta, 1979	professor of chemical engineering, bioengineering, and biochemistry at the California Institute of Technology who received the 2018 Nobel Prize in Chemistry	
John Bardeen	Wisconsin Alpha, 1928	professor at the University of Illinois and co-winner of the Nobel Prize in Physics in 1956 and 1972	
Melvin Calvin	Michigan Beta, 1931	biochemist at the University of California, Berkeley who shared the 1961 Nobel Prize in Chemistry for discovering the Calvin cycle	
William Alfred Fowler	Ohio Gamma, 1933	nuclear physicist and astrophysicist, who share the 1983 Nobel Prize in Physics	
Ivar Giaever	New York Theta, 1952	physicist who shared the 1973 Nobel Prize in Physics	
Donald A. Glaser	Ohio Alpha, 1946	professor of physics at the University of California, Berkeley and winner of the 1960 Nobel Prize in Physics for his invention of the bubble chamber	
John L. Hall	Pennsylvania Gamma, 1956	physicist who shared the 2005 Nobel Prize in Physics for his work in precision spectroscopy	
Jack Kilby	Illinois Alpha, 1947	electrical engineer with Texas Instruments who was awarded the 2000 Nobel Prize in Physics	
Irving Langmuir	New York Alpha, 1903	chemist, physicist, and metallurgical engineer who was awarded the Nobel Prize in Chemistry in 1932 for his work in surface chemistry	
Paul Lauterbur	Illinois Alpha, 1951	chemist and professor at Stony Brook University who shared the Nobel Prize in Physiology or Medicine in 2003	
Edwin McMillan	California Beta, 1928	physicist who shared the 1951 Nobel Prize in Chemistry for being the first to produce a transuranium element, neptunium	
Robert Andrews Millikan	California Beta, 1891	president of the California Institute of Technology and physicist who received the Nobel Prize in Physics in 1923	
William E. Moerner	Missouri Gamma, 1975	physical chemist and chemical physicist who was awarded the Nobel Prize in Chemistry in 2014	
Kary Mullis	Georgia Alpha, 1966	biochemist who shared the 1983 Nobel Prize in Chemistry	
Linus Pauling	Ohio Alpha, 1946	professor at California Institute of Technology and winner of the Nobel Prize in Chemistry in 1954 and the Nobel Peace Prize in 1962	
Martin Lewis Perl	New York Zeta, 1948	chemical engineer and physicist who won the Nobel Prize in Physics in 1995 for his discovery of the tau lepton	
Edward Mills Purcell	Indiana Alpha, 1933	physicist who shared the 1952 Nobel Prize for Physics for his discovery of nuclear magnetic resonance in liquids and in solids	
Frederick Reines	New Jersey Alpha, 1939	physicist who shared the 1995 Nobel Prize in Physics for the neutrino	
William Shockley	California Beta, 1932	professor of electrical engineering at Stanford University and manager of a research group at Bell Labs that won the 1956 Nobel Prize in Physics	
Clifford Shull	Pennsylvania Gamma, 1937	physicist who shared the 1994 Nobel Prize in Physics for the development of the neutron scattering technique	
Samuel C. C. Ting	Michigan Gamma, 1959	physicist who shared the Nobel Prize in Physics in 1976 for discovering the subatomic J/ψ particle	
Rosalyn Sussman Yalow	New York Iota, 1941	medical physicist and a co-winner of the 1977 Nobel Prize in Physiology or Medicine	

== Politics ==
=== United States Senate ===
Name	Chapter and date	Notability	Ref.
Steven Daines	Montana Alpha, 1984	United States Senate and United States House of Representatives	
Ralph Flanders	Massachusetts Beta, 1939	United States Senate	
James G. Scrugham	Kentucky Alpha, 1900	United States Senate, United States House of Representatives, and Governor of Nevada	

=== United States House ===
Name	Chapter and date	Notability	Ref.
LeRoy H. Anderson	Montana Alpha, 1927	United States House of Representatives	
Joe Barton	Texas Delta, 1972	United States House of Representatives	
Charles L. Faust	Missouri Gamma, 1930	United States House of Representatives	
Dan Lipinski	Illinois Gamma, 1988	United States House of Representatives	
Bill Luther	Minnesota Alpha, 1967	United States House of Representatives	
Thomas Massie	Massachusetts Beta, 1993	United States House of Representatives	
Archibald E. Olpp	Pennsylvania Alpha, 1903	United States House of Representatives	
Lewis F. Payne Jr.	Virginia Delta, 1967	United States House of Representatives	
Donald L. Ritter	Pennsylvania Alpha, 1961	United States House of Representatives	
Joe Skeen	New Mexico Alpha, 1950	United States House of Representatives	
Weston E. Vivian	New York Mu, 1945	United States House of Representatives	

=== United States Cabinet ===
Name	Chapter and date	Notability	Ref.
Samuel Bodman	New York Delta, 1961	United States Secretary of Energy, United States Secretary of Treasury, and CEO and president of the Cabot Corporation	
D. Allen Bromley	Connecticut Alpha, 1948	assistant to President George H. W. Bush for science and technology	
Herbert Hoover Jr.	Kansas Alpha, 1925	United States Under Secretary of State	
Lisa P. Jackson	Louisiana Beta, 1983	Administrator of the Environmental Protection Agency	
W. Kenneth Davis	California Alpha, 1940	United States Deputy Secretary of Energy	
Frederick H. Mueller	Michigan Alpha, 1914	United States Secretary of Commerce	
Charles Erwin Wilson	Pennsylvania Gamma, 1909	United States Secretary of Defense	

=== Governors ===
Name	Chapter and date	Notability	Ref.
Bill Clements	Texas Iota, 1985	Governor of Texas and United States Deputy Secretary of Defense	
Daniel J. Evans	Washington Alpha, 1948	Governor of Washington, United States Senate, United States House of Representatives, and president of Evergreen State College	
Luis A. Ferre	Puerto Rico Alpha, 1924	Governor of Puerto Rico	
Ernie Fletcher	Kentucky Alpha, 1974	Governor of Kentucky, United States House of Representatives, and Kentucky House of Representatives	
Kirk Fordice	Indiana Alpha, 1956	Governor of Mississippi	
Greg Gianforte	New Jersey Alpha, 1983	Governor of Montana and United States House of Representatives	
Fob James	Alabama Alpha, 1955	Governor of Alabama	
Joseph B. Johnson	Vermont Alpha, 1915	Governor of Vermont, Lieutenant Governor of Vermont, Vermont Senate, and Vermont House of Representatives	
Walter Philip Leber		governor of the Panama Canal Zone	
Paul E. Patton	Kentucky Alpha, 1959	Governor of Kentucky and president of University of Pikeville	
Milton Shapp	Ohio Alpha, 1933	Governor of Pennsylvania	
John H. Sununu	Massachusetts Delta, 1961	Governor of New Hampshire and White House Chief of Staff	
Roberto Sánchez Vilella	Ohio Gamma, 1934	Governor of Puerto Rico and Secretary of State of Puerto Rico	
John A. Volpe	Massachusetts Delta, 1930	Governor of Massachusetts, United States Secretary of Transportation, and United States Ambassador to Italy	

=== Diplomats ===
Name	Chapter and date	Notability	Ref.
Alton G. Keel Jr	Virginia Alpha, 1966	United States Permanent Representative to NATO and Assistant Secretary of the Air Force (Acquisition)	

=== State and local politicians ===
Name	Chapter and date	Notability	Ref.
Michael Bloomberg	Maryland Alpha, 1964	Mayor of New York City and founder of Bloomberg L.P.	
Thomas H. Cormen		New Hampshire House of Representatives; professor and chairman of the Dartmouth College Department of Computer Science	
Kenneth A. Gibson	New Jersey Gamma, 1963	mayor of Newark, New Jersey	
Francis X. Hurley	Pennsylvania Beta, 1963	Massachusetts Auditor and Treasurer and Receiver-General of Massachusetts	
Walter C. Sadler		Mayor of Ann Arbor, Michigan	
Allen Simmons		West Virginia House of Delegates	
Raymond Tucker	Missouri Gamma, 1920	Mayor of St. Louis	

=== Non-United States politicians ===
Name	Chapter and date	Notability	Ref.
Rodolfo Beltrán Bravo	Texas Delta	Minister of the Presidency of Peru	
Fred Aghogho Brume	Maine Alpha	Senator of Nigeria	
Leon Cordero		President of Ecuador	
Gelasio Caetani	New York Alpha, 1901	Italian Ambassador to the United States, Mayor of Rome, and delegate to Paris Peace Conference	
Khương Hữu Điểu		South Vietnam Minister of Commerce and Deputy Minister of Commerce	

== Technology and computer science ==
Name	Chapter and date	Notability	Ref.
Omolabake Adenle		founder and CEO of AJA.LA software company	
Donna Auguste	Colorado Beta	co-founder and CEO of Freshwater Software; senior engineering manager at Apple Computer	
Charles Bachman	Michigan Alpha, 1948	computer scientist and database technology pioneer	
Ralph Bernstein		digital imaging and remote sensing engineer with IBM, Landsat Earth, the Electric Power Research Institute, and the Planetary Data System	
Chester Carlson	California Beta, 1930	inventor of electrophotography made famous by Xerox	
Seymour Cray	Minnesota Alpha, 1949	supercomputer architect	
Mark Dean	Tennessee Alpha, 1979	inventor and computer engineer	
David DiLaura		pioneer in lighting calculation software	
Douglas Engelbart	Oregon Alpha, 1948	engineer and inventor known for his work on founding the field of human–computer interaction	
David Filo	Louisiana Beta, 1988	co-founder of Yahoo	
Marcian Hoff	New York Gamma, 1958	one of the inventors of the microprocessor	
Douglas W. Jones	Illinois Alpha, 1980	computer scientist at the University of Iowa	
Robert Kahn	New York Eta, 1960	computer scientist who proposed the Transmission Control Protocol and the Internet Protocol	
Leonard Kleinrock	Massachusetts Beta, 1962	computer scientist and Internet pioneer	
Donald Knuth	Ohio Alpha, 1960	computer scientist and mathematician	
Omid Kordestani	California Eta, 1984	executive chairman of Twitter; senior vice president and chief business officer of Google; and a director of Vodafone	
Sanjay Mehrotra	California Alpha, 1978	co-founder, president and CEO of SanDisk; CEO of Micron Technology	
Bill Mensch	Arizona Alpha, 1971	co-designer of the Motorola 6800 and MOS Technology 6502; founder, chairman, and CEO of the Western Design Center	
Robert Metcalfe	Massachusetts Beta, 1968	co-inventor of Ethernet and co-founded 3Com	
Cleve Moler	California Beta, 1961	one of the authors of LINPACK, EISPACK, Fortran; creator of MATLAB; and co-founder of MathWorks	
Ken Oshman	Texas Gamma, 1963	Silicon Valley pioneer, co-founder of ROLM, and president and CEO of Echelon Corporation	
Joe Ossanna		software designer and computer programmer at the Bell Telephone Laboratories	
Larry Page	Michigan Gamma, 1995	co-founder of Google	
Roger S. Pressman		software engineer	
Claude Shannon	Michigan Gamma, 1936	computer scientist, cryptographer, and inventor known as the "father of information theory" and as the "father of the Information Age"	
Clara Shih	California Gamma, 2005	co-founder and CEO of Hearsay Social	
W. David Sincoskie		computer engineer who installed the first Ethernet local area network at Bellcore	
Wayne Stevens		software engineer for IBM	
Ivan Sutherland	Pennsylvania Gamma, 1959	computer scientist and Internet pioneer	
Ray Tomlinson	New York Gamma, 1963	computer programmer who implemented the first email program on the ARPANET system	
Steve Wallach		computer engineer and co-founder of Convex Computer	
Willis Ware		computer scientist with RAND Corporation who co-developed the IAS machine	
Jerry Yang	California Gamma, 1990	founder and CEO of Yahoo	

== Sports ==
Name	Chapter and year	Notability	Ref.
Raúl Allegre	Texas Alpha, 1984	professional football player	
Charles Armstrong	Indiana Alpha, 1964	president of the Seattle Mariners Major League Baseball club	
Percy Beard	Alabama Alpha, 1929	Olympic silver medalist for track and field	
Ed Bock	Iowa Alpha, 1938	college football player	
Joe Bottom	California Delta	competitive swimmer and Olympic silver medalist	
Avery Brundage	Illinois Alpha, 1909	president of the International Olympic Committee	
Britton Chance	Pennsylvania Delta, 1935	1952 Summer Olympics gold medalist for sailing; academic considered the founder of biomedical photonics	
David Clark	New York Delta, 1982	silver medalist in the men's coxless four at the 1984 Summer Olympics	
Lynn Colella	Washington Alpha, 1972	silver medalist for swimming in the 1972 Summer Olympics	
Bill Darnton	Michigan Gamma	swimmer in the 1960 Summer Olympics	
Joseph H. Deckman	Maryland Beta	lacrosse player and coach	
Rick Dennison	Colorado Delta, 1979	professional football player and coach	
Nathan Dougherty	New York Delta, 1913	Hall of Fame college football player; chairman of the Athletic Council and dean of the College of Engineering at the University of Tennessee	
Adnan Gabeljic	Missouri Epsilon, 2014	professional soccer player	
Ellis Gardner	Georgia Alpha, 1983	professional football player	
John Garrels	Michigan Gamma	winner of the silver medal in the men's 110 metres hurdles and a bronze medal in the shot put at the 1908 Summer Olympics	
Paul G. Goebel		professional football player	
Brian Gyetko	Arizona Beta	professional tennis player	
Harry Hawkins		college football player and first-team All-American; the national champion in the hammer throw in 1926	
Stefan Humphries	Michigan Gamma, 1984	professional football player	
Bryan Jacob	Georgia Alpha, 1993	weightlifter who competed at the 1992 and 1996 Summer Olympics	
Tom Kelly	New York Epsilon, 1948	professional basketball player	
Bill Koch	Massachusetts Beta, 1962	winner of the America's Cup in 1992	
Brent Lang	Michigan Gamma, 1990	competitive swimmer and Olympic gold medalist	
Lloyd Madden	Colorado Alpha, 1941	professional football player	
Rikke Møller Pedersen	Arizona Gamma, 1999	competitive swimmer specializing in breaststroke	
Bill Pritula	Michigan Gamma	college football player and coach	
Aron Ralston	Pennsylvania Gamma, 1997	mountaineer, mechanical engineer, and motivational speaker	
Tim Ruddy	Indiana Gamma, 1994	professional football player	
Elmer Sleight	Indiana Alpha, 1930	All-American college football player	
Donald Spero	New York Delta	former U.S. and world champion rower who competed at the 1964 Summer Olympics	
Ward Van Orman	Ohio Alpha, 1917	balloonist who won five National Balloon Races	
Jeffrey Vinik	North Carolina Gamma, 1981	majority owner of the Tampa Bay Lightning and a minority owner of the Boston Red Sox	
Herbert Voelcker	Massachusetts Beta, 1951	sports shooter and Olympian	
Waldo Wegner	Iowa Alpha, 1935	All-American college basketball player	
Bob Wiese	Michigan Gamma	professional football player	
Bill Zapalac	Texas Alpha, 1972	professional football player	

== See also ==
- List of Tau Beta Pi chapters
