= Omolabake Adenle =

Nigerian engineer

- Born: United States
- Education: Ph.D. in Bayesian Signal Processing, University of Cambridge
- Occupations: Engineer; Entrepreneur; Financial strategist
- Known for: Founder of AJA.LA Studios; SpeakYoruba App
- Awards: DEI in Voice Award, Women In Voice (2021); Shortlisted, Innovation Prize for Africa (2017)

Omolabake Adenle is a Nigerian-American engineer, entrepreneur and financial strategist. She is the founder and chief executive officer (CEO) of AJA.LA Studios, a company that provides digital solutions to natural African languages. Adenle invented the application software "SpeakYoruba App" which won her an award on Diversity, Equity and Inclusion (DEI) in Voice by the Women In Voice (WiN) 2021 and was shortlisted for the African Innovation Foundation's Innovation Prize for Africa (IPA) awards 2017. Omolabake Adenle holds a Ph.D. in engineering from University of Cambridge, UK.

== Early life and education ==
Adenle was born and brought up in the United States.

Adenle studies Ph.D. in Bayesian Signal Processing from Cambridge University where she was a National Science Foundation Graduate Research Fellow and Tau Beta Pi Honors Fellow.

== Career ==
After completing her studies, Adenle worked for Morgan Stanley as their vice president for quantitative and derivative strategies while personally working on building African language-learning application software, this exposed her in the field of natural language processing for African and other low resourced languages. She then later started the AJA.LA Studios, a company that develops natural language & speech processing applications for under-resourced languages.
