= Khương Hữu Điểu =

South Vietnamese politician

President and CEO Industrial Development Center and Industrial Development Bank of South Vietnam
- In office 1964–1975

Minister of Commerce & Deputy Minister of Commerce
- In office 1966–1968

Engineer at Bechtel
- In office 1975–1987

Personal details
- Born: 7 October 1931 (age 94) Vĩnh Long, Việt Nam

Khương Hữu Điểu (born 7 October 1931) is a retired engineer who was a South Vietnamese Government ranking cabinet member and banking chief executive officer in the South Vietnam government from the mid-1950s to 1975.

== Family ==
Minister of Commerce Khương Hữu Điểu with his wife Mrs. Định Thị Bích Châu – Retirement in California, USA

Khương is a direct descendant of an aristocrat family (Khương Hữu) in Vietnam. Khương was born as a twin brother with Dr. Khương Hữu Quí, a French scientist with 3 doctorates, to Mr. & Mrs Khương Hữu Lân, a well established jeweler in the city of Mỹ Tho, VietNam. He was given to Mr. Khương Hữu Lân's younger brother Khương Hữu Phụng as an adopted son (due to Mr. and Mrs Khương Hữu Phụng' infertility situation. Khuong is married to Mrs. Đinh Thị Bích Châu for over half a century.

== Education ==
Khương attended Junio High School at College Le Myre de Vilers, Mỷ Tho, Vietnam from 1941 to 1948 and graduated with Valedictorian. During this time, there was no higher education institution available in his hometown Mỷ Tho, his parents sent Khương to a French Preparatory School – Lycée Yersin, Đà Lạt, Viêt Nam from 1948 to 1951. Khương was also awarded Honors Prize from the Parents Association of Vietnam most renowned and famous French Preparatory schools in SàiGòn: Chasseloup Laubat, Marie Curie, and Petrus Trương Vỉnh Ký.

After earning his French Baccalauréat diploma, Khương went to the United States as a foreign student exchange to attend Lafayette College in Easton, Pennsylvania from 1952 to 1956. He earned the degree of Bachelor of Science in Mechanical Engineering with Fulbright Scholar status and graduated First in class. Additionally, Khương was awarded Full Fellowship Tau Beta Pi to attend Massachusetts Institute of Technology (MIT) between 1956 and 1957. He graduated with master's degree of Sciences in Engineering. He pursued additional business studies at Columbia University School of Business in New York from 1957 to 1958. During this last year, as part of the foreign student program, Khương joined Ebasco International of New York as a Power Plan Designer – Engineer from 1957 to 1958. Between 1958 and 1961, Khương was an Assistant Operations Manager for Esso Corporation.

== Political and banking life ==
Khương returned to his homeland ViệtNam and joined VietNam Sugar Corporation as a Technical Director. He held this position from 1961 to 1964.

Khương joined Sonadezi (National Company for the Development of Industrial Estates) as a Director General between 1964 and 1967.

After the fall of the First Republic of South VietNam, Khương became the Director of Industrial Development Center and Industrial Development Bank of VietNam. He held this position from 1964 until the Fall of SàiGòn in 1975. Concurrently, under the government of Prime Minister – Air Marshal Nguyễn Cao Kỳ, Khương was the Minister of Economy (Commerce, then Industry) from 1966 to 1968.

In 1975, South Vietnam lost the war, many Vietnamese refugees immigrate to the United States. Khương settled in San Francisco, California and joined Bechtel Corporation in San Francisco as an Assistant Project Manager. He held this position until 1987.

In 1987, Khương joined MDA Engineering Inc. of Hayward, California as a Principal and Vice President until his retirement from business and professional life in 1996.

When Prime Minister Nguyễn Cao Kỳ formed a new government Khương held the position of Minister of Commerce concurrently with the position of President and CEO of Industrial Development Bank.

In 1969, Nguyễn Văn Thiệu established the 2nd Republic of South VietNam, Khương continued holding the position of President and CEO of Industrial Development Bank of South VietNam until the fall of Saigon on 30 April 1975.

Khuong represented the government of South Vietnam when speaking at many international banking and economic summits.

In 1974, prior to the end of the Vietnam War, Khuong discussed at an international forum about Vietnam's future in education. The conference was well received by thousand attendees.

During his official roles with South VietNam government, Khương did many lectures, participated as board members of various organizations as follows:

- Lecturer, Phú Thọ Technical Institute, Saigon, VietNam between 1966 and 1970.
- Lecturer, Cao Đẳng Quốc Phỏng (National Defense College) between 1966 and 1972
- Board member of Vietnam Power Company between 1969 and 1975
- Board Member & Vice President of Sicovina Textile Company between 1965 and 1975
- President of American University Alumni Association between 1968 and 1971
- Board Member & President of Vietnam-American Association between 1972 and 1975
- Founder and President of Vietnam Management Association between 1966 and 1975
- Board Member & President of Asian Productivity Organization, Japan between 1965 and 1975
- Head of Vietnam Economic Conferences in China & Korea between 1966 and 1968
- Publisher and Editor of Business Management Magazine in VietNam between 1966 and 1975
- Founder & Secretary of Vietnam Flower and Garden Association between 1966 and 1975

Khương was awarded with various medals and Honor Awards as follows:

- Chang Kai Chiak Presidential Award, Order of Rising Star
- Honor Medal from Vietnam Ministry of Economy
- Honor Medal from Vietnam Ministry of Public Works
- Honor Medal from Vietnam Ministry of Finance
- Honor Medal from South Vietnam Prime Minister

== Life in exile ==
After the defeat of South Vietnam by North Vietnam in 1975, Khương immigrated to the US and resides in California with his wife. Khương worked in Engineering profession with BelTek organization until his retirement.

During the Vietnamese refugee early settlement after the Fall of Saigon in 1975, Khuong did volunteer his time to assist the Marine Camp Pendleton management to organize and advice many families in their settlement processes in the US.

In 1998, Khương authored and published a book about Vietnam Economy and its future development. The book is The Future of Industrial Development in Vietnam.

In 2012, Khương was a speaker at a "Vietnam War – Economics & Politics" conference workshop. It was well received by thousand attendees.
