= Donald Latham =

American communications official

Donald Latham served as the United States Assistant Secretary of Defense for Communications, Command, Control under President Ronald Reagan. He later became a vice-president at Computer Sciences Corporation.
