= Alex Bekker =

Physician, author and academic

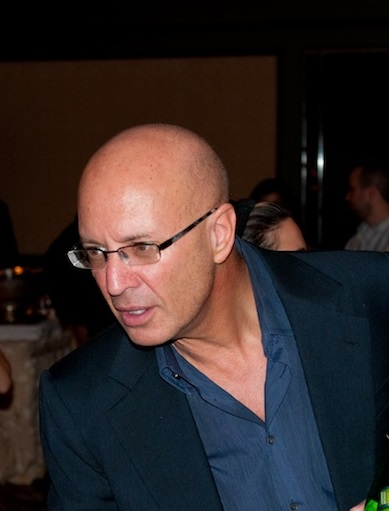
- Citizenship: United States
- Occupations: Researcher, author and academic

Academic background
- Education: B.S. (Chemistry), 1974; M.S. (Chemical Engineering), 1983; Ph.D. (Biomedical Engineering), 1987; M.D., 1991
- Alma mater: Tbilisi State University; New Jersey Institute of Technology; Rutgers New Jersey Medical School

Alex Bekker is a physician, author and academic. He is a professor and chair at the Department of Anesthesiology, Rutgers New Jersey Medical School. He is also professor at the Department of Physiology, Pharmacology & Neurosciences. He serves as the Chief of Anesthesiology Service at the University Hospital in Newark.

Bekker's research interests include clinical pharmacology, perioperative medicine, neurosciences, and medicinal applications of cannabis. His initial work was focused on techniques of separating carbon isotopes for military and medical applications. Later, his research has been in the areas of clinical pharmacology of sedatives and analgesics, understanding the effects of perioperative stress and anesthetics on cognition, particularly in the elderly, and brain protection. He is an author of more than 120 peer-reviewed publications as well as more than 200 scientific abstracts and meeting proceedings. In addition to publications in academic journals, his early work in industry led to the award of six U.S. Patents.

Bekker was awarded the Distinguished New Jersey Medical School Alumni Award in 2016.

== Early life and education ==
Bekker was born and raised in Georgia. He graduated from Tbilisi State University, Georgia, with a degree in chemistry in 1974. He began his career as a research associate at the Institute of Stable Isotopes in Tbilisi, Georgia, where he was working on the development of the novel techniques of separating carbon isotopes for medical and military applications. He received additional training in the Institute of Physical Chemistry, Moscow, from 1975 to 1977 under the mentorship of Alexander Chaikin. Bekker presented the results of his research on the mechanism of hydrogen-fluorine chain reactions at several national conferences.

After moving to the United States in 1979, he joined the Catalysis Research Corporation (CRC). His research focused on developing advanced technologies for reducing emissions associated with carbon-based fuel. In 1980–81, Bekker was a visiting scholar at Columbia University at the Renewable Energy Research Laboratory Department of Energy supported his research. In 1982, he left CRC and joined Allied Chemicals (currently Honeywell) in 1982 as a Project Engineer. During his tenure at Allied, he advanced a new process of converting heavy hydrocarbons to fuels using supercritical fluids. This work culminated in six U.S. patents and several publications.

In 1981, Bekker enrolled in the Master of Engineering Program at the New Jersey Institute of Technology, which he completed in 1984 and enrolled in the PhD program at the same institution. The focus of Bekker's research at that time was changing from chemical to biomedical engineering. His doctoral thesis, "Transient Analysis of Macromolecular Blood-Tissue Exchange in Microvascular Bed," added in the understanding of transendothelial transport of monoclonal antibodies. The NJIT Presidential Scholarship Award supported this research. The results of this work were presented at various forums and published in several publications, including one in Circulation Research.

Mathematical modeling of biological systems sparked Bekker's interest in applying engineering principles to the analysis of the effects of drugs on mammalian circulation. Practical applications of this approach required understanding of the pathophysiology of the diseases, so Bekker started his study of Medicine in 1987 and completed a four-year medical school program at the Rutgers New Jersey Medical School in 1991, which was followed by a residency training in Anesthesiology at Columbia-Presbyterian Medical Center in New York.

== Career ==
After completing his residency in 1995, Bekker was recruited for the position of assistant professor of anesthesiology at New York University Medical Center. Bekker's work in the area of computer simulation of physiological systems was recognized nationally. He was invited to speak at the meetings organized by the American Society of Anesthesiology, Society for Technology in Anesthesia, as well as at various regional conferences. His clinical work was focused on providing perioperative care for neurosurgical patients.

In 1999, Bekker was appointed Chief of Neuroanesthesia Service. He also directed Clinical Research in the department. He led several clinical trials designed to evaluate the safety and efficacy of new pharmaceuticals. In 2001, Bekker was promoted to the academic rank of associate professor of anesthesiology with a joint appointment in the Department of Neurosurgery. In addition to his clinical research, Bekker established Basic Research Lab. His basic science research focused on neuropharmacology and understanding the effect of anesthetics on cognition.

Bekker was elected to the board of directors of the Society for Neurosurgical Anesthesiology and Critical Care in 2005. He was responsible for the educational mission of the society. From 2005 to 2010, he directed the Neuroanesthesia Update CME course offered by the NYUMC. He was invited to be a member of the editorial board of the Journal of Neurosurgical Anesthesia and Critical Care in 2006. In 2008, Bekker became Vice Chair for Research at the Department of Anesthesiology and was promoted to the rank of full professor. In the same year, Bekker founded the Foundation for Perioperative Research and Education (FPRE), which supported start-up research projects within the institution. He received several research grants, including NIH awards. Throughout his career, he has served on the ASA Academic Anesthesiology, Clinical Neurosciences, Performance and Outcomes, and Neuroanesthesia Committees.

In 2012, Bekker became professor and Chair of the Department of Anesthesiology and Perioperative Care at the Rutgers New Jersey Medical School with a joint appointment at the Department of Physiology, Pharmacology & Neurosciences. At the same time, he was asked to serve on the executive board of the New Jersey Society of Anesthesiologists.

== Research and work ==
Bekker is an author of more than 120 peer-reviewed publications in the scientific journals as well as more than 200 scientific abstracts and meeting proceedings. In addition to publications in academic journals, his early work in industry led to the award of six U.S. Patents. He has conducted more than 40 clinical and basic research investigations, the majority of which was funded by the NIH, American Heart Association (AHA), Empire Clinical Research Program as well as the Pharmaceutical Industry.

Bekker's work has been focused in the areas of clinical pharmacology of sedatives and analgesics, understanding the effects of perioperative stress and anesthetics on cognition, particularly in the elderly, and brain protection.

Bekker's work on expanding uses of dexmedetomidine, a new agent introduced in 1999 for sedation of critically ill patients, led to FDA approval of this drug for procedural sedation. Bekker demonstrated that this drug mitigates the harmful effect of perioperative stress on cognition and improves postoperative recovery.

Bekker conducted several studies addressing the issue of postoperative brain dysfunction in the elderly. In 2012, he published an article in Anesthesiology, which for the first time, demonstrated that the morphology of the brain is affected by the surgery. Although this effect may not necessarily lead to cognitive deterioration in healthy adults, it may accelerate the progression of dementia in a vulnerable population. Clinical trial supported by the grant from the National Institute of Aging confirmed these findings.

Bekker was a Principal Investigator on multiple Phase 2 and Phase 3/3b studies that evaluated the efficacy of new analgesics. He was particularly interested in expanding use on non-opioid alternatives to treat postoperative pain. Over the years, Bekker published more than 40 papers on the advantages of multimodal analgesia in neurosurgery.

== Awards and honors ==
- 1983–present - Tau Beta Pi, Engineering Honor Society
- 1986-7 - Presidential Scholarship Award New Jersey Institute of Technology
- 2005–present - Association of University Anesthesiologists (Honorific Society of Academic Anesthesiologists)
- 2015 - Fellow of American Society of Anesthesiologists
- 2016 - Distinguished New Jersey Medical School Alumni Award (The Charles L. Brown Award)

== Selected publications ==
- Bekker, A. Y., Berklayd, P., Osborn, I., Bloom, M., Yarmush, J., & Turndorf, H. (2000). The Recovery of Cognitive Function After Remifentanil- Nitrous Oxide Anesthesia Is Faster than After an Isoflurane-Nitrous Oxide-Fentanyl Combination in Elderly Patients. Anesthesia & Analgesia, 91(1), 117–122.
- Bekker, A. Y., Kaufman, B., Samir, H., & Doyle, W. (2001). The Use of Dexmedetomidine Infusion for Awake Craniotomy. Anesthesia and Analgesia, 1251–1253.
- Bekker, A., Cooper, P. R., Frempong-Boadu, A., Babu, R., Errico, T., & Lebovits, A. (2002). Evaluation of Preoperative Administration of the Cyclooxygenase-2 Inhibitor Rofecoxib for the Treatment of Postoperative Pain after Lumbar Disc Surgery. Neurosurgery, 50(5), 1053–1058.
- Bekker, A. Y., & Weeks, E. J. (2003). Cognitive function after anaesthesia in the elderly. Best Practice & Research Clinical Anaesthesiology, 17(2), 259–272.
- Bekker, A., & Sturaitis, M. K. (2005). Dexmedetomidine for Neurological Surgery. Operative Neurosurgery, 57, 1–10.
- Bekker, A., Sturaitis, M., Bloom, M., Moric, M., Golfinos, J., Parker, E., ... Pitti, A. (2008). The Effect of Dexmedetomidine on Perioperative Hemodynamics in Patients Undergoing Craniotomy. Anesthesia & Analgesia, 107(4), 1340–1347.
- Bekker, A., Haile, M., Kline, R., Didehvar, S., Babu, R., Martiniuk, F., & Urban, M. (2013). The Effect of Intraoperative Infusion of Dexmedetomidine on the Quality of Recovery After Major Spinal Surgery. Journal of Neurosurgical Anesthesiology, 25(1), 16–24.
- Le V, Ahmed K, Yarmush J, Eloy JD, Shapiro M, Haile M, Bekker A. (2016). Premedication with intravenous ibuprofen improves recovery characteristics and stress response in adults undergoing laparoscopic cholecystectomy: a randomized controlled trial. Paim Medicine, 17:1163-7
- Kline, R. P., Pirraglia, E., Cheng, H., Santi, S. D., Li, Y., Haile, M., ... Bekker, A. (2012). Surgery and Brain Atrophy in Cognitively Normal Elderly Subjects and Subjects Diagnosed with Mild Cognitive Impairment. Anesthesiology, 116(3), 603–612.
- Bekker A (2018). Cannabis use and non-cancer chronic pain. The Lancet Public Health 3:e468
- Zuo QK, Tam KL, Bekker A, Ye J-H. (2019). Cannabinoids in Opioid Addiction Treatment: Pharmacological Mechanisms. J Alcohol Drug Depend 7:325
