= Ralph Bernstein =

German-American digital imaging engineer

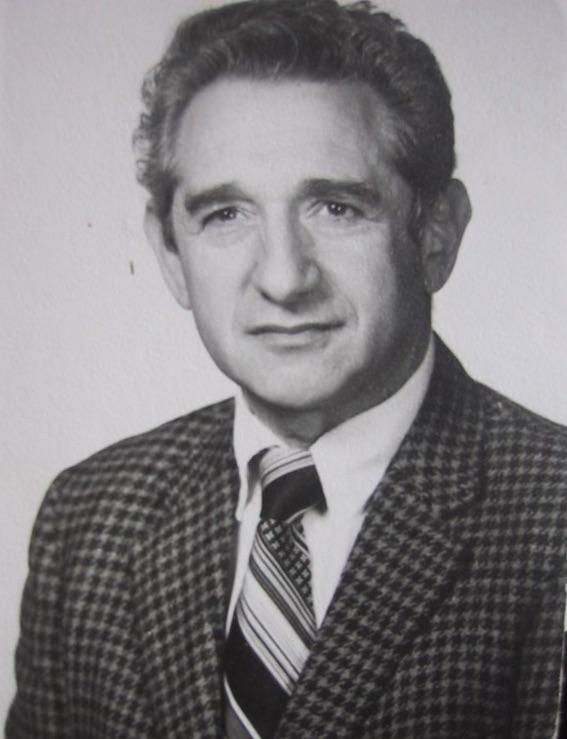
- Born: Rölf Bernstein; February 20, 1933 (age 93); Zweibrücken, Germany
- Education: University of Connecticut; Syracuse University
- Occupations: Engineer, scientist

Ralph Bernstein (born Rölf Bernstein, February 20, 1933) is a German–born American engineer known for his contributions to digital imaging, image processing, and geosciences. He is a member of the American Society for Photogrammetry and Remote Sensing (ASPRS).

== Early life and education ==
Ralph Bernstein was born in Zweibrücken, Germany, and immigrated to the United States during World War II. He received a Bachelor of Science degree in electrical engineering from the University of Connecticut (UConn) in 1956, and completed his master's degree in electrical engineering at Syracuse University in 1960.

== Career ==
Bernstein held senior positions at IBM from 1957 to 1992, including roles at the IBM Palo Alto Scientific Center and the IBM Federal Systems Division. He served as Principal Investigator for NASA's Landsat Earth observation programs, contributing to the digital processing and correction of Landsat data. He also developed an oceanographic data collection and gravity control system for Woods Hole Oceanographic Institute.

From 1992 to 2001, Bernstein worked at Electric Power Research Institute (EPRI), specializing in lightning detection and underground utility mapping. His research in digital imaging and remote sensing led to advancements in medical imaging, art restoration, and environmental monitoring.

He helped establish the Geosciences Node of the Planetary Data System (PDS), facilitating in the storage and distribution of planetary data from space missions.

Bernstein was named a Fellow of the Institute of Electrical and Electronics Engineers (IEEE) and the Tau Beta Pi National Engineering Honor Society. He also served on committees for NASA and the National Research Council (NRC).

== Personal life ==
Ralph Bernstein and his wife, Leah, live in Los Altos, California.

== Awards and recognition ==
Bernstein has received accolades such as the University of Connecticut Distinguished Engineering Alumni Award, the IBM Outstanding Contribution Award (1974), and the NASA Medal for Exceptional Scientific Achievement (1974).

== Selected publications ==
- Bernstein, Ralph (1980). "Data base requirements for remote sensing and image processing applications". In Blaser, A. (ed.). Data Base Techniques for Pictorial Applications. Lecture Notes in Computer Science. Vol. 81. Berlin, Heidelberg: Springer. pp. 319–345. doi:10.1007/3-540-09763-5_17. ISBN 978-3-540-38651-3.
- Bernstein, Ralph; Stierhoff, George C. (1976). "Precision Processing of Earth Image Data: Landsat images of the earth can be corrected by digital techniques to yield more precise information". American Scientist. 64 (5): 500–508. ISSN 0003-0996. JSTOR 27847460.
