= Omer Blodgett =

American construction expert (1917–2017)7-2017)

- Born: 1917; Duluth, Minnesota, United States
- Died: January 11, 2017 (aged 99–100)
- Education: University of Minnesota (B.Sc. in Metallurgical Engineering, M.Sc. in Mechanical Engineering)
- Occupations: Structural welder, educator, author
- Employer: Lincoln Electric (1945–2009)
- Known for: Design of Welded Structures, Design of Weldments
- Spouse: Dorothy Bernice Sjostrom (m. 1949)
- Children: 1 son
- Relatives: 3 grandchildren
- Awards: A. F. Davis Silver Medal (1962, 1973, 1980, 1983) T. R. Higgins Lectureship Award (1983); Engineering Luminary Award (1997) AISC Lifetime Achievement Award (1999)

Omer Blodgett (1917 – January 11, 2017) was a structural welder, educator, and the author of Design of Welded Structures and Design of Weldments. He was seen as an expert in his field, known for making complex issues simple and easy to understand and coining many phrases in use by structural welders. His two books are still considered foundational in structural welding.

Blodgett grew up welding. After college he worked for Globe Shipbuilding Company, learning how to troubleshoot and resolve welding issues. During World War II he supervised 400 welders who fabricated 29 all-welded oceangoing ships for the Federal Maritime Commission. He met James F. Lincoln there who invited him work for Lincoln Electric. Blodgett worked at Lincoln Electric from 1945, as a design consultant and also as a mechanical engineer, through 2009.

== Awards ==
Blodgett received the A. F. Davis Silver Medal for his work in structural design in 1962, 1973, 1980 and 1983. He was recognized as one of the top 125 engineers of the past 125 years by Engineering News-Record in 1999. He won all three AISC awards: the T.R. Higgins Lectureship Award (1983), the first Engineering Luminary Award (1997) and the Lifetime Achievement Award (1999).

== Personal life ==
Blodgett was born in Duluth, Minnesota to Myron Omer Blodgett and Minnie Long (Foster) Blodgett, a family with a fleet of lake vessels, some of which they would occasionally live aboard. He worked as a welder in the family business during high school. He attended the University of Minnesota, earning a Bachelor of Science degree in metallurgical engineering and a master's degree in mechanical engineering. He married Dorothy Bernice Sjostrom in 1949, and they had one son and three grandchildren.
