= Peter H. Soderberg =

American business executive

Peter H. Soderberg started as CEO of Hillenbrand Industries and Hillrom in February 2006. He was formerly the President and CEO of Welch Allyn from 2000 to 2006. Soderberg was the first externally recruited CEO in the history of Hillenbrand Industries.

Prior to joining Welch Allyn and Hillenbrand, Soderberg was a 23 year Johnson & Johnson(J&J) veteran. His successful career with J&J began in 1968 where he held numerous operations, marketing, and senior management positions over the years, including an international service executive role in Australia. Soderberg was the President of Johnson & Johnson Health Management from 1989 to 1993.

Soderberg serves on the Boards of: Hillenbrand Industries, Inc.; Constellation Brands, Inc.; Greatbatch, Inc.; and Advamed.
