= Frederic Holloway =

American business executive (1914–1990)

- Born: 1914; Lumberton, North Carolina, U.S.
- Died: November 30, 1990 (aged 76); Baton Rouge, Louisiana, U.S.
- Education: Georgia Tech (B.S., 1935); MIT (Ph.D., 1939)
- Organizations: Exxon; National Academy of Engineering; Gulf States Utilities; Construction Specialists

Frederic Ancrum Lord Holloway (1914–1990) was a former vice president of science and technology at Exxon.

== Early life and education ==
Holloway was born in Lumberton, North Carolina, to Elisha Andrew Holloway and Cammie Anderson. He graduated from Georgia Tech with a B.S. degree in chemical engineering in 1935 and four years later completed his doctorate in the same field at MIT.

== Career ==
=== Academic career ===
In 1965, just a year after its founding, Holloway became an elected member of the National Academy of Engineering. Between 1966 and 1972 he served on the NAE's Committee on Public Engineering Policy and, until 1975, he was part of the Committee on Environmental Engineering. Following his election into NAE Council in 1971, Holloway served two consecutive terms on its executive committee from 1971 to 1975 and from 1977 to 1986 respectively. A year prior to his election, Holloway served as vice-chairman and chairman of the Society of Chemical Industry in London. He then joined the governing board of the United States National Research Council and served for them from 1971 to 1985. During his career as chairman, Holloway was honored by Georgia Tech and Stevens Institute of Technology.

=== Exxon ===
Holloway started working for Exxon on one of their refineries at Baton Rouge, Louisiana, as a process engineer prior to outbreak of World War II in 1939. Throughout the war, he worked through the ranks, eventually becoming general superintendent in 1953 at the age of 39. In 1955, Holloway moved to Esso Standard Oil Company, and served in their headquarters until 1961. When Exxon and Esso Standard split that year, Holloway was taken by Exxon who relocated him to Houston, where he became vice president for manufacturing planning.

A year later, Exxon relocated him again, this time to New York, where he worked for their parent company as deputy refining coordinator. Until 1964, Holloway was involved with Exxon Research and Engineering Company and after his tenure with ER&E was expired in 1968, he founded Corporate Research Laboratories. For the last ten years, as Exxon employee, Holloway was the head of corporate planning department and the science and technology department. During the 1970s energy crisis when OPEC caused oil price to hike making Americans pay more, Holloway suggested Exxon to massively invest into companies that started to develop synthetic fuel technologies and other alternative energy sources.

== Retirement and death ==
Following his retirement from Exxon in 1978, Holloway continued to work for the National Academy of Engineering, as well as Gulf States Utilities and Construction Specialists, of both which he later became a director. Holloway died on November 30, 1990, at the age of 76, from intracerebral hemorrhage, which was followed by a short illness at the Baton Rouge General Medical Center, Baton Rouge, Louisiana.
