= Matthew Ohland =

American engineering education professor

Matthew Ohland is an engineering education professor at Purdue University in West Lafayette, Indiana.

== Education ==
Ohland received a BA in Religion and a BS in Engineering from Swarthmore College in 1989, master's degrees in mechanical and civil engineering from Rensselaer Polytechnic Institute in 1991 and 1992, and a PhD in civil engineering from the University of Florida in 1996.

== Career ==
Ohland was a National Science Foundation Postdoctoral Fellow for Science, Mathematics, Engineering, and Technology Education from 1998 to 2000. He was President of Tau Beta Pi from 2002-2006. He has been a professor at Clemson University and Purdue University.

In 2004, Ohland started MIDFIELD (Multiple-Institution Database for Investigating Engineering Longitudinal Development), a widely cited database containing student records and demographics for over one million undergraduate engineering students.

In 2018, Ohland was inducted into Purdue University's Center for Instructional Excellence Book of Great Teachers.

== Awards and honors ==
- Fellow, American Society for Engineering Education
- Fellow, Institute of Electrical and Electronics Engineers for "contributions to and leadership in engineering education"
- Fellow, American Association for the Advancement of Science
