= Roger S. Pressman =

American software engineer

Roger S. Pressman is an American software engineer, author and consultant, and President of R.S. Pressman & Associates. He is also Founder and Director of Engineering for EVANNEX, a company that sells parts and accessories for electric vehicles.

He received a BSE from the University of Connecticut, an MS from the University of Bridgeport and a PhD from the University of Connecticut. He has over 40 years of experience working as a software engineer, a manager, a professor, an author, and a consultant, focusing on software engineering issues. He has been on the Editorial Boards of IEEE Software and The Cutter IT Journal. He is a member of the IEEE and Tau Beta Pi. Pressman has designed and developed products that are used worldwide for software engineering training and process improvement.

As an entrepreneur, Pressman founded EVANNEX, a company specializing in aftermarket accessories for electric vehicles with a strong emphasis of Tesla Model S, Model X, Model 3, Model Y and CyberTruck. Since the founding of EVANNEX in 2013, Pressman has designed and developed a variety of custom aftermarket products for Tesla vehicles that are manufactured at EVANNEX's Florida location.

== Publications ==
Roger Pressman has authored papers, articles and books on technical and management subjects. His books include:

- 1977. Numerical control and computer-aided manufacturing
- 1982. Software engineering : a practitioner's approach (first edition)
- 1988. Making software engineering happen : a guide for instituting the technology.
- 1988. Software engineering : a beginner's guide.
- 1989. Software engineering : a practitioner's approach (second edition)
- 1991. Software shock : the danger & the opportunity
- 1993. A Manager's Guide to Software Engineering
- 2009. Web engineering : a practitioner's approach
- 2010. The Aymara Bridge (a novel)
- 2011. The Puppeteer (a novel)
- 2017. Getting Ready for Model 3
- 2020. Software engineering : a practitioner's approach (ninth edition)
