= Allen F. Jacobson =

American corporate executive (1926–2012)

- Born: Allen Frank Jacobson; October 7, 1926; Omaha, Nebraska, US
- Died: November 1, 2012 (aged 86); Naples, Florida, US
- Other name: Jake Jacobson
- Education: University of Iowa
- Occupations: CEO and Chairman
- Employer: 3M

Allen Frank Jacobson (October 7, 1926 – November 1, 2012) was an American chemical engineer and corporate executive. He was the chief executive officer of 3M and a member of the National Academy of Engineering.

== Early life ==
"Jake" Jacobson was born in Omaha, Nebraska on October 7, 1926. His parents were Ruth and Alma F. Jacobson, who worked for various telephone companies before becoming president of Northwestern Bell Telephone Company in 1955. His paternal grandfather was a saddle maker for Buffalo Bill's Wild West Show. As a child, Jacobson lived in Omaha, Nebraska; Minneapolis, Minnesota; Duluth, Minnesota; and Sioux Falls, South Dakota.

Jacobson attended Creighton University and the University of Omaha. He graduated with a BS in chemical engineering from Iowa State College of Agriculture and Mechanic Arts (now Iowa State University) in 1947. While at Iowa State, he was a member of Kappa Sigma fraternity and Tau Beta Pi engineering honor society.

== Career ==
In 1947, Jacobson joined 3M as a chemical engineer, working in the Minnesota Mining and Manufacturing (3M) tape product control laboratory in Saint Paul, Minnesota. In 1950, he became a technical assistant to the Hutchinson, Minnesota plant manager. He had the same position in Bristol, Pennsylvania starting in 1953. He became the production superintendent of tape production at the Bristol plant from 1953 to October 1959.

Jacobson became the manager of the 3M tape plant in Saint Paul in 1959 and the manager of the Bristol plant in February 1961. He became the general manager of the company's industrial tape division in February 1963.

Jacobson was promoted to vice president and general manager of 3M Canada Ltd. and vice president of 3M Europe. He became the vice president in 1975 and executive vice president in the industrial and consumer sector at 3M in 1981. On March 1, 1984, Jacobson became the president of 3M's United States operations. In March 1986, he became the chairman and chief executive officer of 3M. In this capacity, he focused on research and increased the company income by growing in new fields such as magnetic media. He retired as chairman of the board and CEO of in October 1991, after a career of 44 years at 3M.

Jacobson was elected to the board of directors of Sara Lee Corporation in May 1990. In 1991, he became one of sixteen members of President George H. W. Bush's U.S. Advisory Commission on Work-Based Learning. In April 1992, he became a member of the board of directors of Prudential Insurance. He was also a board member of Northern States Power Company, Pillsbury, and US West. He also served on the board of directors of Valmont Industries for 23 years.

== Honors ==
Jacobson received the Marston Medal from the University of Iowa for outstanding contributions in engineering. In April 1988, Jacobson was on the cover of Fortune. In 1991, Jacobson was elected as a member of the National Academy of Engineering. Allen Jacobson chemical engineering lab at the Iowa State University is named after him. The College of Engineering at the University of Texas at Austin has the Allen F. Jacobson Endowed Scholarship for graduate students.

== Personal life ==
Jacobson was married Barbara Jean Benidt on April 18, 1964, in Ramsey, Minnesota. They had three children: Allen Jacobson Jr., Holly Jacobson, and Paul Jacobson. His wife died in May 1993.

Jacobson was the chair of the United Way of Saint Paul, was a board member of the Ordway Center for the Performing Arts, and a supporter of the Boy Scouts and Habitat for Humanity. In the 1960s, he was a director of the Bucks County Development Corporation and the Lower Bucks County Hospital. In November 1989, he became the national chairman of the U.S. Savings Bonds Volunteer Committee. He was a Presbyterian.

In his retirement, Jacobson lived in Naples, Florida. Jacobson died on November 1, 2012, in Naples at the age of 86.
