= Arthur Baggeroer =

American electrical engineer

- Born: Arthur Bernard Baggeroer; June 9, 1942 (age 84); Weymouth, Massachusetts, U.S.
- Education: Purdue University (BSEE); Massachusetts Institute of Technology (SM, ScD)
- Awards: IEEE Award for Underwater Signal Processing; IEEE Fellow; IEEE Oceanic Engineering Society Distinguished Technical Achievement Award; Acoustical Society of America Fellow; ASA Silver Medal; NDIA VADM Charles Martel - David Bushnell Award; Member of the National Academy of Engineering; American Association for the Advancement of Science Fellow
- Scientific career
- Fields: Sonar; Underwater Acoustics
- Workplaces: Massachusetts Institute of Technology; MIT Lincoln Laboratory; Woods Hole Oceanographic Institution
- Thesis: State variables, the Fredholm theory and optimal communications. (1968)
- Doctoral advisor: Harry L. Van Trees

Arthur Bernard Baggeroer (born June 9, 1942) is an American electrical engineer and emeritus ford professor of engineering in the Departments of Mechanical Engineering and Electrical Engineering & Computer Science at the Massachusetts Institute of Technology.

Baggeroer is known for his research advancements in signal processing and sonar, and is recognized as an international authority on underwater acoustics.

== Education and employment ==
Baggeroer received his B.S.E.E from Purdue University (1963) and both his S.M. (1965) and Sc.D. (1968) in electrical engineering from the Massachusetts Institute of Technology. His doctoral thesis State variables, the Fredholm theory and optimal communications was advised by Harry L. Van Trees. He joined the faculty at MIT in 1968, where he taught Signal Processing: Continuous and Discrete; Sonar, Radar, & Seismic Signal Processing; Array Processing; and Stochastic Processes, Detection, and Estimation.

While on sabbatical from MIT, Baggeroer served as a consultant to the Chief of Naval Research at the NATO SACLANT Center (1977) and as a Cecil and Ida Green Scholar at the Scripps Institution of Oceanography (1990). He was an advisor to the U.S. Navy on the Ocean Studies Board and Naval Studies Board, as well as the chief scientist on 15 oceanography cruises. He has been affiliated with MIT Lincoln Laboratory and the Woods Hole Oceanographic Institution for many years, including as the director of the MIT-Woods Hole Joint Program in Oceanography and Oceanographic Engineering from 1983-1988.

== Awards and affiliations ==
Baggeroer is a member of the National Academy of Engineering (1995). He is an IEEE fellow and AAAS fellow, as well as a fellow of the Acoustical Society of America, to which he was elected as a member of the Executive Council from 1994 to 1997. In 1998, he was awarded a Secretary of the Navy/Chief of Naval Operations Chair in Oceanographic Science. He is also a member of the engineering honor societies Tau Beta Pi, Eta Kappa Nu, and Sigma Xi.

Baggeroer has received numerous accolades for his research work and involvement with the oceanographic community including the IEEE Oceanic Engineering Society Distinguished Technical Achievement Award (1992), Rayleigh-Helmholtz Medal (2003), IEEE Underwater Acoustic Signal Processing Award (2009), Purdue Outstanding Electrical and Computer Engineering award (2006), and the NDIA VADM Charles B. Martell - David Bushnell Award (2008).
