= Kenneth L. Schroeder =

American businessman

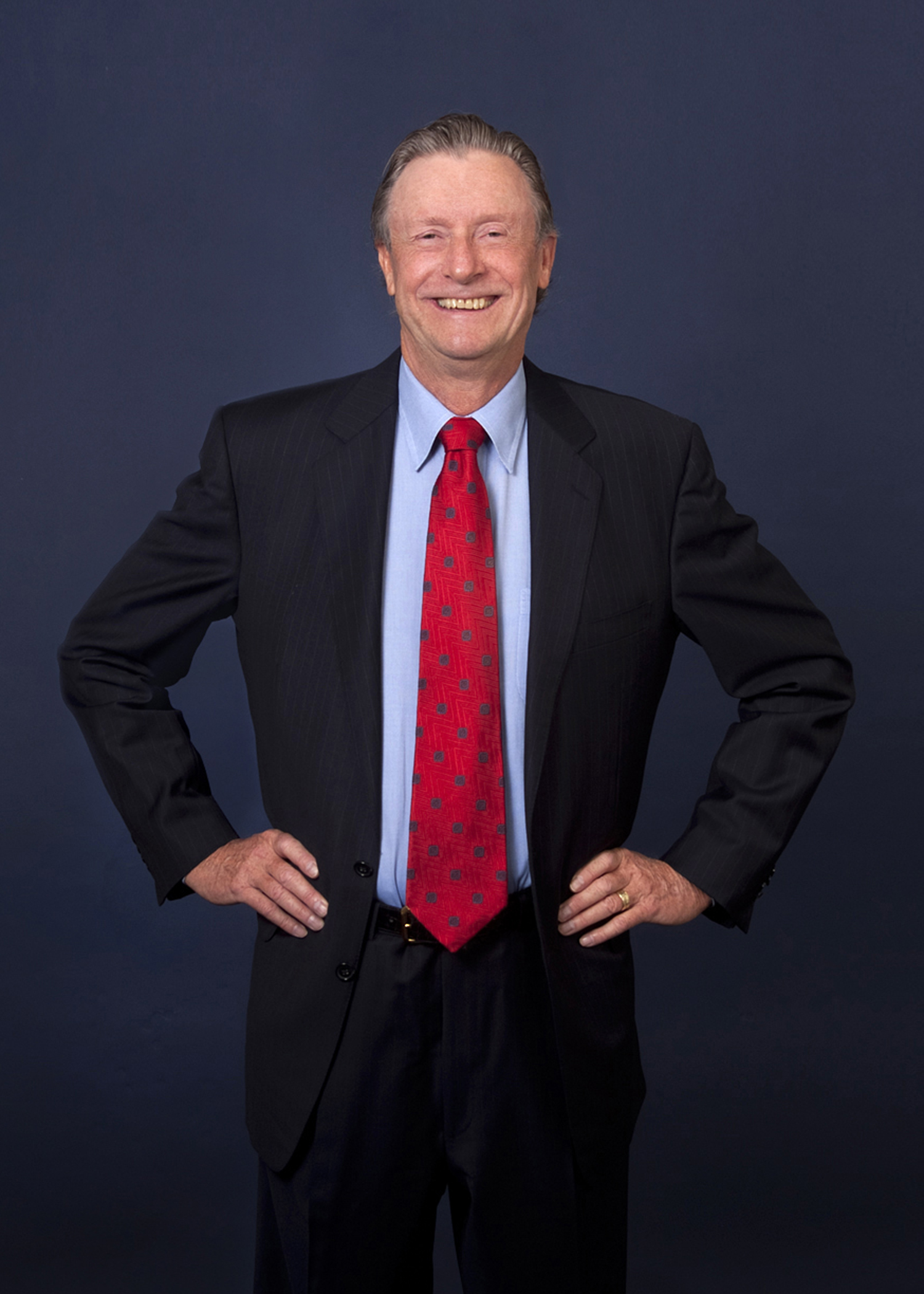
- Born: 1945
- Died: October 26, 2016 (aged 70–71); Los Altos Hills, CA, US
- Education: University of Wisconsin University of Pennsylvania
- Occupations: Engineer, Corporate Executive
- Spouse: Fran Codispoti
- Children: 2

Kenneth L. Schroeder (also Kenneth Schroeder and Ken Schroeder; 1945 – October 26, 2016) was an American technology-focused corporate executive. Schroeder served as CEO of KLA-Tencor, a supplier of process control and yield management products for the semiconductor and related microelectronics industries.

During the period from 1991–2005, when Schroeder was first president and COO and then CEO, the company's market capitalization increased fifty times from $180 million to $10 billion. During his tenure as CEO (1999–2005), the company's revenue doubled from $1 billion to $2.1 billion and retained earnings tripled from $700 million to $2.1 billion. In 2002, Chief Executive Magazine ranked Schroeder one of its top 100 CEOs. In 2003, Schroeder was included in the CEO 100 list in Who's Who in Semiconductors. And in 2006, Institutional Investor named Schroeder the number one CEO in the semiconductor equipment industry.

In 2007, the United States Securities and Exchange Commission (SEC) alleged that Schroeder engaged in a scheme to illegally backdate options. In 2010, Schroeder settled part of the SEC's action against him by agreeing to a $275,000 civil penalty, as well as a permanent injunction on future violations of the federal securities laws. However, the Federal Court of the United States in San Jose later declined to enter a director and officer bar sought by the SEC, finding that the SEC had failed to demonstrate that Schroeder "possessed the degree of scienter sufficient to impose a five year director bar."

== Early life and career ==
Schroeder graduated from the University of Wisconsin, Madison with a Bachelor of Science degree in electrical engineering in 1967. He received a master's degree in business from the Wharton School of the University of Pennsylvania in 1969.

Following Wharton, Schroeder worked at Hewlett-Packard as a manufacturing engineer, manufacturing engineering manager and operations manager of the computer division. In 1973, Schroeder moved to Spectra Physics, a laser supplier, to serve as manufacturing manager and then general manager of the Construction Laser Division.

== KLA-Tencor ==
In 1979, Schroeder joined KLA Instruments (later known as KLA-Tencor) as employee 95. Schroeder started as the vice president of manufacturing and became senior vice-president in charge of two divisions (Wafer Inspection Systems and Reticle & Photomask Inspection). He worked at KLA until he left in 1987 to serve as CEO of Photon Dynamics.

In 1991, he rejoined KLA as president and COO and served on the Board of Directors. In these roles, all divisions of the company reported to Schroeder.

In 1999, Schroeder became CEO on July 1. Under Schroeder's leadership, KLA-Tencor became nationally recognized. In 2002, Business Week ranked KLA-Tencor the sixth best performer in the S&P 500. In 2005, Forbes rated KLA-Tencor as one of the 25 best-managed companies in the United States. Acknowledging Schroeder's management skill, KLA-Tencor was deemed "one of the best run semiconductor equipment companies in the world" in January 2005 by Electronic Business Magazine, which featured Mr. Schroeder on its cover.

Under Schroeder's leadership, KLA-Tencor also invested in training and mentoring its employees and was ranked as having the fifth best training program in the United States. Despite a severe, cyclical downturn that began in 2001, Schroeder maintained the profitability of KLA-Tencor during this difficult period. Schroeder grew KLA-Tencor's work force over 30% while he was CEO. When Schroeder retired from the CEO position the company had grown to over 5570 employees. KLA-Tencor was ranked by San Jose Magazine as “one of the best places to work” in Silicon Valley.

Schroeder retired as CEO of KLA-Tencor and resigned from the Board of Directors at the end of 2005. In a press release upon his retirement, Chairman Kenneth Levy said, “During Ken’s tenure as CEO, KLA-Tencor’s sales doubled from $1 billion to $2.1 billion and retained earnings tripled from $700 million to $2.1 billion.”

In connection with his retirement, Schroeder entered into an agreement with KLA-Tencor that he would be employed as a “part-time advisor” to insure a smooth transition of power and prevent him from working for a competing company.

In the wake of a stock option backdating probe by the SEC of KLA-Tencor, the company terminated its contract with Schroeder in 2006. In total, Schroeder worked for KLA-Tencor for 22 years.

== Legal ==
In 2008 the Northern District of California U.S. Attorney's Office concluded their two-year stock options backdating probe of Schroeder. No indictment was filed due to a lack of evidence, and due to the fact that Schroeder did not exercise or profit from the allegedly backdated option grants. Following the Wall Street Journal's 2006 expose of stock option backdating, the SEC alleged that Schroeder had engaged in this practice.

In 2009, Schroeder filed a lawsuit against KLA-Tencor in the California Superior Court asserting contract and tort claims in connection with the termination of his employment and cancellation of certain equity awards in October 2006. KLA settled the suit by paying Schroeder $16.5 million.

In June 2010, Schroeder settled part of the SEC's action against him by agreeing to a $275,000 civil penalty, as well as a permanent injunction on future violations of the federal securities laws. As part of the settlement agreement, Schroeder and the SEC agreed to have the Court to determine whether to impose a five-year officer and director bar sought by the SEC. In November 2010, the Federal District Court in San Jose ruled against the SEC on its request for an officer and director bar against Schroeder. In his decision Judge James Ware stated that “although the Court finds examples of the recurrent nature of Defendant’s alleged violative conduct, there is also uncontroverted evidence showing that someone had altered Defendant’s signature and the date on backdated documents. Thus, it cannot be said that the SEC has demonstrated that Defendant possessed the degree of scienter sufficient to impose a five year director bar. Further, because it appears that Defendant has had difficulty obtaining regular employment since October 2006 when KLA made public the allegations against Defendant, the Court finds that he has already been effectively barred from his profession for four years." The SEC had unsuccessfully sought to bar Schroeder from serving as a director or officer of a publicly traded company.

== Awards ==
- In 1994 and 1995, market analysis group VLSI Research named Schroeder “Most Valuable Executive.” Later, in 2004, he was elected to VLSI Research's Hall of Fame.
- The University of Wisconsin–Madison awarded Schroeder a distinguished service citation.

-Schroeder is a member of Tau Beta Pi, a national engineering honorary society.

== Board positions ==
Schroeder has been a member of the Board of Directors of KLA-Tencor, Adept Technology, Photon Dynamics, Gasonics (now a division of (Novellus), Genus, Semiconductor Equipment and Materials Institute (SEMI) and Semi-Sematech.

== Philanthropy ==
Along with his wife, Fran Codispoti, Schroeder contributes financially to Avenidas, a community that celebrates and supports older adults, among other local charities.

In 2003, Schroeder established an annual charitable giving program at KLA-Tencor whereby over seventy employees are recognized and awarded $1,000 to grant to their favorite charity.

== Personal ==
Schroeder was married to Fran Codispoti. They had two grown children and lived in Los Altos Hills, California.

== Death ==
Schroeder died on October 26, 2016.
