= Shirley Jane Vernon =

American architect

- Born: December 9, 1930; Mt. Kisco, NY
- Died: February 27, 2011 (aged 80)
- Education: Pennsylvania State University
- Occupation: Architect
- Awards: Fellow of the American Institute of Architects
- Practice: Private practice; also Ballinger Co.
- Buildings: U.S. Embassy Office in Quito, Ecuador; Union Carbide Technical Center in Tarrytown, New York; Franklin Institute Research Laboratories in Philadelphia, Pennsylvania

Shirley Jane Vernon (December 9, 1930 - February 27, 2011) was an American architect and architectural educator in Pennsylvania. She was named a Fellow of the American Institute of Architects in 1976.

== Early life and education ==
Born in 1930 in Mt. Kisco, NY, Vernon was the daughter of Joseph Harry Vernon and Marion (Maher) Vernon.

She graduated from Lower Merion High School in Ardmore, Pennsylvania and received her Bachelor of Architecture degree from Pennsylvania State University in 1953.

== Career in architecture ==
After graduation in 1953, Vernon began employment in the architectural firm of Vincent G. Kling, who specialized in commercial designs. She started a private practice in 1968 and from 1974 to 1976 she also served as a project manager at The Ballinger Company in Philadelphia. Her clients included the Philadelphia Department of Recreation, the University of Pennsylvania, Rosemont College, and Philadelphia Health Services, Inc.

Vernon was registered to practice in Pennsylvania and held a National Council of Architectural Registration Boards certification. Her major buildings and projects included: the U.S. Embassy Office in Quito, Ecuador (for which her firm received a gold medal from the city of Quito), the Union Carbide Technical Center in Tarrytown, New York, the Franklin Institute Research Laboratories in Philadelphia and the Peasant Garb Shop in Philadelphia (1969).

Verson joined the American Institute of Architects in 1965, chaired of the Philadelphia Chapter's Centennial Year Book Committee in 1969 and served as vice president of the Philadelphia Chapter.

== Career in architectural education ==
Vernon taught at Drexel University (formerly Drexel Institute of Technology) from 1957 to 1987, first as adjunct professor in the Department of Architecture, then as professor of Design Fundamentals and Urban Planning in the Department of Civil Engineering. From 1986 to 1996 she was on the faculty of Moore College of Art & Design as a professor in their Department of Interior Design.

After her retirement, Vernon served as a consultant to the Department of Interior Design at Moore College until her death in Philadelphia in 2011.

== Honors and awards ==
Vernon was awarded an American Institute of Architects Student Medal and was the second woman from Penn State elected to Tau Beta Pi, the national engineering honor society. She was made a Fellow of the American Institute of Architects in 1976.

In 2012 Moore College of Art and Design announced the establishment of the Shirley Vernon Endowed Scholarship for Excellence in Design.
