= List of Kyoto Prize winners =

This is a list of Kyoto Prize winners, awarded annually by the Inamori Foundation.

== Basic sciences ==
Source: Kyoto Prize

Year	Laureate	Country		
1985	Claude Elwood Shannon	United States	1916–2001	Mathematical sciences
1986	George Evelyn Hutchinson	United States	1903–1991	Biological sciences
1987	Jan Hendrik Oort	Netherlands	1900–1992	Earth and planetary sciences, astronomy and astrophysics
1988	Avram Noam Chomsky	United States	born 1928	Cognitive science
1989	Izrail Moiseevich Gelfand	Soviet Union	1913–2009	Mathematical sciences
1990	Jane Goodall	United Kingdom	1934–2025	Biological sciences
1991	Edward Norton Lorenz	United States	1917–2008	Earth and planetary sciences, astronomy and astrophysics
1992	Yasutomi Nishizuka	Japan	1932–2004	Life sciences
1993	William Donald Hamilton	United Kingdom	1936–2000	Biological sciences
1994	André Weil	France	1906–1998	Mathematical sciences
1995	Chūshirō Hayashi	Japan	1920–2010	Earth and planetary sciences, astronomy and astrophysics
1996	Mario Renato Capecchi	United States	born 1937	Life sciences
1997	Daniel Hunt Janzen	United States	born 1939	Biological sciences
1998	Kiyoshi Itô	Japan	1915–2008	Mathematical sciences
1999	Walter Heinrich Munk	United States	1917–2019	Earth and planetary sciences, astronomy and astrophysics
2000	Walter Jakob Gehring	Switzerland	1939–2014	Life sciences
2001	John Maynard Smith	United Kingdom	1920–2004	Biological sciences
2002	Mikhail Gromov	France	born 1943	Mathematical sciences
2003	Eugene Newman Parker	United States	1927–2022	Earth and planetary sciences, astronomy and astrophysics
2004	Alfred G. Knudson	United States	1922–2016	Life sciences
2005	Simon Asher Levin	United States	born 1941	Biological sciences
2006	Hirotsugu Akaike	Japan	1927–2009	Mathematical sciences
2007	Hiroo Kanamori	Japan	born 1936	Earth and planetary sciences, astronomy and astrophysics
2008	Anthony James Pawson	Canada / United Kingdom	1952–2013	Life sciences
2009	Barbara Rosemary Grant	United Kingdom	born 1936	Biological sciences
2009	Peter Raymond Grant	United Kingdom	born 1936	Biological sciences
2010	László Lovász	Hungary	born 1948	Mathematical sciences
2011	Rashid Alievich Sunyaev	Russia / Germany	born 1943	Earth and planetary sciences, astronomy and astrophysics
2012	Yoshinori Ohsumi	Japan	born 1945	Life sciences
2013	Masatoshi Nei	United States	1931–2023	Biological sciences
2014	Edward Witten	United States	born 1951	Mathematical sciences
2015	Michel Mayor	Switzerland	born 1942	Earth and planetary sciences, astronomy and astrophysics
2016	Tasuku Honjo	Japan	born 1942	Life sciences
2017	Graham Farquhar	Australia	born 1947	Biological sciences
2018	Masaki Kashiwara	Japan	born 1947	Mathematical sciences
2019	James Gunn	United States	born 1938	Earth and Planetary Sciences, Astronomy and Astrophysics
2020	No award because of COVID-19 pandemic			
2021	Robert G. Roeder	United States	born 1942	Life sciences
2022	Bryan Grenfell	United Kingdom	born 1954	Biological sciences
2023	Elliott H. Lieb	United States	born 1932	Mathematical sciences
2024	Paul F. Hoffman	Canada	born 1941	Earth and Planetary Sciences, Astronomy and Astrophysics
2025	Azim Surani	United Kingdom	born 1945	Life Sciences and Medicine

== Advanced technology ==
Source: Kyoto Prize

Year	Laureate	Country		
1985	Rudolf Emil Kálmán	Hungary / United States	1930–2016	Electronics
1986	Nicole Marthe Le Douarin	France	born 1930	Biotechnology and medical technology
1987	Morris Cohen	United States	1911–2005	Materials science and engineering
1988	John McCarthy	United States	1927–2011	Information science
1989	Amos E. Joel, Jr.	United States	1918–2008	Electronics
1990	Sydney Brenner	United Kingdom	1927–2019	Biotechnology and medical technology
1991	Michael Szwarc	United States	1909–2000	Materials science and engineering
1992	Maurice Vincent Wilkes	United Kingdom	1913–2010	Information science
1993	Jack St. Clair Kilby	United States	1923–2005	Electronics
1994	Paul Christian Lauterbur	United States	1929–2007	Biotechnology and medical technology
1995	George William Gray	United Kingdom	1926–2013	Materials science and engineering
1996	Donald Ervin Knuth	United States	born 1938	Information science
1997	Stanley Mazor	United States	born 1941	Electronics
1997	Marcian Edward Hoff Jr.	United States	born 1937	Electronics
1997	Federico Faggin	Italy	born 1941	Electronics
1997	Masatoshi Shima	Japan	born 1943	Electronics
1998	Kurt Wüthrich	Switzerland	born 1938	Biotechnology and medical technology
1999	W. David Kingery	United States	1926–2000	Materials science and engineering
2000	Sir Antony Hoare	United Kingdom	1934-2026	Information science
2001	Morton B. Panish	United States	born 1929	Electronics
2001	Izuo Hayashi	Japan	1922–2005	Electronics
2001	Zhores Ivanovich Alferov	Russia	1930–2019	Electronics
2002	Leroy Edward Hood	United States	born 1938	Biotechnology and medical technology
2003	George McClelland Whitesides	United States	born 1939	Materials science and engineering
2004	Alan Curtis Kay	United States	born 1940	Information science
2005	George H. Heilmeier	United States	1936–2014	Electronics
2006	Leonard Herzenberg	United States	1931–2013	Biotechnology and medical technology
2007	Hiroo Inokuchi	Japan	1927–2014	Materials science and engineering
2008	Richard M. Karp	United States	born 1935	Information science
2009	Isamu Akasaki	Japan	1929–2021	Electronics
2010	Shinya Yamanaka	Japan	born 1962	Biotechnology and medical technology
2011	John Werner Cahn	United States	1928–2016	Materials science and engineering
2012	Ivan Edward Sutherland	United States	born 1938	Information science
2013	Robert H. Dennard	United States	1932-2024	Electronics
2014	Robert S. Langer	United States	born 1948	Biotechnology and medical technology
2015	Toyoki Kunitake	Japan	born 1936	Materials science and engineering
2016	Takeo Kanade	Japan	born 1945	Information science
2017	Takashi Mimura	Japan	born 1944	Electronics
2018	Karl Deisseroth	United States	born 1971	Biotechnology and medical technology
2019	Ching Wan Tang	Hong Kong	born 1947	Materials Science and Engineering
2020	No award because of COVID-19 pandemic			
2021	Andrew Chi-Chih Yao	China / United States	born 1946	Information science
2022	Carver Mead	United States	born 1934	Electronics
2023	Ryuzo Yanagimachi	United States	1928-2023	Biotechnology and medical technology
2024	John Pendry	United Kingdom	born 1943	Materials science and engineering
2025	Shun-ichi Amari	Japan	born 1936	Information Science

== Arts and philosophy ==
Source: Kyoto Prize

Year	Laureate	Country		
1985	Olivier Messiaen	France	1908–1992	Music
1986	Isamu Noguchi	United States	1904–1988	Arts
1987	Andrzej Wajda	Poland	1926–2016	Theater, cinema
1988	Paul Thieme	West Germany	1905–2001	Thought and Ethics
1989	John Cage	United States	1912–1992	Music
1990	Renzo Piano	Italy	born 1937	Arts
1991	Peter Stephen Paul Brook	United Kingdom	1925–2022	Theater, cinema
1992	Karl Raimund Popper	United Kingdom	1902–1994	Thought and Ethics
1993	Witold Lutosławski	Poland	1913–1994	Music
1994	Akira Kurosawa	Japan	1910–1998	Theater, cinema
1995	Roy Lichtenstein	United States	1923–1997	Arts
1996	Willard Van Orman Quine	United States	1908–2000	Thought and ethics
1997	Iannis Xenakis	France	1922–2001	Music
1998	Nam June Paik	United States	1932–2006	Arts
1999	Maurice Béjart	France	1927–2007	Theater, cinema
2000	Paul Ricœur	France	1913–2005	Thought and Ethics
2001	György Ligeti	Austria / Hungary	1923–2006	Music
2002	Tadao Ando	Japan	born 1941	Arts
2003	Tamao Yoshida	Japan	1919–2006	Theater, cinema
2004	Jürgen Habermas	Germany	1929-2026	Thought and Ethics
2005	Nikolaus Harnoncourt	Austria	1929–2016	Music
2006	Issey Miyake	Japan	1938-2022	Arts
2007	Pina Bausch	Germany	1940–2009	Theater, cinema
2008	Charles Margrave Taylor	Canada	born 1931	Thought and Ethics
2009	Pierre Boulez	France	1925–2016	Music
2010	William Kentridge	South Africa	born 1955	Arts
2011	Tamasaburo Bando V	Japan	born 1950	Theater, cinema
2012	Gayatri Chakravorty Spivak	India	born 1942	Thought and Ethics
2013	Cecil Taylor	United States	1929–2018	Music
2014	Fukumi Shimura	Japan	born 1924	Arts
2015	John Neumeier	United States	born 1942	Theater, Cinema
2016	Martha Craven Nussbaum	United States	born 1947	Thought and Ethics
2017	Richard Taruskin	United States	1945–2022	Music history
2018	Joan Jonas	United States	born 1936	Arts
2019	Ariane Mnouchkine	France	born 1939	Arts and Philosophy
2020	No award because of COVID-19 pandemic			
2021	Bruno Latour	France	1947–2022	Thought and Ethics
2022	Zakir Hussain	India	1951–2024	Music
2023	Nalini Malani	India	born 1946	Arts
2024	William Forsythe	United States	born 1949	Theater, Cinema
2025	Carol Gilligan	United States	born 1936	Thought and Ethics

== See also ==
- The Kyoto Prize in Advanced Technology
- The Kyoto Prize in Basic Sciences
- The Kyoto Prize in Arts and Philosophy
- The Kyoto Prize
