= Kyoto Prize in Advanced Technology =

Technology award presented by the Inamori Foundation since 1985

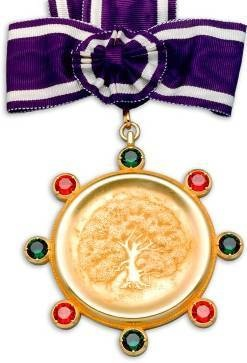
- Venue: Kyoto International Conference Center, Kyoto, Japan
- Presented by: Inamori Foundation
- Reward: ¥100,000,000
- First award: 1985
- Website: www.kyotoprize.org

The Kyoto Prize in Advanced Technology is awarded annually by the Inamori Foundation. The Prize is one of three Kyoto Prize categories; the others are the Kyoto Prize in Basic Sciences and the Kyoto Prize in Arts and Philosophy. The first Kyoto Prize in Advanced Technology was awarded to Rudolf E. Kálmán, the "creator of modern control and system theory". The Prize is widely regarded as the most prestigious award available in fields which are traditionally not honored with a Nobel Prize.

== Fields ==
The Kyoto Prize in Advanced Technology is awarded on a rotating basis to researchers in the following four fields:

- Electronics
- Biotechnology and Medical Technology
- Materials Science and Engineering
- Information Science

== Laureates ==
=== Electronics ===
Year	Laureate		Country (Note: The country in which the laureate's academic affiliation is based, according to the Kyoto Prize website.)	Citation	Ref.
Year	Image	Name	Country	Citation	Ref.
1985		Rudolf Emil Kalman	Switzerland	"Establishment of the Modern Control Theory Based on the State Space Approach."	
1989	Amos E. Joel, Jr.		United States	"Pioneering Contribution to the Electronic Switching Technology for Telecommunications, Especially that Based on the Concept of 'Stored Program Control'."	
1993		Jack St. Clair Kilby	United States	"Creation of the Concept of the Monolithic Semiconductor Integrated Circuit and Its Demonstration."	
1997		Federico Faggin	United States	"Development of the World’s First Microprocessor."	
1997		Marcian Edward Hoff, Jr.	United States	"Development of the World’s First Microprocessor."	
1997		Stanley Mazor	United States	"Development of the World’s First Microprocessor."	
1997		Masatoshi Shima	Japan	"Development of the World’s First Microprocessor."	
2001		Zhores Ivanovich Alferov	Russia	"A Pioneering Step in the Development of Optoelectronics through Success in Continuous Operation of Semiconductor Lasers at Room Temperature."	
2001	Izuo Hayashi		Japan	"A Pioneering Step in the Development of Optoelectronics through Success in Continuous Operation of Semiconductor Lasers at Room Temperature."	
2001	Morton B. Panish		United States	"A Pioneering Step in the Development of Optoelectronics through Success in Continuous Operation of Semiconductor Lasers at Room Temperature."	
2005		George H. Heilmeier	United States	"Pioneering contributions to the realization of flat-panel displays using liquid crystals."	
2009		Isamu Akasaki	Japan	"Pioneering Work on Gallium Nitride p-n Junctions and Related Contributions to the Development of Blue Light Emitting Devices."	
2013		Robert Heath Dennard	United States	"Invention of Dynamic Random Access Memory and Proposal of Guidelines for FET Miniaturization."	
2017	Takashi Mimura		Japan	Invention of the High Electron Mobility Transistor (HEMT) and Its Development for the Progress of Information and Communications Technology."	
2022		Carver Mead	United States	"Leading Contributions to the Establishment of the Guiding Principles for VLSI Systems Design."	
2026	Tsutomu Miyasaka		Japan	"Creation of Next-Generation Photovoltaic Technologies, Perovskite Solar Cells."	

=== Biotechnology and Medical Technology ===
Year	Laureate		Country	Citation	Ref.
Year	Image	Name	Country	Citation	Ref.
1986		Nicole Marthe Le Douarin	France	"Outstanding Contribution to Embryology through the Development of the Technology for Making Chicken/Quail Chimeras."	
1990		Sydney Brenner	United Kingdom	"Pioneering Contribution to Molecular Biology through Demonstration of Messenger RNA and Establishment of C. Elegans as an Experimental System for Developmental Biology."	
1994		Paul Christian Lauterbur	United States	"Proposal of the Basic Principles and Outstanding Contribution to the Development of MRI that Confers a Great Benefit on Clinical Medicine."	
1998		Kurt Wüthrich	Switzerland	"Outstanding Contribution to Biology through the Expansion of the Nuclear Magnetic Resonance (NMR) Spectroscopy to the Structure Analyses of Biological Macromolecules in Water Solution, an Environment Similar to That in the Living Cell."	
2002		Leroy Edward Hood	United States	"Contributions to life sciences through the automation of protein and DNA sequencing and synthesis."	
2006		Leonard Arthur Herzenberg	United States	"Outstanding contribution to life sciences with the development of a flow cytometer that uses fluorescent-labeled monoclonal antibodies."	
2010		Shinya Yamanaka	Japan	"Development of Technology for Generating Induced Pluripotent Stem (iPS) Cells."	
2014		Robert Samuel Langer	United States	"Creation of Tissue Engineering and Drug Delivery System Technologies."	
2018		Karl Deisseroth	United States	"Discovery of Optogenetics and Development of Causal Systems Neuroscience."	
2023		Ryuzo Yanagimachi	United States	"Contributions to the Elucidation of Fertilization Mechanisms and the Establishment of Microinsemination Technology."	

=== Materials Science and Engineering ===
Year	Laureate		Country	Citation	Ref.
Year	Image	Name	Country	Citation	Ref.
1987	Morris Cohen		United States	"Fundamental Contribution to Development of New Materials Based on Creation of Broad and Basic Insights into the Metal Phase Transformation and Structure-Property Relationship."	
1991	Michael Szwarc		United States	"Pioneering Contribution to Research and Development of Polymeric Materials by Discovering 'Living Polymerization'."	
1995	George William Gray		United Kingdom	"Fundamental Contribution to Research and Development of Liquid Crystal Materials by Establishing the Practical Molecular Design Methods."	
1999	W. David Kingery		United States	"Fundamental Contribution to Development of the Ceramics Science and Technology Based on the Physicochemical Theory."	
2003		George McClelland Whitesides	United States	"Contributions to Nanomaterials Science through the Development of Organic Molecular Self-Assembly Technique."	
2007	Hiroo Inokuchi		Japan	"Pioneering and Fundamental Contributions to Organic Molecular Electronics."	
2011		John Werner Cahn	United States	"Outstanding Contribution to Alloy Materials Engineering by the Establishment of Spinodal Decomposition Theory."	
2015	Toyoki Kunitake		Japan	"Pioneering Contributions to the Materials Sciences by Discovering Synthetic Bilayer Membranes and Creating the Field of Chemistry Based on Molecular Self-Assembly."	
2019		Ching W. Tang	Hong Kong; United States	"Pioneering Contributions to the Birth of High-Efficiency Organic Light-Emitting Diodes and Their Applications."	
2024		John Pendry	United Kingdom	"Contribution of the Theoretical Construction of Metamaterials to the Field of Material Science."	

=== Information Science ===
Year	Laureate		Country	Citation	Ref.
Year	Image	Name	Country	Citation	Ref.
1988		John McCarthy	United States	"Fundamental Contribution to the Field of Artificial Intelligence and the Invention of LISP, a Programming Language."	
1992		Maurice Vincent Wilkes	United Kingdom	"Building and Designing the First Practical Stored Program Computer and Pioneering Studies of Computer Architecture."	
1996		Donald Ervin Knuth	United States	"Outstanding Contribution to Various Fields of the Computer Science Ranging from the Art of Computer Programming to the Development of Epoch-Making Electronic Publishing Tools."	
2000		Antony Hoare	United Kingdom	"Pioneering and Fundamental Contributions to the Progress of Software Science."	
2004		Alan Curtis Kay	United States	"Creation of the concept of modern personal computing and contribution to its realization."	
2008		Richard Manning Karp	United States	"Fundamental Contributions to the Development of the Theory of Computational Complexity."	
2012		Ivan Edward Sutherland	United States	"Pioneering Achievements in the Development of Computer Graphics and Interactive Interfaces."	
2016		Takeo Kanade	United States	"Pioneering Contributions, both Theoretical and Practical, to Computer Vision and Robotics."	
2020	No award because of COVID-19 pandemic				
2021		Andrew Chi-Chih Yao	China	"Pioneering Contributions to a New Theory of Computation and Communication and a Fundamental Theory for its Security."	
2025		Shun-ichi Amari	Japan	"Pioneering Contributions to Opening Up Theoretical Foundations of Artificial Intelligence and Establishment of Information Geometry."	

== See also ==
- Kyoto Prize
- Kyoto Prize in Basic Sciences
- Kyoto Prize in Arts and Philosophy
- List of Kyoto Prize winners
- List of computer-related awards
- List of computer science awards
