= List of awards and honours received by Akira Kurosawa =

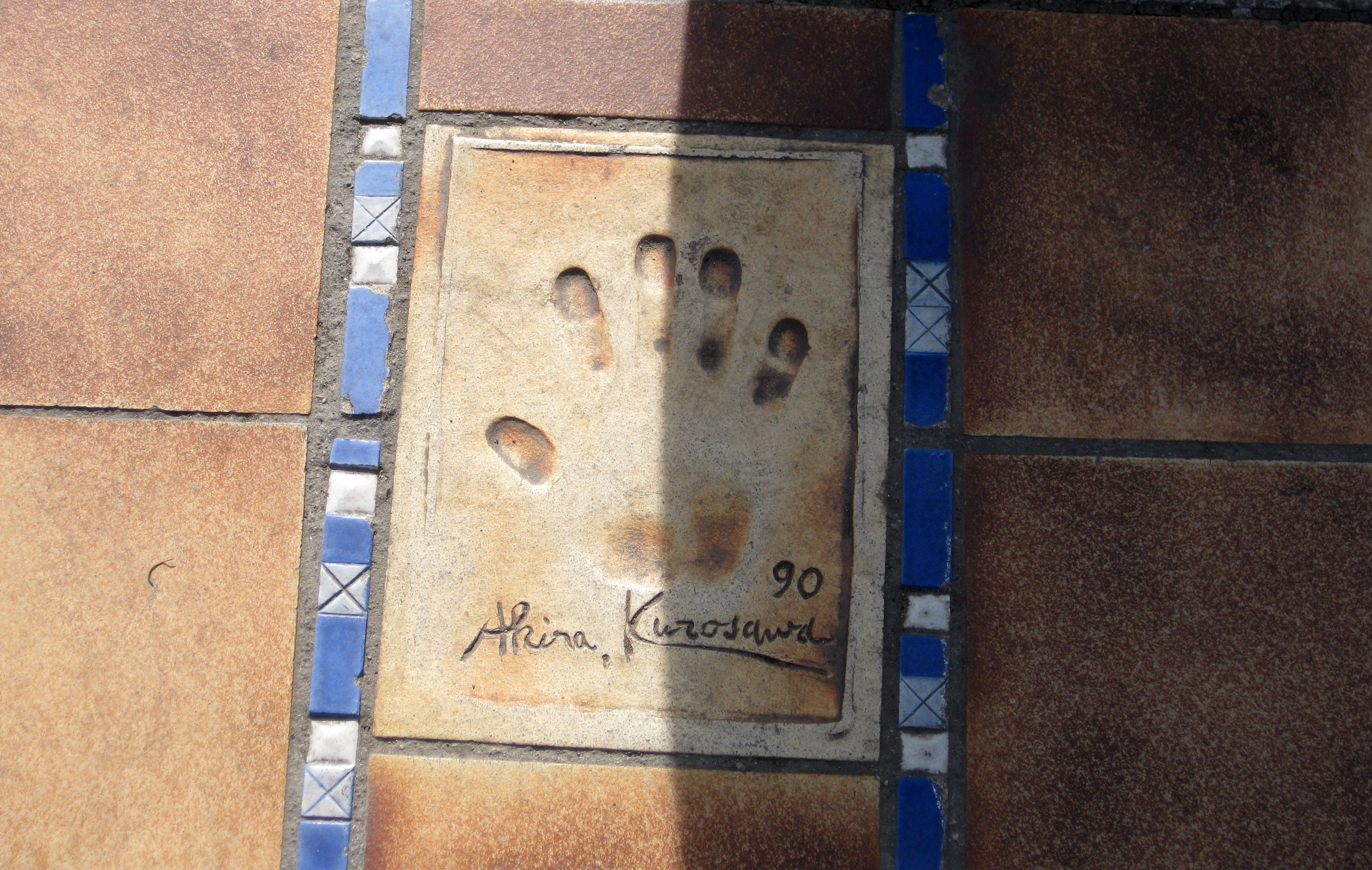
Akira Kurosawa's handprint in cement in Cannes, France, home of the Cannes Film Festival.

The following table is a selected list of awards and honors given to the Japanese film director Akira Kurosawa.

== Categories ==
The list represents three categories of film awards or honors:

- Best Film awards given to a Kurosawa-directed film, whether Kurosawa directly received the award or not (including "Foreign Film" awards);
- Best Director or Best Screenplay awards to Kurosawa for a Kurosawa-directed film;
- Career achievement awards.

For reasons of space, two categories of awards have been excluded from the table below:

- Nominations for awards given to either Kurosawa himself or to films he directed which he or the film did not subsequently win (e.g., the nomination of Throne of Blood for the Venice Film Festival Golden Lion award in 1957; his own nomination for Best Director for Ran at the 58th Academy Awards);
- Awards given to cast members of Kurosawa-directed films, or to crew members other than Kurosawa (e.g., Toshiro Mifune’s Best Actor prize for Yojimbo at the 1961 Venice Film Festival; Emi Wada’s Oscar for Ran at the 1985 Academy Awards).

== Data ==
The information in the table is derived from the IMDb Akira Kurosawa awards page and the IMDb awards pages for the individual films, supplemented by the filmography by Kurosawa’s biographer, Stuart Galbraith IV, unless otherwise noted.

Key: (NK) = Not known; (P) = Posthumous award

== Table ==
=== Film Awards ===
Year of award or honor (if known)	Name of award or honor	Awarding organization (if known)	Country of Origin	Given for...	Film title (if applicable)
(NK)	Sadao Yamanaka Prize	(NK)	Japan	Film	Sanshiro Sugata (1943)
(NK)	The National Incentive Film Prize [Shared with Torii Kyouemon]	(NK)	Japan	Film	Sanshiro Sugata
1948	Mainichi Film Concours	Mainichi Shimbun (newspaper)	Japan	Directing	One Wonderful Sunday (1947)
1949	Kinema Jumpo Award (Critics' Award)	Kinema Jumpo magazine	Japan	Film	Drunken Angel (1948)
1949	Mainichi Film Concours	Mainichi Shimbun	Japan	Film	Drunken Angel
(NK)	Geijutsusai (Arts Festival); Grand Prize	Ministry of Education	Japan	Film	Stray Dog (1949)
1951	Blue Ribbon Award	The Association of Tokyo; Film Journalists	Japan	Screenplay (with Shinobu Hashimoto)	Rashomon (1950)
1951	Golden Lion (First prize) (Note: First major international film prize won by a Japanese production.)	Venice Film Festival	Italy	Film	Rashomon
1951	NBR Award	National Board of Review	USA	Film, Directing	Rashomon
1952	Honorary Award - Outstanding; Foreign Language Film (Note: During this period, the Academy's foreign film award was given as an honorary award, non-competitively. It would become a competitive, annual award several years later.)	AMPAS (Academy Award)	USA	Film	Rashomon
1953	Kinema Jumpo Award	Kinema Jumpo magazine	Japan	Film	Ikiru (1952)
1953	Mainichi Film Concours	Mainichi Shimbun	Japan	Film, Screenplay (with Shinobu Hashimoto and Hideo Oguni)	Ikiru
(NK)	Arts Festival	Ministry of Education	Japan	Film	Ikiru
1954	Special Prize of the Senate of Berlin	Berlin Film Festival	West Germany	Film	Ikiru
1954	Silver Lion of St. Mark (Second Prize)	Venice Film Festival	Italy	Film	Seven Samurai (1954)
1959	Diploma of Merit	Jussi Award	Finland	Directing	Seven Samurai
1959	Blue Ribbon Award	The Association of Tokyo; Film Journalists	Japan	Film	The Hidden Fortress (1958)
1959	Silver Berlin Bear	Berlin Film Festival	West Germany	Directing	The Hidden Fortress
1959	FIPRESCI Prize	The International Federation of Film Critics (Berlin Film Festival)	West Germany	Film	The Hidden Fortress
1961	Golden Laurel Award	David O. Selznick	USA	Film	Ikiru
1964	Mainichi Film Concours	Mainichi Shimbun	Japan	Film, Screenplay (with Ryuzo Kikushima, Eijiro Hisaita and Hideo Oguni)	High and Low (1963)
1964	Golden Laurel Award	David O. Selznick	USA	Film	High and Low
1965	Asahi Culture Prize	Asahi Shimbun	Japan	Film	Red Beard (1965)
1965	Foreign Honorary Member	American Academy of Arts and Sciences	USA	Career	
1965	Journalism, Literature and Creative Communication Arts	Ramon Magsaysay Award	Philippines	Career	
1965	OCIC Award	OCIC (later Signis) (Venice Film Festival)	Italy	Directing	Red Beard
(NK)	Soviet Filmmakers'; Association Prize	Moscow Film Festival	USSR	Film	Red Beard
(NK)	Million Pearl Award	Tokyo Roei	Japan	Film	Red Beard
(NK)	NHK Award	NHK (broadcaster)	Japan	Film	Red Beard
1966	Blue Ribbon Award	The Association of Tokyo; Film Journalists	Japan	Film	Red Beard
1966	Mainichi Film Concours	Mainichi Shimbun	Japan	Film	Red Beard
1966	Kinema Jumpo Award	Kinema Jumpo magazine	Japan	Film; Directing	Red Beard
(NK)	Geijutsusai (Arts Festival); Prize for Excellence	Ministry of Education	Japan	Film	Dodesukaden (aka, Dodeskaden) (1970)
1975	Golden Prize	9th Moscow International Film Festival	USSR	Film	Dersu Uzala (1975)
1975	FIPRESCI Prize	The International Federation of Film Critics (Moscow Film Festival)	USSR	Film	Dersu Uzala
1976	Best Foreign Language Film	AMPAS (Academy Awards)	USA	Film	Dersu Uzala
1977	David	David di Donatello Awards	Italy	Directing	Dersu Uzala
1977	Silver Ribbon	Italian National Syndicate of Film Journalists	Italy	Film	Dersu Uzala
1978	Prix Léon Moussinac	Syndicate of French; Film Critics	France	Film	Dersu Uzala
1978	Golden Halo	Southern California Motion; Picture Council	USA	Film	Dersu Uzala
1979	Honorary Prize	11th Moscow International Film Festival	USSR	Career	-
1980	Palme d'Or (First Prize)	Cannes Film Festival	France	Film	Kagemusha (1980)
1980	Hochi Film Award	Hochi Shimbun (newspaper)	Japan	Film	Kagemusha
1981	Blue Ribbon Award	The Association of Tokyo; Film Journalists	Japan	Film	Kagemusha
1981	Mainichi Film Concours	Mainichi Shimbun	Japan	Film, Directing	Kagemusha
1981	Reader's Choice Award	Mainichi Shimbun	Japan	Film	Kagemusha
1981	César	César Awards	France	Film	Kagemusha
1981	David	David di Donatello Awards	Italy	Directing	Kagemusha
1981	BAFTA Film Award	BAFTA	UK	Directing	Kagemusha
1981	Silver Ribbon	Italian National Syndicate of Film Journalists	Italy	Directing	Kagemusha
1982	Career Golden Lion	Venice Film Festival	Italy	Career	-
1985	LAFCA Award	Los Angeles Film; Critics Association	USA	Film, Career	Ran (1985)
1985	NBR Award	National Board of Review	USA	Film, Directing	Ran
1985	OCIC Award	OCIC (later Signis) (San Sebastián Film Festival)	Spain	Film	Ran
1985	BSFC Award	Boston Society of Film Critics	USA	Film	Ran
1985	NFCC Award	New York Film Critics Circle	USA	Film	Ran
1986	NSFC Award	National Society of Film Critics	USA	Film	Ran
1986	Amanda Award	Norwegian International Film Festival	Norway	Film	Ran
1986	Blue Ribbon Award	The Association of Tokyo; Film Journalists	Japan	Film	Ran
1986	Bodil	Bodil Awards	Denmark	Film	Ran
1986	David	David di Donatello Awards	Italy	directing	Ran
1986	Mainichi Film Concours	Mainichi Shimbun	Japan	Film, Directing	Ran
1986	Golden Jubilee Award	Directors Guild of America	USA	Career	-
1986	Akira Kurosawa Award (Note: SFIFF's directing award, named for its first recipient, Akira Kurosawa, from 1986-2003. The award has since been renamed the Irving M. Levin Directing Award, in honor of the festival's founder)	San Francisco International; Film Festival	USA	Career	-
1987	BAFTA Film Award	BAFTA	UK	Film	Ran
1987	ALFS Award	London Film Critics' Circle	UK	Film, Directing	Ran
1989	Lifetime Achievement Award	Academy of Motion Picture Arts and Sciences; Academy Awards	USA	Career	
1990	Special Prize	Fukuoka Asian Culture Prize	Japan	Career	
1992	Lifetime Achievement Award	Directors Guild of America	USA	Career	
1994	Kyoto Prize in Arts and Philosophy	Inamori Foundation	Japan	Career	
1998	Special Award (for his work) (P)	Nikkan Sports Film Award	Japan	Career	-
1999	Lifetime Achievement Award (P)	Awards of the Japanese Academy	Japan	Career	-
1999	Blue Ribbon Award; Special Award (for his work) (P)	The Association of Tokyo; Film Journalists	Japan	Career	-
1999	Mainichi Film Concours; Special Award (for his work) (P)	Mainichi Shimbun	Japan	Career	-
1999	Asian of the Century Award (Arts, Literature and Culture) (P)	CNN; AsianWeek (US)	USA	Career	-

=== State and National Awards ===
Year of award	Name of Award	Native name	Country	Notes
1976	Person of Cultural Merit	文化功労者	Japan	
1981	Grand Officer of the Order of Merit of the Italian Republic	Grande Ufficiale Ordine al Merito della Repubblica Italiana	Italy	
1984	Officer of the Legion of Honour	Officier du Légion d'honneur	France	
1985	Order of Culture	文化勲章	Japan	
1985	Commander of the Order of Arts and Letters	Commandeur du Ordre des Arts et des Lettres	France	
1986	Knight Grand Cross of the Order of Merit of the Italian Republic	Cavaliere di Gran Croce Ordine al Merito della Repubblica Italiana	Italy	
1992	Praemium Imperiale	高松宮殿下記念世界文化賞	Japan	
1998	People's Honour Award	国民栄誉賞	Japan	(P)
1998	Junior Third Rank	従三位	Japan	(P)
