= Kyoto Prize in Basic Sciences =

The Kyoto Prize in Basic Sciences
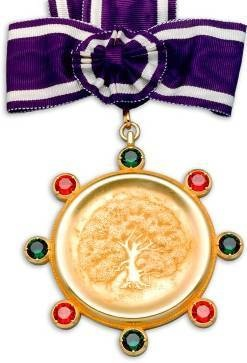
- Awarded for: Global achievement in Basic Sciences
- Country: Japan
- Presented by: Inamori Foundation
- First award: 1985
- Website: www.kyotoprize.org

The Kyoto Prize in Basic Sciences is awarded once a year by the Inamori Foundation. The Prize is one of three Kyoto Prize categories; the others are the Kyoto Prize in Advanced Technology and the Kyoto Prize in Arts and Philosophy. The first Kyoto Prize in Basic Sciences was awarded to Claude Elwood Shannon, the “Establishment of Mathematical Foundation of Information Theory”. The Prize is regarded as a prestigious award available in fields which are traditionally not honored with a Nobel Prize.

== Fields ==
The Kyoto Prize in Basic Sciences is awarded on a rotating basis to researchers in the following four fields:

- Mathematical sciences (including pure mathematics)
- Biological sciences (evolution, behavior, ecology, environment)
- Earth and planetary sciences, astronomy and astrophysics
- Cognitive science/Life sciences (molecular biology, cell biology, neurobiology)

== Laureates ==
Source: Kyoto Prize

=== Biological sciences ===
Year	Laureate		Country		
1986	–	George Evelyn Hutchinson	United States	1903–1991	Outstanding Contribution to Limnology and Community Ecology by Integrative Ecological Niche Theory
1990		Jane Goodall	United Kingdom	born 1934	Long-Term Study of Behavior, Sociology, and Ecology of Chimpanzees in the Wild
1993	–	William Donald Hamilton	United Kingdom	1936–2000	Proposal of Inclusive Fitness and the Establishment of Evolutionary Theory of Sociality and Cooperation
1997		Daniel Hunt Janzen	United States	born 1939	Pioneering Study of Biodiversity in Tropics and Its Maintenance Mechanisms
2001		John Maynard Smith	United Kingdom	1920–2004	Contribution to Evolutionary Biology by Proposing the Idea of the Evolutionarily Stable Strategy (ESS)
2005		Simon Asher Levin	United States	born 1941	Establishment of the field of spatial ecology and the proposition of the biosphere as a "complex adaptive system"
2009		Barbara Rosemary Grant	United Kingdom	born 1936	Demonstrating Rapid Evolution Caused by Natural Selection in Response to Environmental Changes
2009		Peter Raymond Grant	United Kingdom	born 1936	Demonstrating Rapid Evolution Caused by Natural Selection in Response to Environmental Changes
2013		Masatoshi Nei	United States	born 1931	Research on the Evolution of Biological Populations Using Quantitative Analyses of Genetic Variation and Evolutionary Time
2017		Graham Farquhar	Australia	born 1947	Development of Process-based Models of Photosynthesis and Their Contributions to the Science of Global Environmental Changes
2022		Bryan Grenfell	United States	born 1954	Development of an Innovative Methodology for Integrative Analysis of Pathogen Evolution and Epidemics.
2026		Farooq Azam	Pakistan; United States	born 1940	Elucidating the Role of “Microbial Loop” in Marine Carbon Cycling.

=== Mathematical sciences ===
Year	Laureate	Country		
1985	Claude Elwood Shannon	United States	1916–2001	Establishment of Mathematical Foundation of Information Theory
1989	Izrail Moiseevich Gelfand	Soviet Union	1913–2009	Outstanding Contribution to Many Fields of Mathematical Sciences, Especially Pioneering Studies in Functional Analysis
1994	André Weil	France	1906–1998	Broad Contribution to the Modern Mathematics, Especially through the Foundational Works in Algebraic Geometry and Number Theory
1998	Kiyoshi Itō	Japan	1915–2008	Fundamental Contribution to the Stochastic Analysis, through His Invention of Stochastic Differential Equations, Which Have Been Applied in Various Sciences
2002	Mikhail Gromov	France	born 1943	Contributions through dramatic developments in a range of mathematical fields by introducing the innovative method of a metric structure for families of various geometrical objects
2006	Hirotsugu Akaike	Japan	1927–2009	Major contribution to statistical science and modeling with the development of the Akaike Information Criterion (AIC)
2010	László Lovász	Hungary	born 1948	Outstanding Contributions to Mathematical Sciences Based on Discrete Optimization Algorithms
2014	Edward Witten	United States	born 1951	Outstanding Contributions to the Development of Mathematical Sciences through the Exploration of Superstring Theory
2018	Masaki Kashiwara	Japan	born 1947	Outstanding Contributions to a Broad Spectrum of Modern Mathematics: Advancement of D-module Theory from Its Foundation
2023	Elliott H. Lieb	United States	born 1932	Pioneering Mathematical Research in Physics, Chemistry, and Quantum Information Science Based on Many-Body Physics

=== Earth and planetary sciences, astronomy and astrophysics ===
Year	Laureate	Country		
1987	Jan Hendrik Oort	Netherlands	1900–1992	Outstanding Contribution to Astronomy by the Elucidation of Structure and Dynamics of the Galaxy
1991	Edward Norton Lorenz	United States	1917–2008	Outstanding Contribution to Earth Science and Mathematical Science by the Development of Theoretical Basis of Numerical Study in Meteorology and the Discovery of Deterministic Chaos
1995	Chūshirō Hayashi	Japan	1920–2010	Outstanding Contribution to Astrophysics through the Theoretical Studies of the Stellar Formation and Evolution and the Formation of Solar System
1999	Walter Heinrich Munk	United States	1917–2019	Outstanding Contribution to the Earth Science by the Elucidation of Dynamical Mechanism of Ocean and Its Waves
2003	Eugene Newman Parker	United States	1927–2022	Contributions to Astrophysics through the Elucidation of the Solar Wind and Cosmical Magnetohydrodynamic Phenomena
2007	Hiroo Kanamori	Japan	born 1936	Elucidation of Physical Processes of Earthquakes and Its Application to Hazard Mitigation
2011	Rashid Alievich Sunyaev	Russia; Germany	born 1943	Proposal of the Theory of Fluctuations in the Cosmic Microwave Background Radiation to Explore the Expanding Universe, and Outstanding Contribution to High-Energy Astronomy
2015	Michel Mayor	Switzerland	born 1942	Outstanding Contributions in Evolving a New Vision of the Universe through the Discovery of Extrasolar Planet
2019	James E. Gunn	United States	born 1938	Outstanding Contributions to the Elucidation of Cosmic History Based on a Large-Scale Wide-Field Observation.
2024	Paul F. Hoffman	Canada	born 1941	Proving Snowball Earth Accelerating Life Evolution and Plate Tectonics Dating Back to the First Half of Earth's History.

=== Life sciences ===
Year	Laureate	Country		
1992	Yasutomi Nishizuka	Japan	1932–2004	Elucidation of Intracellular Signal Transduction System through the Discovery and Functional Analysis of the Protein Kinase C
1996	Mario Renato Capecchi	United States	born 1937	Production of Knockout Mice through the Development of Gene Targeting Technique and Outstanding Contribution to Elucidation of Gene Function
2000	Walter Jakob Gehring	Switzerland	born 1939	Discovery of Conserved Developmental Mechanisms
2004	Alfred G. Knudson	United States	1922–2016	Seminal contribution to the establishment of the theory of the tumor suppressor gene in the mechanism of human carcinogenesis
2008	Anthony James Pawson	Canada; United Kingdom	1952–2013	Proposing and Proving the Concept of Adapter Molecules in the Signal Transduction
2012	Yoshinori Ohsumi	Japan	born 1945	Outstanding Contribution to Elucidating the Molecular Mechanisms and Physiological Significance of Autophagy, a Cellular Adaptive System to Environment
2016	Tasuku Honjo	Japan	born 1942	Discovery of the Mechanism Responsible for the Functional Diversification of Antibodies, Immunoregulatory Molecules and Clinical Applications of PD-1
2020	No award because of COVID-19 pandemic			
2021	Robert G. Roeder	United States	born 1942	Discovery of the Principle of Gene Transcription Mechanisms in Eukaryotes
2025	Azim Surani	United Kingdom	born 1945	Discovery of Genomic Imprinting in Mammals and Elucidation of Its Molecular Mechanisms.

=== Cognitive science ===
Year	Laureate	Country		
1988	Avram Noam Chomsky	United States	born 1928	Creation of the Theory of Generative Grammar and Substantial Contribution to the Formation and Development of Cognitive Science

== See also ==
- Kyoto Prize
- Kyoto Prize in Advanced Technology
- Kyoto Prize in Arts and Philosophy
- List of Kyoto Prize winners
- List of astronomy awards
- List of biology awards
- List of mathematics awards
