= Fukumi =

Fukumi (written: 福見 or 福美) is both a Japanese surname and a feminine Japanese given name. Notable people with the name include:

- Tomoko Fukumi (福見 友子, born 1985), Japanese judoka
- Fukumi Kuroda (黒田 福美, born 1956), Japanese actress
- Fukumi Shimura (志村 ふくみ, born 1924), Japanese textile artist
