= Zhores Alferov =

Russian physicist (1930–2019)

- Жорес Алфёров
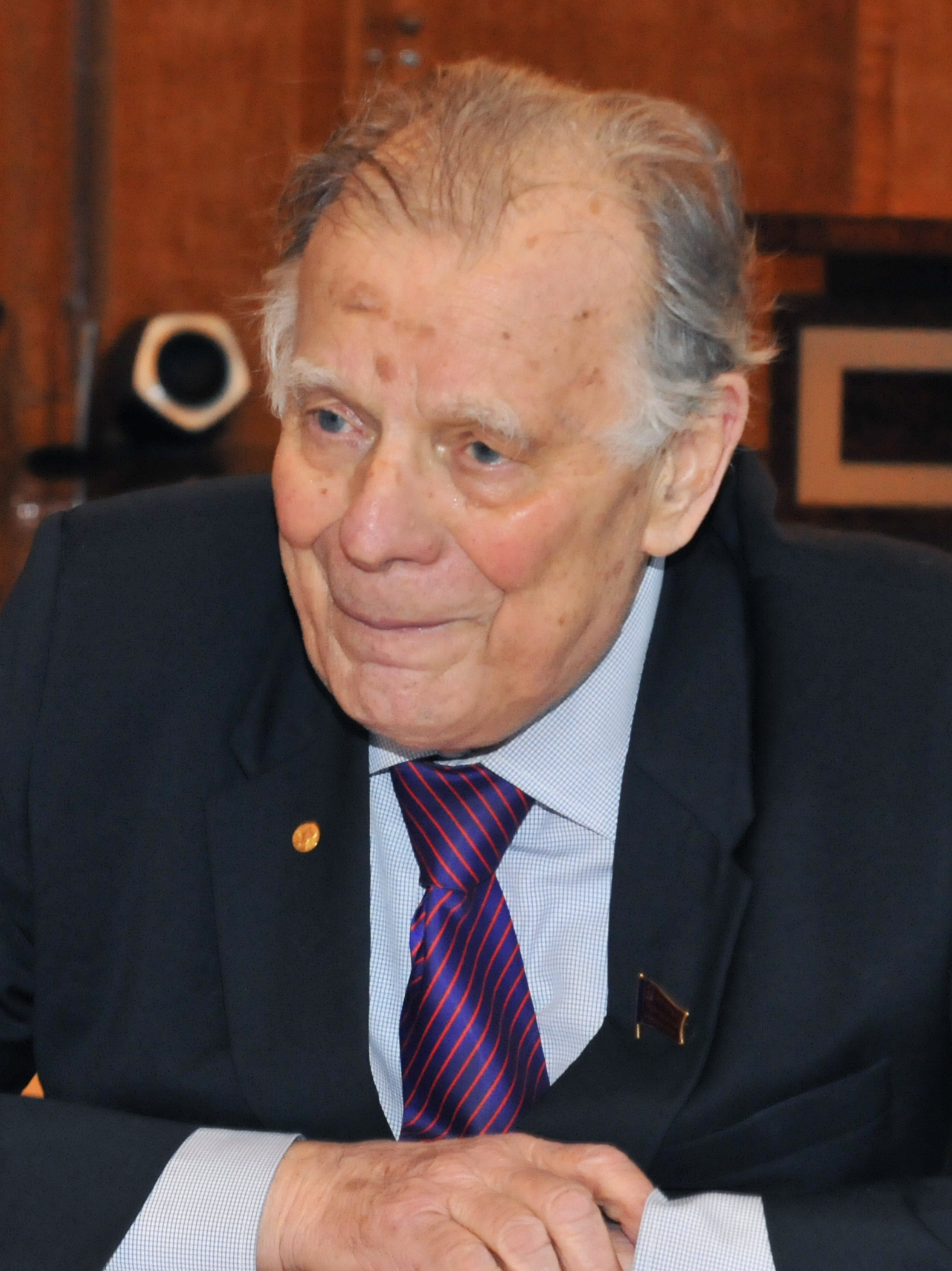
- Alferov in 2016

Member of the State Duma (Party List Seat)
- In office 17 January 1996 – 1 March 2019
- Succeeded by: Mikhail Berulava

Personal details
- Born: Zhores Ivanovich Alferov; 15 March 1930 Vitebsk, Soviet Union
- Died: 1 March 2019 (aged 88) Saint Petersburg, Russia
- Party: NDR (1995–1999); CPRF (1999–2019)
- Spouse: Tamara Darskaya
- Children: 2
- Education: V. I. Ulyanov Electrotechnical Institute: Specialist, Vacuum Electronics; Ioffe Institute: Candidate, Technology; Doctor, Physics and Mathematics
- Known for: Laser diode; Thin-film solar cell
- Awards: Stuart Ballantine Medal (1971); EPS Europhysics Prize (1978); Demidov Prize (1999); Nobel Prize in Physics (2000); Nick Holonyak, Jr. Award (2000); Kyoto Prize in Advanced Technology (2001); State Prize of the Russian Federation (2001); SPIE Gold Medal (2002); Global Energy Prize (2005)
- Scientific career
- Fields: Physics
- Workplaces: Ioffe Institute; V. I. Ulyanov Electrotechnical Institute; Kalinin Polytechnical Institute; Academy of Sciences of the Soviet Union
- Thesis: Гетеропереходы в полупроводниках (1970)
- Doctoral students: Dmitri Z. Garbuzov

Zhores Ivanovich Alferov (Note: Russian: Жорес Иванович Алфёров, pronounced [ʐɐˈrɛs ɨˈvanəvʲɪtɕ ɐlˈfʲɵrəf]) (15 March 1930 – 1 March 2019) was a Soviet and Russian physicist who contributed significantly to the creation of modern heterostructure physics and electronics. In 2000, Alferov shared the Nobel Prize in Physics for the development of the semiconductor heterojunction for optoelectronics. He also became a politician in his later life, serving in the State Duma as a member of the Communist Party from 1999.

== Biography ==
Zhores Ivanovich Alferov was born on 15 March 1930 in Vitebsk, Byelorussian Soviet Socialist Republic, Soviet Union, the son of Anna Vladimirovna Alferova and Ivan Karpovich Alferov. He studied in the Faculty of Electronic Engineering at V. I. Ulyanov Electrotechnical Institute (LETI – now Saint Petersburg Electrotechnical University), graduating in 1952 with a specialization in Vacuum Electronics. The following year, he joined the staff of the Ioffe Institute, where he received a Candidate of Sciences in Technology in 1961 and a Doctor of Sciences in Physics and Mathematics in 1970. Alferov became Director of the Ioffe Institute in 1987.

Alferov was elected a Corresponding Member of the Academy of Sciences of the Soviet Union in 1972, and a full member in 1979. In 1973, he was appointed to the Chair of Optoelectronics at LETI, and became Dean of the Faculty of Physics and Technology at the Kalinin Polytechnical Institute (now Peter the Great St. Petersburg Polytechnic University) in 1988. From 1989, he was Vice-President of the Academy of Sciences and President of its Saint Petersburg Scientific Center.

== Research ==
Alferov worked with a group led by Vladimir Tuchkevich, who became director of the Ioffe Institute in 1967, on planar semiconductor amplifiers for use in radio receivers. These planar semiconductor amplifiers would be referred to as transistors in the present day. His contribution included work on germanium diodes for use as a rectifier.

In the early 1960s, Alferov organized an effort at Ioffe Institute to develop semiconductor heterostructures. Heterojunction transistors enabled higher frequency use than their homojunction predecessors, and this capability plays a key role in modern mobile phone and satellite communications. Alferov and colleagues worked on GaAs and AlAs III-V heterojunctions. A particular focus was the use of heterojunctions to create semiconductor lasers capable of lasing at room temperature. In 1963, Alferov filed a patent application proposing double-heterostructure lasers; Herbert Kroemer independently filed a US patent several months later. In 1966, Alferov's lab created the first lasers based on heterostructures, although they did not lase continuously. Then in 1968, Alferov and coworkers produced the first continuous-wave semiconductor heterojunction laser operating at room temperature. This achievement came a month ahead of Izuo Hayashi and Morton B. Panish of Bell Labs also producing a continuous-wave room-temperature heterojunction laser.

It was for this work that Alferov received the 2000 Nobel Prize in Physics together with Herbert Kroemer "for developing semiconductor heterostructures used in high-speed- and opto-electronics."

In the 1960s and 1970s Alferov continued his work on the physics and technology of semiconductor heterostructures in his lab at the Ioffe Institute. His investigations of injection properties of semiconductors and his contributions to the development of lasers, solar cells, LEDs, and epitaxy processes led to the creation of modern heterojunction physics and electronics. The development of semiconductor heterojunctions revolutionized semiconductor design, and had a range of immediate commercial applications—including LEDs, barcode readers, and CDs. Hermann Grimmeiss of the Royal Swedish Academy of Sciences, which awards Nobel Prizes, said: "Without Alferov, it would not be possible to transfer all the information from satellites down to the Earth or to have so many telephone lines between cities."

Alferov had an almost messianic conception of heterostructures, writing: "Many scientists have contributed to this remarkable progress, which not only determines in large measure the future prospects of solid state physics but in a certain sense affects the future of human society as well."

== Scientific administration ==
In 1987, Alferov became the fifth director of the Ioffe Institute. In 1989, Alferov gained the administrative position of chairman of the Leningrad Scientific Center, now referred to as the St. Petersburg Scientific Center. In the Leningrad region, this scientific center is an overarching organization comprising 70 institutions, organizations, enterprises, and scientific societies.

Alferov worked to foster relationships between early educational institutions and scientific research institutions to train the next generation of scientists, citing Peter the Great's vision for the Russian Academy of Sciences to be organized with a scientific research core in close contact with a gymnasium (secondary school). In 1987, Alferov and colleagues at the Ioffe Institute established a secondary school in Saint Petersburg, the School of Physics and Technology, under the umbrella of the Ioffe charter. In 1997 Alferov founded the Research and Education Center at the Ioffe Institute and in 2002, this center officially became the Saint Petersburg Academic University after gaining a charter to award masters and PhD degrees.

In the 2000s, through his role in academic administration and in parliament, Alferov advocated for and worked to advance Russia's nanotechnology sector. The primary research charter of the Saint Petersburg Academic University, which Alferov founded, was the development of nanotechnology. Alferov provided a consistent voice in parliament in favor of increased scientific funding. In 2006, Prime Minister Mikhail Fradkov announced the creation of a federal agency, Rosnanotekh, to pursue nanotechnology applications.

== Political career ==
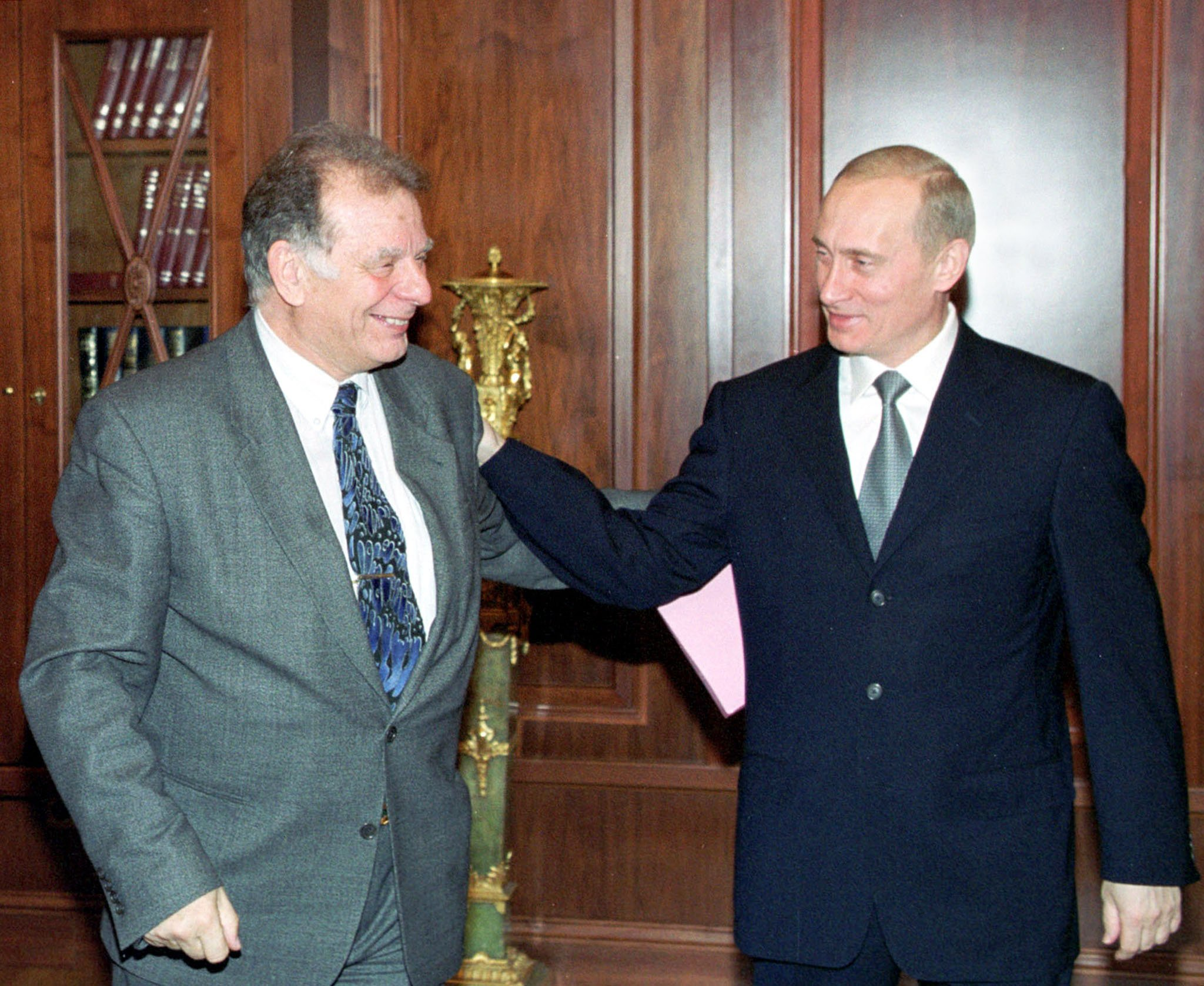
Alferov meeting President Vladimir Putin at the Kremlin, 2000

Alferov was elected to the Russian Parliament, the State Duma, in 1995 as a deputy for the political party Our Home – Russia, generally considered to be supportive of the policies of President Boris Yeltsin. In 1999, he was elected again, this time on the list of the Communist Party of the Russian Federation. He was re-elected in 2003 and again in 2007, when he was placed second on the party's federal electoral list behind Gennady Zyuganov and ahead of Nikolai Kharitonov, even though he was not a member of the party.

== Non-profit service ==
Alferov served on the advisory council of CRDF Global.

== Personal life ==
He was married to Tamara Darskaya. Together they had two children; a son, Ivan, and a daughter, Olga.

Alferov was an atheist and expressed objections to religious education. He was one of the signers of the open letter to President Vladimir Putin from members of the Russian Academy of Sciences against clericalization of Russia.

== Death ==
Since November 2018, Alferov suffered from hypertensive emergency. He died on 1 March 2019 in Saint Petersburg at the age of 88.

== In popular culture ==
The song «World That Was Made By Alferov» by Leningrad Nights from the fourth album Physics (2025) is dedicated to Zhores Alferov.

== Recognition ==
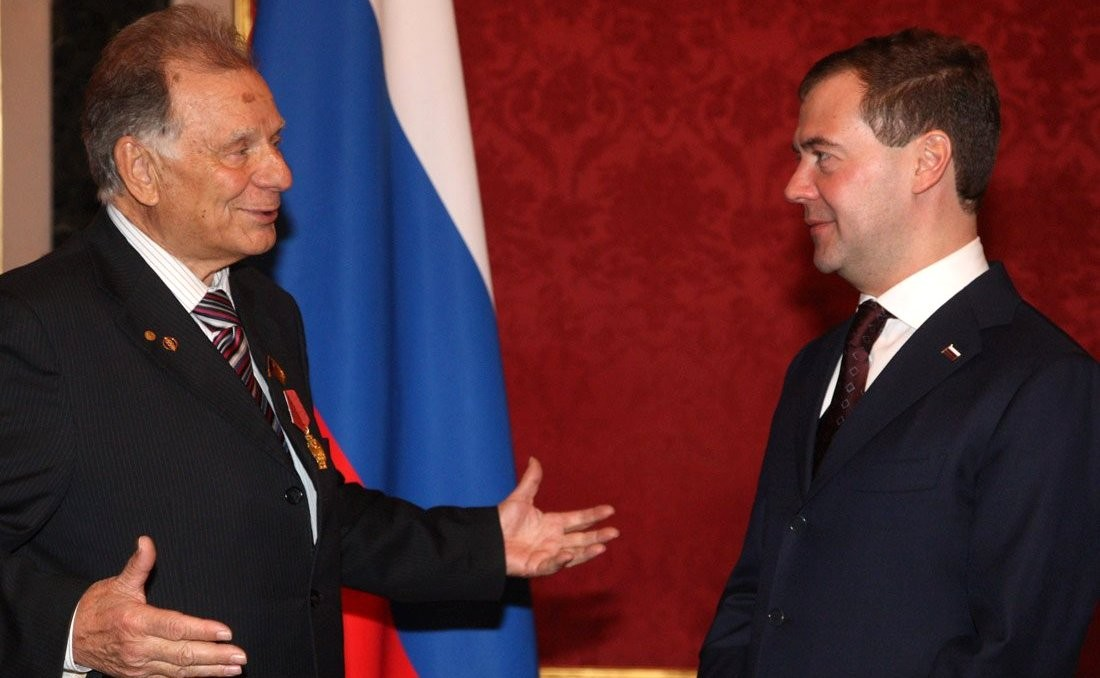
With Dmitry Medvedev, 15 March 2010

=== International awards ===
Year	Organization	Award	Co-recipients	Citation	Ref.
1971	Franklin Institute	Stuart Ballantine Medal	—	"For the double-heterostructure injection laser."	
1978	European Physical Society	EPS Europhysics Prize	—	"For heterojunctions."	
2000	Royal Swedish Academy of Sciences	Nobel Prize in Physics	Jack Kilby and Herbert Kroemer	"For developing semiconductor heterostructures used in high-speed- and opto-electronics."	
2000	Optical Society of America	Nick Holonyak, Jr. Award	—	"For his original investigations of heterostructure injection lasers and cw room temperature semiconductor lasers."	
2001	Inamori Foundation	Kyoto Prize in Advanced Technology	Izuo Hayashi and Morton B. Panish	"A Pioneering Step in the Development of Optoelectronics through Success in Continuous Operation of Semiconductor Lasers at Room Temperature."	
2002	SPIE	SPIE Gold Medal	—	—	
2005	Global Energy Association	Global Energy Prize	—	"For research and practical contribution to creation of semi-conductor energy converters for use in solar and electrical energy applications."	

=== Russian awards ===
Year	Institution	Award	Citation	Ref.
1999	Demidov Science Foundation	Demidov Prize	"Outstanding contributions to the physics of semiconductors and semiconductor quantum electronics"	
2001	Russian Academy of Sciences, Government of the Russian Federation	State Prize of the Russian Federation	"Fundamental research into the processes of formation and properties of heterostructures with quantum dots and developing lasers based on them"	

=== Memberships ===
Year	Organization	Type	Ref.
1990	National Academy of Sciences	International Member	
1990	National Academy of Engineering	International Member	
2001	Optical Society of America	Optica Fellow	

== See also ==
- List of Jewish Nobel laureates
- List of members of the State Duma of Russia who died in office
