= Hard hadronic reaction =

Hadron processes that can be calculated perturbatively

Hard hadronic reactions are hadron reactions in which the main role is played by quarks and gluons and which are well described by perturbation theory in QCD.

All hadrons discovered so far fit into the standard picture, in which they are colorless composite particles built from quarks and antiquarks. The characteristic energies associated with this internal quark structure (that is, the characteristic binding energies in potential models) are of the order of $Q_0 = 1$ GeV. There is a natural classification of hadron collision processes:

- if the momentum transfer is significantly less than $Q_0$, then the dynamics of the internal degrees of freedom of the hadrons is insignificant, and the theory can be reformulated as an effective hadron theory.
- if the momentum transfer during scattering is substantially greater than this magnitude, then this is a hard hadron reaction.

In this case, good accuracy hadrons can be considered weakly coupled, and scattering occurs between the individual components of rapidly moving hadrons - partons. This behavior is called asymptotic freedom and is primarily associated with a decrease in the strong interaction constant with an increase in the transfer of momentum (for this discovery the 2004 Nobel Prize in Physics was awarded).

== Literature ==
- Greiner, Walter; Schäfer, Andreas (1994). Quantum Chromodynamics. Springer. ISBN 978-0-387-57103-4.
- Halzen, Francis; Martin, Alan (1984). Quarks & Leptons: An Introductory Course in Modern Particle Physics. John Wiley & Sons. ISBN 978-0-471-88741-6.
- Creutz, Michael (1985). Quarks, Gluons and Lattices. Cambridge University Press. ISBN 978-0-521-31535-7.
