= George H. Heilmeier =

American engineer and businessman (1936-2014)

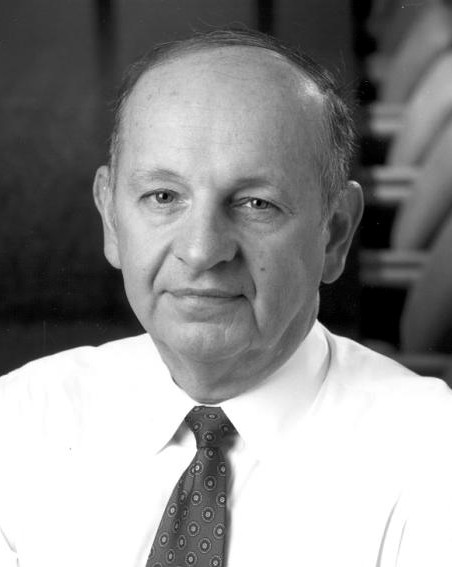
- Born: May 22, 1936; Philadelphia, Pennsylvania, U.S.
- Died: April 21, 2014 (aged 77); Plano, Texas, U.S.
- Education: Princeton University (PhD, MS, MA); University of Pennsylvania (BS)
- Awards: IEEE Founders Medal (1986); National Medal of Science (1991); IRI Medal (1993); IEEE Medal of Honor (1997); John Fritz Medal (1999); Kyoto Prize (2005)
- Scientific career
- Fields: Electrical engineering

George Harry Heilmeier (May 22, 1936 – April 21, 2014) was an American engineer, manager, and a pioneering contributor to liquid crystal displays (LCDs), for which he was inducted into the National Inventors Hall of Fame. Heilmeier's work is an IEEE Milestone.

== Biography ==
Heilmeier was born in Philadelphia, Pennsylvania, graduated from Abraham Lincoln High School there, received his BS in Electrical Engineering from the University of Pennsylvania in Philadelphia, and his M.S.E., M.A., and Ph.D. degrees in solid state materials and electronics from Princeton University.

Dr. Heilmeier, the son of a janitor, was the first member of his family to finish high school. His daughter, Beth Jarvie, said “it was the Christian character of my dad” as well as his ability to put his head down and push forward with the work at hand that played major roles in his contributions.

In 1958 Heilmeier joined RCA Laboratories in Princeton, New Jersey, where he worked on parametric amplification, tunnel diode down-converters, millimeter wave generation, ferroelectric thin film devices, organic semiconductors and electro-optic effects in molecular and liquid crystals. In 1964 he discovered several new electro-optic effects in liquid crystals, which led to the first working liquid crystal displays based on what he called the dynamic scattering mode (DSM).

Heilmeier spent much of the 1970s in the United States Department of Defense. In 1970–71, he served as a White House Fellow and special assistant to the Secretary of Defense, performing long-range research and development planning. In 1971 he was appointed Assistant Director for Defense Research and Engineering, Electronic and Physical Sciences, overseeing all research and exploratory development in electronics and the physical sciences. In 1975 he was named Director of the Defense Advanced Research Projects Agency (DARPA) and initiated major efforts in stealth aircraft, space-based lasers, space-based infrared technology, and artificial intelligence.

In December 1977 Heilmeier left government to become vice president at Texas Instruments; in 1983 he was promoted to Chief Technical Officer. From 1991 to 1996, he was president and CEO of Bellcore (now Telcordia), ultimately overseeing its sale to Science Applications International Corporation (SAIC). He served as the company's chairman and CEO from 1996 to 1997, and afterwards as its chairman emeritus.

Heilmeier had received numerous awards, held 15 patents, and was a member of the National Academy of Engineering, the Defense Science Board, and the National Security Agency Advisory Board. He served on the board of trustees of Fidelity Investments and of Teletech Holdings, and the Board of Overseers of the School of Engineering and Applied Science of the University of Pennsylvania. He died of a stroke in 2014 at the age of 77.

== Heilmeier's Catechism ==
A set of questions credited to Heilmeier that anyone proposing a research project or product development effort should be able to answer.

- What are you trying to do? Articulate your objectives using absolutely no jargon.
- How is it done today, and what are the limits of current practice?
- What's new in your approach and why do you think it will be successful?
- Who cares? If you're successful, what difference will it make?
- What are the risks and the payoffs?
- How much will it cost?
- How long will it take?
- What are the midterm and final "exams" to check for success?

== Selected awards ==
- 1976 IEEE David Sarnoff Award, IEEE
- 1990 C&C Prize
- 1991 National Medal of Science, US
- 1992 National Academy of Engineering Founders Award, US
- 1993 IRI Medal from the Industrial Research Institute, US
- 1993 Vladimir Karapetoff Eminent Members' Award, Eta Kappa Nu
- 1996 John Scott Award, City of Philadelphia
- 1997 IEEE Medal of Honor, IEEE
- 1999 John Fritz Medal, American Association of Engineering Societies
- 2005 Kyoto Prize in advanced technology, Inamori Foundation
- 2006 Edwin H. Land Medal
- 2012 Charles Stark Draper Prize, National Academy of Engineering

== Selected publications ==
- 1966 "Possible Ferroelectric Effects in Liquid Crystals and Related Liquids" (Williams, R. and Heilmeier, G. H.), Journal of Chemical Physics, 44: 638.
- 1968 "Dynamic Scattering: A New Electrooptic Effect in Certain Classes of Nematic Liquid Crystals" (with Zanoni, L. A. and Barton, L. A.), Proceedings of the IEEE, 56: 1162.
- 1970 "Liquid Crystal Display Devices", Scientific American, 222: 100.
- 1976 "Liquid Crystal Displays: An Experiment in Interdisciplinary Research that Worked", IEEE Transactions on Electron Devices, ED-23: 780.

Government offices
Preceded by Stephen J. Lukasik	Director of DARPA; 1975–1977	Succeeded by Robert R. Fossum
