= Peter and Rosemary Grant =

Married couple of British evolutionary biologists

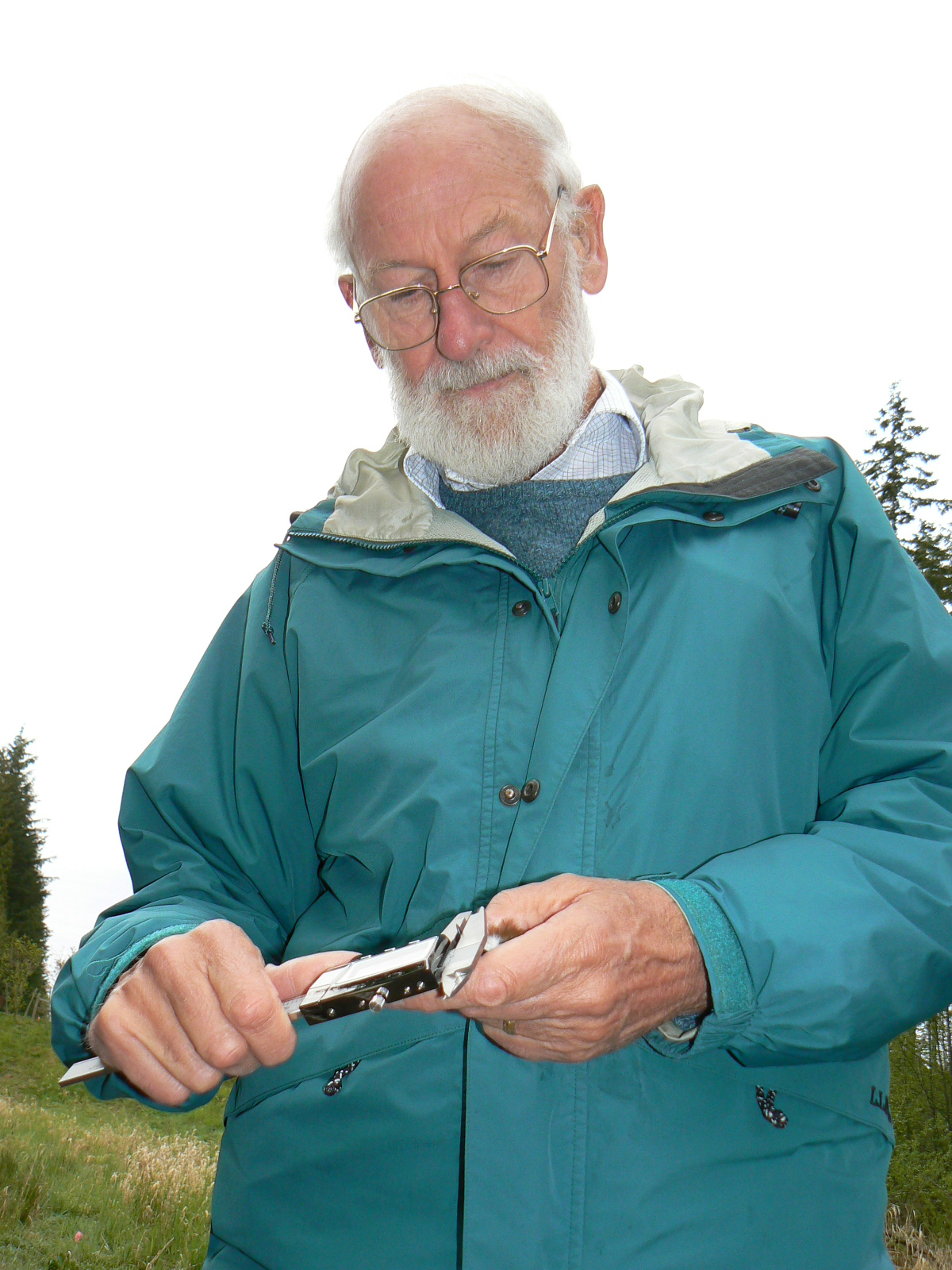
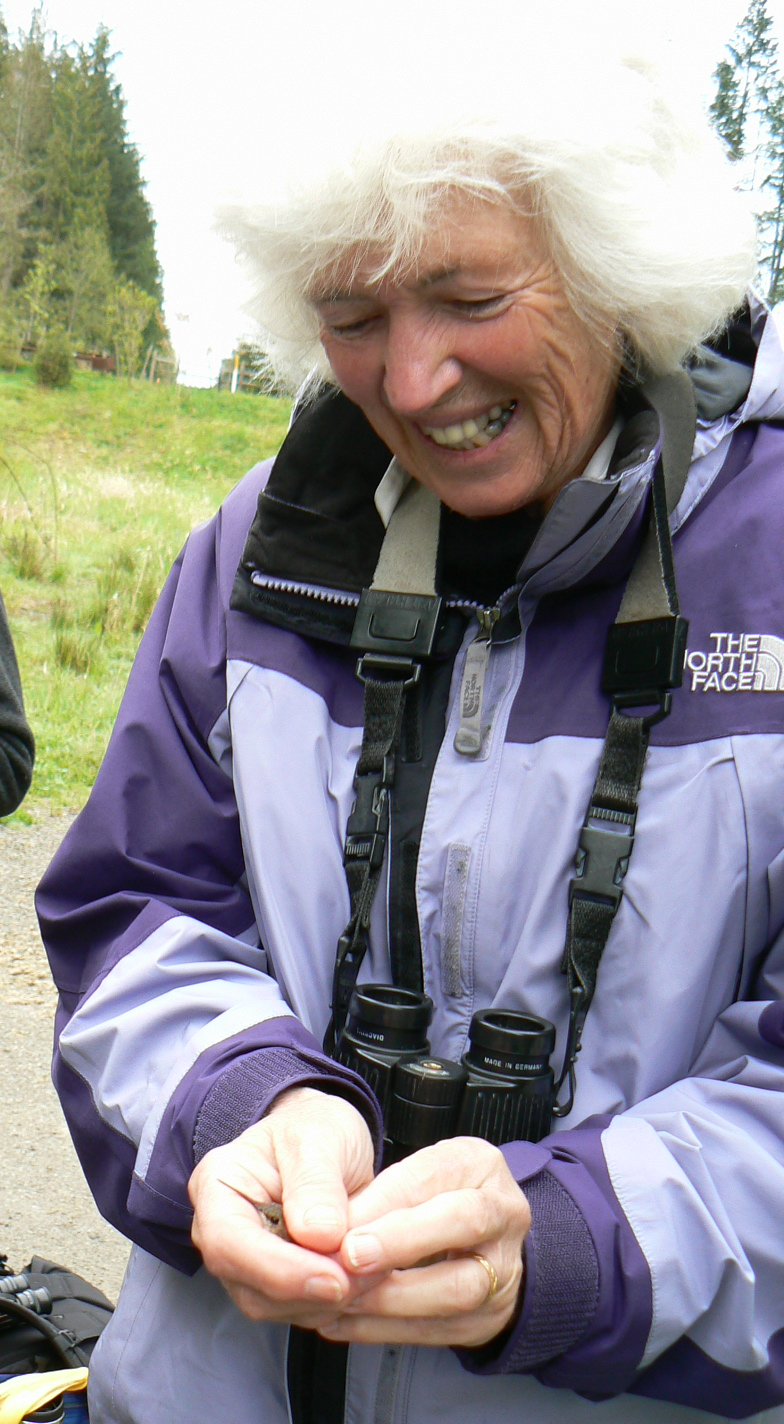
Peter and Rosemary Grant studying birds in 2007

Peter Raymond Grant FRS FRSC (born 26 October 1936) and Barbara Rosemary Grant FRS FRSC (born 8 October 1936) are a British married couple who are evolutionary biologists at Princeton University. Each currently holds the position of emeritus professor. They are known for their work with Darwin's finches on Daphne Major, one of the Galápagos Islands. Since 1973, the Grants have spent six months of every year capturing, tagging, and taking blood samples from finches on the island. They have worked to show that natural selection can be seen within a single lifetime, or even within a couple of years. Charles Darwin originally thought that natural selection was a long, drawn out process but the Grants have shown that these changes in populations can happen very quickly.

In 1994, they were awarded the Leidy Award from the Academy of Natural Sciences of Philadelphia. The Grants were the subject of the book The Beak of the Finch: A Story of Evolution in Our Time by Jonathan Weiner, which won the Pulitzer Prize for General Nonfiction in 1995.

In 2003, the Grants were joint recipients of the Loye and Alden Miller Research Award. They won the 2005 Balzan Prize for Population Biology. The Balzan Prize citation states:

Peter and Rosemary Grant are distinguished for their remarkable long-term studies demonstrating evolution in action in Galápagos finches. They have demonstrated how very rapid changes in body and beak size in response to changes in the food supply are driven by natural selection. They have also elucidated the mechanisms by which new species arise and how genetic diversity is maintained in natural populations. The work of the Grants has had a seminal influence in the fields of population biology, evolution, and ecology.

The Grants are both fellows of the Royal Society, Peter in 1987, and Rosemary in 2007. In 2008, the Grants were among the thirteen recipients of the Darwin-Wallace Medal, which is bestowed every fifty years by the Linnean Society of London. In 2009, they were recipients of the annual Kyoto Prize in basic sciences, an international award honouring significant contributions to the scientific, cultural and spiritual betterment of mankind. In 2017, they received the Royal Medal in Biology "for their research on the ecology and evolution of Darwin's finches on the Galapagos, demonstrating that natural selection occurs frequently and that evolution is rapid as a result".

== Early years ==
Barbara Rosemary Grant was born in Arnside, England in 1936. In her youth, she collected plant fossils and compared them to living look-alikes. At the age of 12, she read Darwin's On the Origin of Species. Despite being told by her headmistress that pursuing an education in a male-dominated field of study would be foolish, in addition to contracting a serious case of mumps that temporarily stalled her academic activity, she decided to continue forth with her education. In 1960, she graduated from the University of Edinburgh with a degree in Zoology. For the next year, she studied genetics under Conrad Waddington and later devised a dissertation to study isolated populations of fish. This project was put on hold when she accepted a biology teaching job at the University of British Columbia, where she met Peter Grant.

Peter Raymond Grant was born in 1936 in London, but relocated to the English countryside to avoid encroaching bombings during World War II. He attended school at the Surrey-Hampshire border, where he collected botanical samples, as well as insects. He attended the University of Cambridge and later moved to Vancouver, British Columbia, Canada, and began work on a doctoral degree in Zoology at the University of British Columbia. Peter met Rosemary after beginning his research there, and after a year, the two wedded.

== Education and career ==
=== Peter Grant ===
- BA (Hons) – Cambridge University- 1960
- PhD – University of British Columbia- 1964
- Post-doctoral fellowship – Yale University- 1964–1965
- Assistant Professor – McGill University- 1965–1968
- Associate Professor – McGill University- 1968–1973
- Full Professor – McGill University- 1973–1977
- Professor – University of Michigan- 1977–1985
- Visiting Professor – Uppsala and Lund University – 1981, 1985
- Professor – Princeton University- 1985
- Class of 1877 Professor of Zoology- Princeton University- 1989
- Professor of Zoology Emeritus – Princeton University- 2008

=== Rosemary Grant ===
- BSc (Hons), University of Edinburgh, 1960
- PhD (Evolutionary Biology), Uppsala University, 1985
- Research Associate, Yale University, 1964
- Research Associate, McGill University, 1973
- Research Associate, University of Michigan, 1977
- Research Scholar and lecturer, Princeton University, 1985
- Senior Research Scholar with rank of professor, Princeton University, 1997
- Senior Research Scholar with rank of professor emeritus, Princeton University, 2008

== Research ==
For his doctoral degree, Peter Grant studied the relationship between ecology and evolution and how they were interrelated. The Grants travelled to the Tres Marias Islands off Mexico to conduct field studies of the birds that inhabited the island. They compared the differences of bill length to body size between populations living on the Islands and the nearby mainland. Of the birds studied, eleven species were not significantly different between the mainland and the islands; four species were significantly less variable on the islands, and one species was significantly more variable. On average, the birds on the islands had larger beaks. The Grants attributed these differences to what foods were available, and what was available was dependent on competitors. The bigger beaks indicated a greater range of foods present in the environment.

In 1965, Peter Grant accepted tenure at McGill University in Montreal. He created a method to test the Competition Hypothesis to see if it worked today as it did in the past. This research was done on grassland voles and woodland mice. The study looked at the competitiveness between populations of rodents and among rodent species. In his article "Interspecific Competition Among Rodents", he concluded that competitive interaction for space is common among many rodent species, not just the species that have been studied in detail. Grant also states that there are many causes for increased competition: reproduction, resources, amount of space, and invasion of other species.

Daphne Major, in the Galápagos Islands, was a perfect place to perform experiments and study changes within birds. It was isolated and uninhabited; any changes that were to occur to the land and environment would be due to natural forces with no human destruction. The island provided the best environment to study natural selection; seasons of heavy rain switched to seasons of extended drought. With these environmental changes brought changes in the types of foods available to the birds. The Grants would study this for the next few decades of their lives.

In 1973, the Grants headed out on what they thought would be a two-year study on the island of Daphne Major. There they would study evolution and ultimately determine what drives the formation of new species. There are thirteen species of finch that live on the islands; five of these are tree finch, one warbler finch, one vegetarian finch, and six species of ground finch. These birds provide a great way to study adaptive radiation. Their beaks are specific to the type of diet they eat, which in turn is reflective of the food available. The finches are easy to catch and provide a good animal to study. The Grants tagged, labelled, measured, and took blood samples of the birds they were studying. The two-year study continued through 2012.

During the rainy season of 1977 only 24 millimetres of rain fell. Two of the main finch species were hit exceptionally hard and many of them died. The lack of rain caused major food sources to become scarce, causing the need to find alternative food sources. The smaller, softer seeds ran out, leaving only the larger, tougher seeds. The finch species with smaller beaks struggled to find alternate seeds to eat. The following two years suggested that natural selection could happen very rapidly. Because the smaller finch species could not eat the large seeds, they died off. Finches with larger beaks were able to eat the seeds and reproduce. The population in the years following the drought in 1977 had "measurably larger" beaks than had the previous birds.

In 1981, the Grants came across a bird they had never seen before. It was heavier than the other ground finches by more than five grams. They called this bird Big Bird. It had many different characteristics than those of the native finches: a strange call, extra glossy feathers, it could eat both large and small seeds, and could also eat the nectar, pollen, and seeds of the cacti that grow on the island. Although hybrids do happen, many of the birds living on the island tend to stick within their own species. Big Bird lived for thirteen years, initially interbreeding with local species. His descendants have only mated within themselves for the past thirty years, a total of seven generations.

Big Bird was originally assumed to be an immigrant from the island of Santa Cruz. However, in 2015, whole genome analysis linked its descent to a bird that originated on Española Island, more than 100 kilometers from Daphne Major, the Española cactus finch (G. conirostris). Descendants of G. conirostris and local finches (G. fortis) have become a distinct species, the first example of speciation to be directly observed by scientists in the field. Whole genome studies have enabled scientists to trace changes in the genome as the species became distinct. Genes for beak shape (ALX1) and beak size (HMGA2) have been determined to be crucial in separating the hybridized species from local finches. Genes relating to the finches' song may also be involved.

Over the course of 1982–1983, El Niño brought a steady eight months of rain. In a normal rainy season Daphne Major usually gets two months of rain. The excessive rain brought a turnover in the types of vegetation growing on the island. The seeds shifted from large, hard to crack seeds to many different types of small, softer seeds. This gave birds with smaller beaks an advantage when another drought hit the following year. Small-beaked finch could eat all of the small seeds faster than the larger beaked birds could get to them.

In 2003, a drought similar in severity to the 1977 drought occurred on the island. However, in the time between the droughts (beginning in late 1982), the large ground finch (Geospiza magnirostris) had established a breeding population on the island. This species has diet overlap with the medium ground finch (G. fortis), so they are potential competitors. The 2003 drought and resulting decrease in food supply may have increased these species' competition with each other, particularly for the larger seeds in the medium ground finches' diet. Following the drought, the medium ground finch population had a decline in average beak size, in contrast to the increase in size found following the 1977 drought. This was hypothesized to be due to the presence of the large ground finch; the smaller-beaked individuals of the medium ground finch may have been able to survive better due to a lack of competition over large seeds with the large ground finch. This is an example of character displacement.

== Significant findings ==
In Evolution: Making Sense of Life, the takeaway from the Grants' 40-year study can be broken down into three major lessons. The first is that natural selection is a variable, constantly changing process. The fact that they studied the island in both times of excessive rain and drought provides a better picture of what happens to populations over time. The next lesson learned is that evolution can actually be a fairly rapid process. It does not take millions of years; these processes can be seen in as little as two years. Lastly, and as the author states, most importantly, selection can change over time. During some years, selection will favour those birds with larger beaks. Other years with substantial amounts of smaller seeds, selection will favour the birds with the smaller beaks.

In their 2003 paper, the Grants wrap up their decades-long study by stating that selection oscillates in a direction. For this reason, neither the medium ground finch nor the cactus finch has stayed morphologically the same over the course of the experiment. The average beak and body size are not the same today for either species as they were when the study first began. The Grants also state that these changes in morphology and phenotypes could not have been predicted at the beginning. They were able to witness the evolution of the finch species as a result of the inconsistent and harsh environment of Daphne Major directly.

== Awards and recognition ==
=== Peter Grant ===
Awards and recognition include:

Societies and Academies:

- Royal Society of London
- Royal Society of Canada
- American Philosophical Society
- American Academy of Arts and Sciences
- American Society of Naturalists (President – 1999)
- American Academy of Sciences
- Society for the Study of Evolution
- Ecological Society of America
- American Ornithologist's Union
- Linnean Society of London
- Society for Behavioral Ecology
- Charles Darwin Foundation

Honorary Degrees

- Honorary Doctorate Uppsala University, Sweden- 1986
- Universidad San Francisco, Quito- 2005
- University of Zurich- 2008
- University of Toronto- 2017

Associate Editor of Scientific Journals

- Ecology – 1968–1970
- Evolutionary Theory – 1973–
- Biological Journal of the Linnean Society – 1984–
- Philosophical Transactions of the Royal Society of London – 1990–1993

Honorary citizen of Puerto Bacquerizo, I. San Cristobal, Galapagos- 2005–

=== Rosemary Grant ===
Awards and recognition include:

Societies and Academies:

- American Academy of Arts and Sciences
- Charles Darwin Foundation
- American Society of Naturalists
- Royal Society of Canada
- Royal Society of London
- American Philosophical Society

Honorary Degrees:

- McGill University, 2002
- Universidad San Francisco, Quito, 2005
- University of Zurich, 2008
- University of Toronto, 2017

Honorary citizen of Puerto Bacquerizo, I. San Cristobal, Galapagos- 2005–

Since 2010, she has been honoured annually by the Society for the Study of Evolution with the Rosemary Grant Graduate Student Research Award competition, which supports "students in the early stages of their PhD programs by enabling them to collect preliminary data... or to enhance the scope of their research beyond current funding limits".

=== Received jointly ===
- 2017 Royal Medal, Royal Society
- 2009 Kyoto Prize, Inamori Foundation
- 2009 Darwin-Wallace Medal, Linnean Society of London
- 2006 Municipality of Puerto Rico Ayora Science Award
- 2005 Balzan Prize for Population Biology
- 2005 Outstanding Scientists Award, American Institute of Biological Sciences
- 2003 Grinnell Award, University of California at Berkeley
- 2003 Loye and Alden Miller Award, Cooper Ornithological Society
- 2002 Darwin Medal, Royal Society
- 1998 E.O. Wilson Prize, American Society of Naturalists
- 1994 Leidy Medal, Academy of Natural Sciences of Philadelphia

== Books ==
- Grant, B. Rosemary; Grant, Peter R. (1989). Evolutionary Dynamics of a Natural Population: Large Cactus Finch of the Galápagos. Chicago: University of Chicago Press. ISBN 978-0-226-30590-5. OCLC 1149015572 – via Internet Archive.
- Grant, Peter R.; Grant, B. Rosemary (2007). How and Why Species Multiply: The Radiation of Darwin's Finches. Princeton: Princeton University Press. doi:10.1515/9781400837946. ISBN 978-0-691-13360-7. JSTOR j.ctvx5wc23. OCLC 474218839.
- Grant, Peter R.; Grant, B. Rosemary (2014). 40 Years of Evolution: Darwin's Finches on Daphne Major Island. Princeton, NJ: Princeton University Press. ISBN 978-1-4008-5130-0. JSTOR j.ctt5hhncc. OCLC 870597475.
- Grant, Peter R (2023). Enchanted by Daphne: The Life of an Evolutionary Naturalist. Princeton, NJ: Princeton University Press. ISBN 978-0-6912-4624-6
- Grant, B. Rosemary (2024). One Step Sideways, Three Steps Forward: One Woman's Path to Becoming a Biologist. Princeton, New Jersey: Princeton University Press. doi:10.2307/jj.9446867. ISBN 978-0-691-26069-3. JSTOR jj.9446867. OCLC 1437724652.

The Grants were the subject of the Pulitzer Prize for General Nonfiction in 1995:
