= Morton B. Panish =

American physical chemist (born 1929)

Morton Panish
- Born: April 8, 1929 (age 97); Brooklyn, New York
- Citizenship: American
- Education: Michigan State University
- Known for: Semiconductor lasers
- Spouse: Evelyn Wally Chaim (20 August 1951)
- Children: Steven Chaim Panish, Paul William Panish, Deborah Faye Panish
- Awards: C&C Prize, IEEE Morris N. Liebmann Memorial Award; member of the National Academy of Sciences and National Academy of Engineering
- Scientific career
- Fields: Physical chemistry
- Workplaces: Oak Ridge National Laboratory, Avco, Bell Labs
- Thesis: (1954)
- Doctoral advisor: Max Rogers

Morton B. Panish (born April 8, 1929) is an American physical chemist who developed a room-temperature continuous wave semiconductor laser in 1970 with Izuo Hayashi. Panish and Hayashi shared the Kyoto Prize in Advanced Technology for this achievement in 2001.

Panish was elected to the National Academy of Engineering in 1986 and to the National Academy of Sciences in 1987.

== Early life and education ==
Morton Panish was born in Brooklyn on April 8, 1929 to Isidore Panish and Fanny Panish (née Glasser). When Panish was 12, the book Microbe Hunters by Paul de Kruif sparked his interest in science. He graduated from Erasmus Hall High School in 1947, attended Brooklyn College for two years and then transferred to the University of Denver, from which he graduated in 1950. Panish met his future wife, Evelyn Chaim, in Denver. They married during his first year in graduate school.

Panish enrolled in graduate school at Michigan State University, majoring in physical chemistry and minoring in organic chemistry. His master's thesis involved a "series of measurements of the electric dipole behavior of some organic compounds." His advisor Max Rogers, a former student of Linus Pauling, supervised Panish's Ph.D. work on interhalogen compounds.

== Career ==
=== Early career ===
From 1954 to 1957 Panish studied the chemical thermodynamics of molten salts at the Oak Ridge National Laboratory in Tennessee. In 1957, Panish began working for the Research and Advanced Development Division of Avco Corporation in Massachusetts. The primary contract of this division was to develop vehicles for the reentry of thermonuclear weapons into the atmosphere for the United States Air Force. Panish was unwilling to do this work, and instead conducted basic research on chemical thermodynamics of refractory compounds. In 1964, Panish left Avco Corporation because the government terminated the funding for basic research.

In June 1964, Panish began researching III-V semiconductors at Bell Labs in the Solid State Electronics Research Laboratory, a group headed by physicist John Galt.

=== Development of the continuous wave semiconductor laser ===
In 1966, Galt assigned Panish and Izuo Hayashi to investigate a problem involving laser diodes. These early lasers could only run continuously at very low temperatures. At room temperature, they could only operate for a fraction of a second. For the lasers to have practical applications, they would need to operate continuously at room temperature.

A theoretical solution to the problem was proposed by Herbert Kroemer in 1963 &ndash: a double heterojunction laser. However, Kroemer failed to suggest that a suitable combination of III-V semiconductors would be needed to provide interfaces between the III-V compounds. The combination of such materials used for the first CW lasers was GaAs (Gallium Arsenide) and Aluminum Gallium Arsenide, which have the same lattice parameter. The idea was to place a material like GaAs, with a smaller band gap, between two layers of a material such as aluminum gallium arsenide (a solid solution of AlAs and GaAs) that had a larger band gap; this confined the charge carriers and the optical field (the light) to this layer, reducing the current needed for lasing. Panish and Izuo Hayashi independently developed the single heterostructure laser first and then the double heterostructure laser.

In 1970, Zhores Alferov published the announcement of the first room temperature continuously operating double heterostructure laser, one month before Hayashi and Panish published similar results. The two developments were obtained independently. Panish experimented with making wafers using a new form of liquid-phase epitaxy while Hayashi tested the laser properties. Panish and Hayashi observed what they thought might be CW operation in several wafers in the weeks before their final demonstration. That had to await a laser that lived long enough for a complete plot of the lasing spectrum to be achieved. Over the Memorial Day weekend in 1970, while Panish was at home, Hayashi tried a diode and it emitted a continuous-wave beam with just over 24 degrees Celsius and he was able to plot the complete spectrum with the very slow equipment available at the time.

Room-temperature lasers were soon duplicated at RCA Laboratories, Standard Telecommunication Laboratories and Nippon Electric Corporation (NEC). Over the next few years, the lasers became longer-lasting and more reliable. At Bell Labs, the job of creating a practical device was given to Barney DeLoach. But in January 1973, they told him to cease this work. As he recalled, their view was, "We've already got air, we've already got copper. Who needs a new medium?"

The continuous wave semiconductor laser led to the light sources in fiber-optic communication, laser printers, barcode readers and optical disc drives, but it was mostly Japanese entrepreneurs, not AT&T, that ended up profiting from these technologies. The Japanese success was enhanced by Panish's ex-partner Izuo Hayashi, who had returned to Japan.

After the work on double heterostructure lasers, Panish continued to demonstrate variants of laser structures with other collaborators through the late 1970s, but the major focus of his work for the remainder of his career was to exploit the new opportunities presented by the use of Molecular Beam Epitaxy to produce lattice matched semiconductor heterostructures in III-V systems other than GaAs-AlGaAs for other devices (detectors, quantum well physics and devices, ultra fast hererostructure transistors) and for the study of the physics of small layered structures. He worked on this issue until 1992.

== Awards and honors ==
- 1979 Electronics Division Award of the Electrochemical Society
- 1986 Solid State Medalist of the Electrochemical Society
- 1987 C & C Prize (Japan)
- 1990 International Crystal Growth Award
- 1991 Morris N. Liebmann Memorial Award of the IEEE
- 1994 John Bardeen Award of the Metallurgical Society
- 2001 Kyoto Prize in Advanced Technology

== Works ==
The following are some of the major works by Panish:

- Hayashi, I.; Panish, M.; Foy, P. (April 1969). "A low-threshold room-temperature injection laser". IEEE Journal of Quantum Electronics. 5 (4): 211–212. Bibcode:1969IJQE....5..211H. doi:10.1109/JQE.1969.1075759.
- Panish, M. B. (1970). "Double heterostructure injection lasers with room-Temperature thresholds as low as 2300 A/cm²". Applied Physics Letters. 16 (8): 326–327. Bibcode:1970ApPhL..16..326P. doi:10.1063/1.1653213.
- Hayashi, I.; Panish, M.; Foy, P. (1970). "Junction lasers which operate continuously at room temperature". Applied Physics Letters. 17 (3): 109. Bibcode:1970ApPhL..17..109H. doi:10.1063/1.1653326.
- Hayashi, I.; Panish, M.; Reinhart, F. K. (1971). "GaAs AlxGa1−xAs Double Heterostructure Injection Lasers". Journal of Applied Physics. 42 (5): 1929. Bibcode:1971JAP....42.1929H. doi:10.1063/1.1660469.
