= Kyoto Prize in Arts and Philosophy =

Prize for lifetime achievements in the arts and philosophy

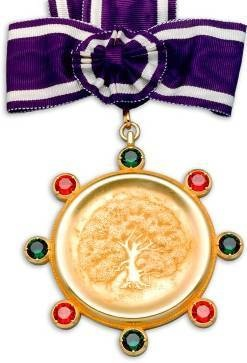
- Awarded for: Global achievement in Arts and Philosophy
- Location: Kyoto, Japan
- Presented by: Inamori Foundation
- First award: 1985
- Website: kyotoprize.org

The Kyoto Prize in Arts and Philosophy is awarded once a year by the Inamori Foundation for lifetime achievements in the arts and philosophy. The Prize is one of three Kyoto Prize categories; the others are the Kyoto Prize in Advanced Technology and the Kyoto Prize in Basic Sciences. The first Kyoto Prize in Arts and Philosophy was awarded to Olivier Messiaen in 1985, the "greatest composer to have emerged from 20th century France". The Prize is widely regarded as the most prestigious award available in fields not traditionally honored with a Nobel Prize.

== Prizes ==
A Kyoto laureate is awarded a gold medal, a diploma, and a prize money of 100 million yen (US$913,100 or €825,800 as of January 2020), making it one of the richest literary prizes in the world.

== Kyoto laureates in Arts and Philosophy ==
The Kyoto Prize is awarded annually in three categories: Advanced Technology, Basic Sciences, and Arts and Philosophy. The category Arts and Philosophy consists of four fields which are awarded in alternating cycles: Music, Arts, Theater and Cinema, and Thought and Ethics.

== Laureates ==
Source: Kyoto Prize

=== Music ===
Year	Laureate	Country		
1985	Olivier Messiaen	France	1908–1992	A Composer Who Left a Significant Mark on the 20th Century Music with His Original Theoretical Framework Fundamentally Dependent upon Catholicism
1989	John Cage	United States	1912–1992	A Composer Who Established a New Style of Contemporary Music by His New Concept of "Chance Music" and Non-Western Musical Thought
1993	Witold Lutosławski	Poland	1913–1994	A Composer Who Opened New Possibilities of a Contemporary Musical Expression of Atonality and Aleatory Influenced by East European Folk Music
1997	Iannis Xenakis	Greece	1922–2001	A Composer Who Created a Totally New Music Using Computer-Aided Approach by Viewing Music Statistically as a Set of "Sound Elements"
2001	György Ligeti	Austria	1923–2006	A Composer with Superb Originality and Firm Commitment to Innovation who Continues to Present New Challenges
2005	Nikolaus Harnoncourt	Austria	1929–2016	A musician of exceptional creativity who has contributed to the establishment of the historically informed performance of European early music, and who has extended his principles and interpretation to modern music
2009	Pierre Boulez	France	1925–2016	A Musician Who Has Consistently Set Trends through His Composition, Conducting, Writing, and Organizational Operation
2013	Cecil Taylor	United States	1929–2018	An Innovative Jazz Musician Who Has Fully Explored the Possibilities of Piano Improvisation
2017	Richard Taruskin	United States	1947–2022	A Musicologist and Critic of Prodigious Erudition Who Has Transformed Contemporary Perspectives on Music through Historical Research and Essays That Defy Conventional Critical Paradigms
2022	Zakir Hussain	India	1951–2024	A Highly Innovative and Creative Artist who Opened up the New Musical Possibilities of the Tabla, a Traditional Indian Percussion Instrument
2026	Laurie Anderson	United States	1947	An Artist Who Has Established a Unique Form of Multimedia Performance by Deploying Electronic Media to Fuse Experimental and Pop Sounds with Her Voice and Body.

=== Arts ===
Year	Laureate	Country		
1986	Isamu Noguchi	United States	1904–1988	An Artist Who Fused Eastern and Western Tradition not only in Sculpture but also in Broad Areas of Physical Design
1990	Renzo Piano	Italy	born 1937	An Architect Who Elicited a New Potentiality for Architecture by Lifting Technology to the Realm of Fine Art
1995	Roy Lichtenstein	United States	1923–1997	A Painter Whose Pop-Art Motifs Continuously Challenged Established Concepts of Art Its Role in Modern Society
1998	Nam June Paik	United States	1932–2006	An Artist Who Launched the Field of "Media Art" With His Inventive Use of Image Media in Modern Art
2002	Tadao Ando	Japan	born 1941	An architect who explored the limits of humankind's relationship with nature through his original forms and structures
2006	Issey Miyake	Japan	1938–2022	A designer who has made great contribution to the innovative development of clothing by fusing Eastern and Western cultures and applying cutting edge technology
2010	William Kentridge	South Africa	born 1955	An Artist Who Has Created an Original Art by Fusing Traditional Drawings with Animation and Other Media
2014	Fukumi Shimura	Japan	born 1924	An Artist in Constant Pursuit of the Fundamental Human Value of Harmonious Coexistence with Nature through the Artistic Creation of Tsumugi Kimono on the Basis of Folk Wisdom
2018	Joan Jonas	United States	born 1936	An Artist Who Pioneered New Artistic Expression by Integrating Performance Art and New Media, Remaining at the Forefront of Contemporary Art for 50 Years
2023	Nalini Malani	India	born 1946	An Artist from the Non-Western World Who Has Faced the Predicaments of the Oppressed, Pioneered Artistic Expression Representing the Voice of the Voiceless, and Contributed to the “Decentralization” of Art

=== Theater, cinema ===
Year	Laureate	Country		
1987	Andrzej Wajda	Poland	1926–2016	A Film Director Who Kept a Firm Eye on the Tumultuous Era of Poland in the 20th Century and Has Depicted Liberty, Courage and Dignity of Human Beings
1991	Peter Stephen Paul Brook	United Kingdom	1925–2022	A Stage Director, Who Has Inspired New Anima to Classic Repertories through His Innovative Rendering Which Amalgamates Essential Expressions of West and East Theatre Traditions
1994	Akira Kurosawa	Japan	1910–1998	A Film Director Who Has Pursued the Humanity with an Acute Insight and Highly Original Images
1999	Maurice Béjart	France	1927–2007	A Choreographer Who Has Contributed the Dance to Regain Its Status as Fine Art through His Major Performances such as the "Sacre du Printemps" and the "Bolero"
2003	Tamao Yoshida	Japan	1919–2006	The Foremost Master Puppeteer in Bunraku, a Major Classical Performance Art of Japan
2007	Pina Bausch	Germany	1940–2009	A choreographer who has broken down the boundaries between dance and theater and pioneered a new direction for theatrical art
2011	Tamasaburo Bando V	Japan	born 1950	A Creator of Elegant Beauty Whose Artistry with Kabuki at Its Core Crosses Many Genres of Performing Arts
2015	John Neumeier	United States	born 1942	A Choreographer Who Developed 20th Century Ballet to New Levels, and Continues to Lead the Global Dance Scene Today
2019	Ariane Mnouchkine	France	born 1939	A Stage Director Who Has Innovated Theatrical Expressions Through Her Original Masterpieces for Over Half a Century.
2024	William Forsythe	United States	born 1949	The Choreographer Who Opened a New Horizon of Performing Arts by Radically Renewing Methodologies and Aesthetics of Ballet and Dance

=== Thought and ethics ===
Year	Laureate	Country		
1988	Paul Thieme	West Germany	1905–2001	One of the Most Eminent Indologists of the 20th Century Who Made a Significant Contribution to the Comprehension of Indo-Aryan and the Ancient Indian Philosophy through His Detailed Studies of Vedic
1992	Karl Raimund Popper	United Kingdom	1902–1994	A Philosopher Who Gave a Great Impact on the Intellectual World of Natural and Social Science by What He Calls Falsifiability Criterion and Advocated the Realization of Open Society Based on the "Critical Rationalism"
1996	Willard Van Orman Quine	United States	1908–2000	A Philosopher Who Made Significant Contribution to the Development of Contemporary Philosophy by Rejecting the Method of Analytic-Synthetic Distinction and Naturalizing Epistemology Based on a Holistic and Systematic Linguistic Framework
2000	Paul Ricœur	France	1913–2005	An Imposing Construct of Hermeneutic Phenomenology that Embraces a New Concept of Ethics
2004	Jürgen Habermas	Germany	1929–2026	Achievements in social philosophy, in particular establishment of the communicative action theory and discourse ethics, and its application in practical activities for a public-minded ideal society
2008	Charles Margrave Taylor	Canada	born 1931	Construction of a Social Philosophy to Pursue the Coexistence of Diverse Cultures
2012	Gayatri Chakravorty Spivak	India	born 1942	A Critical Theorist and Educator Speaking for the Humanities Against Intellectual Colonialism in Relation to the Globalized World
2016	Martha Craven Nussbaum	United States	born 1947	A Philosopher Who Has Developed a New Theory of Justice Advocating the Capabilities Approach
2021	Bruno Latour	France	1947–2022	Radically Re-examining “Modernity” by Developing a Philosophy that Focuses on Interactions Between Technoscience and Social Structure
2025	Carol Gilligan	United States	born 1936	Pioneering a New Horizon for the “Ethic of Care” While Pointing Out the Distortions and Limitations of Conventional Psychological Theories by Analyzing Women’s Thoughts and Behaviors.

== See also ==
- Kyoto Prize
- Kyoto Prize in Advanced Technology
- Kyoto Prize in Basic Sciences
- List of Kyoto Prize winners
