= List of fellows of the Royal Society elected in 2004 =

This is a list of people elected Fellow of the Royal Society in 2004.

== Fellows ==
- Samson Abramsky
- Spencer Charles Hilton Barrett
- Julian Besag
- Timothy Robert Birkhead
- Martin Bobrow
- Donal Donat Conor Bradley
- Malcolm Watson Brown
- Charles Richard Arthur Catlow
- Graeme Milbourne Clark
- Gordon Richard Conway
- Lennox Cowie
- Anthony George Cullis
- Partha Sarathi Dasgupta
- Nicholas Edward Day
- Caroline Dean
- Graham John Dockray
- Richard Michael Durbin
- David Bernard Alper Epstein
- Gerard Ian Evan
- Bland James Finlay
- Norman Andrew Fleck
- Carlos Silvestre Frenk
- Vernon Charles Gibson
- Lynn Faith Gladden
- Bryan Thomas Grenfell
- Stephen Edgar Halford
- Andrew David Hamilton
- Edward Hinds
- David William Holden
- David Thomas Kemp
- Malcolm Sim Longair
- Alan Douglas Martin
- John Francis Brake Mitchell
- William Branks Motherwell
- David Preiss
- John Adrian Pyle
- Carol Vivien Robinson
- Nancy Jane Rothwell
- Frank Sherwood Rowland
- David Henry Solomon
- Peter Henry St George Hyslop
- Christopher Brian Stringer
- David Tollervey
- Nicholas John Wald
- Dale Brian Wigley

== Foreign members ==
- Karl Frank Austen
- Peter Martin Goldreich
- Jane Lubchenco
- Elliot Martin Meyerowitz
- Michele Parrinello
