= Morris Cohen (American metallurgist) =

American metallurgist and academic (1911–2005)

Morris Cohen (November 27, 1911 – May 27, 2005), born in Chelsea, Massachusetts, United States, was an American metallurgist, who spent his entire career affiliated with the Massachusetts Institute of Technology. He graduated from his undergraduate degree in 1933, receiving his doctorate three years later, and was appointed assistant professor of metallurgy in 1937. He was appointed Professor of Physical Metallurgy in 1946, and an Institute Professor in 1975. He took emeritus status in 1982.

He worked on the Manhattan Project during the Second World War. He and his colleagues developed fuel rods for Enrico Fermi's nuclear reactor at the University of Chicago.

He has been awarded the gold medal by the ASM International (formerly American Society for Metals) (1968) and the Japan Institute of Metals (1970), the National Medal of Science in 1976, and the Kyoto Prize in 1987.
