= Bryan Grenfell =

British biologist (born 1954)

Bryan Grenfell OBE FRS
- Born: Bryan Thomas Grenfell; 7 December 1954 (age 71)
- Education: Imperial College London (BSc); University of York (DPhil)
- Scientific career
- Fields: Epidemiology
- Workplaces: Princeton University; Pennsylvania State University; University of Cambridge; University of Sheffield
- Thesis: Population dynamics of baleen whales and krill in the Southern Ocean (1981)
- Website: eeb.princeton.edu/people/bryan-grenfell

Bryan Thomas Grenfell (born 1954) is a British population biologist and the Kathryn Briger and Sarah Fenton Professor of Ecology and Evolutionary Biology and Public Affairs at the Princeton School of Public and International Affairs at Princeton University.

== Education ==
Grenfell earned a Bachelor of Science degree with honours from Imperial College London, and DPhil in biology from the University of York in 1981.

== Career and research ==
After his DPhil, Grenfell spent a post-doctoral period at Imperial College London, with Roy Anderson, before joining the faculty at the University of Sheffield. He moved to the University of Cambridge in 1990, to the Pennsylvania State University in 2004, and then to Princeton University in 2009. He has served as a member of the Board of Governors of the Wellcome Trust (2014–2021).

Grenfell's research focuses on the (often non-linear) dynamics and control of infectious diseases in humans and animals. He has used simple epidemiological models and time series analysis to interpret large spatio-temporal datasets, elucidating the spread through time and space of acute infectious pathogens, notably measles.

In 2004, Grenfell and colleagues coined the term phylodynamics to describe the interaction between pathogen evolutionary dynamics and the dynamics of epidemics. This concept has been widely applied since, for example, in discussing how pathogens evolve in response to host immunity.

Grenfell and collaborators were extensively involved in analyzing the dynamics of the Severe Acute Respiratory Syndrome Coronavirus 2 pandemic that began in 2020. In particular, they have focused on the impact of immune life history on the future dynamics of the pandemic and the performance of vaccination strategies.

=== Awards and honours ===
In 1991 Grenfell was awarded a T.H. Huxley Medal from Imperial College London, and in 1995 the Scientific Medal of the Zoological Society of London. He was awarded the Order of the British Empire in 2002. He was elected a Fellow of the Royal Society (FRS) in 2004. He has been a member of the American Academy of Arts and Sciences since 2006, and a Fellow of the American Association for the Advancement of Science since 2011. In 2008, he was awarded an Honorary Doctorate by the University of Sheffield. In 2022 he received the Kyoto Prize in Basic Sciences.
