= Paul Thieme =

German Indologist (1905–2001)

- Born: 18 March 1905; Berlin, German Empire
- Died: 24 April 2001 (aged 96); London, England
- Awards: Kyoto Prize in Arts and Philosophy (1988)

Education
- Education: University of Göttingen

Philosophical work
- Era: Contemporary philosophy
- Region: Western philosophy
- School: History of philosophy
- Main interests: Indian philosophy Comparative linguistics

Paul Thieme (German: [paʊl ˈtiːmə]; 18 March 1905 – 24 April 2001) was a German Indologist and scholar of Vedic Sanskrit. In 1988 he was awarded the Kyoto Prize in Arts and Philosophy for "he added immensely to our knowledge of Vedic and other classical Indian literature and provided a solid foundation to the study of the history of Indian thought".

== Selected bibliography ==
- 1929: Das Plusquamperfektum im Veda (Diss. Göttingen 1928).
- 1935: Panini and the Veda. Studies in the Early History of Linguistic Science in India. Allahabad
- 1938: Der Fremdling im Rigveda. Eine Studie über die Bedeutung der Worte ari, arya, aryaman und aarya, Leipzig.
