= Nalini Malani =

Indian artist (born 1946)

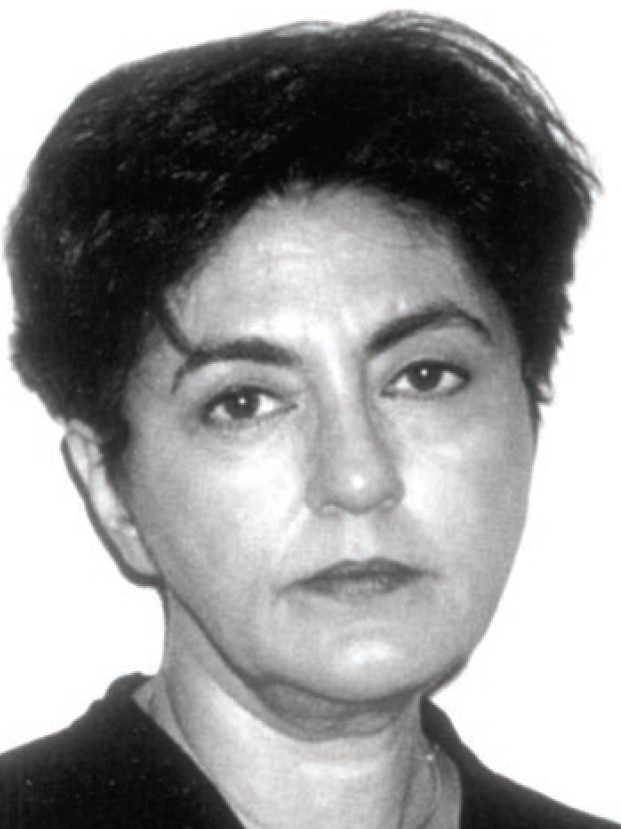
- Born: 19 February 1946 (age 80); Karachi, British India
- Education: Sir J. J. School of Art, Bombay
- Notable work: Dream Houses; Can You Hear Me?
- Spouse: Johan Pijnappel
- Children: Aparna Kapadia; Payal Kapadia
- Awards: Fukuoka Arts and Culture Prize (2013); Joan Miró Prize (2019); Kyoto Prize in Arts and Philosophy (2023)
- Website: nalinimalani.com

Nalini Malani (born 19 February 1946) is an Indian artist, among the country's first generation of video artists.

She works across several mediums including theatre, videos, installations and mixed-media paintings and drawings. Her work is informed by her experience of migration in the aftermath of the partition of India, as well as feminist issues.

Malani made her first video work 'Dream Houses' (1969), as the youngest and only female participant of the Vision Exchange Workshop (VIEW), an experimental multi-disciplinary artist workshop in Bombay (Mumbai) by late artist Akbar Padamsee. Since then, works have been shown at various museums, including the Stedelijk Museum Amsterdam, the National Gallery in London, and the Museum of Modern Art in New York.

== Early life and education ==
Malani was born in Karachi (Sindh) in what was then British India, now Pakistan, in 1946, the only child of Satni Advani (Sindhi Sikh) and Jairam Malani (Theosophist).

Malani's family sought refuge in India during the partition. They relocated to Kolkata (then Calcutta), where her father worked with Tata Airlines (later Air India) and relocated to Mumbai in 1954, where they lived in a colony built for displaced Sindhis. Her family's experience of leaving behind their homeland and becoming refugees inspired Malani's artwork.

Malani studied Fine Arts in Mumbai and obtained a Diploma in Fine Arts from Sir Jamsetjee Jeejebhoy School of Art in 1969.

From 1964-67, Malani had a studio at the Bhulabhai Desai Memorial Institute at Breach Candy, Mumbai where artists, musicians, dancers and theatre makers worked individually and collectively. There she met and collaborated with artists from allied forms of artistic practice like theatre.

From 1970-72, Malani received a scholarship from the French Government to study fine arts in Paris. Whilst there, she worked with illegal immigrants and also distributed the political newspaper La Cause du Peuple.

== Career ==
After studying in Paris, Malani returned to India. She spent a few years working with photography and film.

In her early career, Malani mostly focused on painting – acrylic on canvas & watercolour on paper. She explored techniques such as the reverse painting method (taught to her in the late-80s by Bhupen Khakhar), which she would recurrently use in her future work. The themes she explored during this period dealt with the turbulent time that India was experiencing politically and socially, as well as the deepening literacy of moving image of its population. She produced a socially based portrayal of contemporary India.

Malani was disappointed with the lack of acknowledgement that women artists had to face in India and resolved to bring them together for a group show, to promote the sense of solidarity. In 1985, she curated the first exhibition of Indian female artists, in Delhi. This led to a series of traveling exhibitions that were taken to public spaces as an attempt to go beyond the elitist atmosphere of the art gallery.

Malani was a recipient of two scholarships from the Government of India, as well as a grant in 1989 for travel and work in the United States.

The sectarian violence that hit India in the early 1990s after the demolition of the Babri Masjid triggered a sudden shift in her artwork. The renewed religious conflict that had proven to be recurring (bringing back memories of the Partition) pushed her artistic endeavours. Her earlier foray into performance art and her interest in literature brought new sides to her art. She is counted amongst the earliest to transition from traditional painting to new media work. Working with actors and theatre directors in the 1990s led her to explore video, as well as shadow plays and performative wall drawings. Malani describes the influence of theatre on her work: "Theatre gave me the experience of memory, because in theatre, you can't go back: you take away the memory of the performance."

In 2013, Malani became the first Asian woman to receive the Arts & Culture Fukuoka Prize for her "consistent focus on such daring contemporary and universal themes as religious conflict, war, oppression of women and environmental destruction."

In 2016, Malani started using an iPad and digital pencil in her work.

== Notable works ==
Malani uses a visual language that moves from stop motion, erasure animations, reverse paintings and to digital animations, where she draws directly with her finger onto a tablet.

For two-dimensional works, she uses both oil paintings and watercolors. Her other inspirations are from the realm of memory, myth and desire. The rapid brush style evokes dreams and fantasies. Malani's video and installation work allowed her to shift from strictly real space to a combination of real space and virtual space, moving away from strictly object-based work. Her video work often references divisions, gender, and cyborgs. Malani roots her identity as female and as Indian, and her work might be understood as a way for her identity to confront the rest of the world. She often references Greek and Hindu mythology. The characters of 'destroyed women' like Medea, Cassandra and Sita feature often in her narrative. Her work can be broadly classified under two categories; experiments with visual media and the moving image like Utopia (1969-1976), Mother India (2005), In Search of Vanished Blood (2012); ephemeral and in-situ works such as City of Desires (1992), Medea as Mutant (1993/2014), The Tables have turned (2008). Though her work talks of violence and conflict, her main intent is collective catharsis.

=== Dream Houses (1969) ===
Malani's first experimental film made at the Vision Exchange Workshop (VIEW) — the brainchild of late artist Akbar Padamsee — drew inspiration from utopian modern Indian architecture. Made using photographic equipment available at the Workshop, it features use of a cardboard maquette, different light sources, primary colour filters, and a Mamiyaflex camera. For this, Malani drew on the 'ideological possibilities of modern architecture', looking to the work of renowned architects Charles Correa and Buckminster Fuller, and blending in learnings from Johannes Itten's colour theories along with Moholy-Nagy’s Vision in Motion.

"The subject of Dream Houses is the idealism and hope that modernism brought during the Nehruvian period, in which poverty and housing problems in modern India could be solved through a master plan for urban space." — Nalini Malani

'Dream Houses' was shown at the Kiran Nadar Museum of Art (KNMA) (2014), the Goethe Institute, Mumbai, (2019) and the MoMa, New York,(2022), after being 'lost' for 50 years.

=== Unity in Diversity (2003) ===
Malani's 2003 video play, Unity in Diversity, is based on the 19th century Indian painter Raja Ravi Varma's Galaxy of Musicians, with the overt theme of nationalistic unity displayed through the garb of eleven musicians from different parts of India, seemingly playing in harmony. Malani makes a statement on this idealized version of unity by incorporating later histories of violence into that image.

=== Mother India (2005) ===
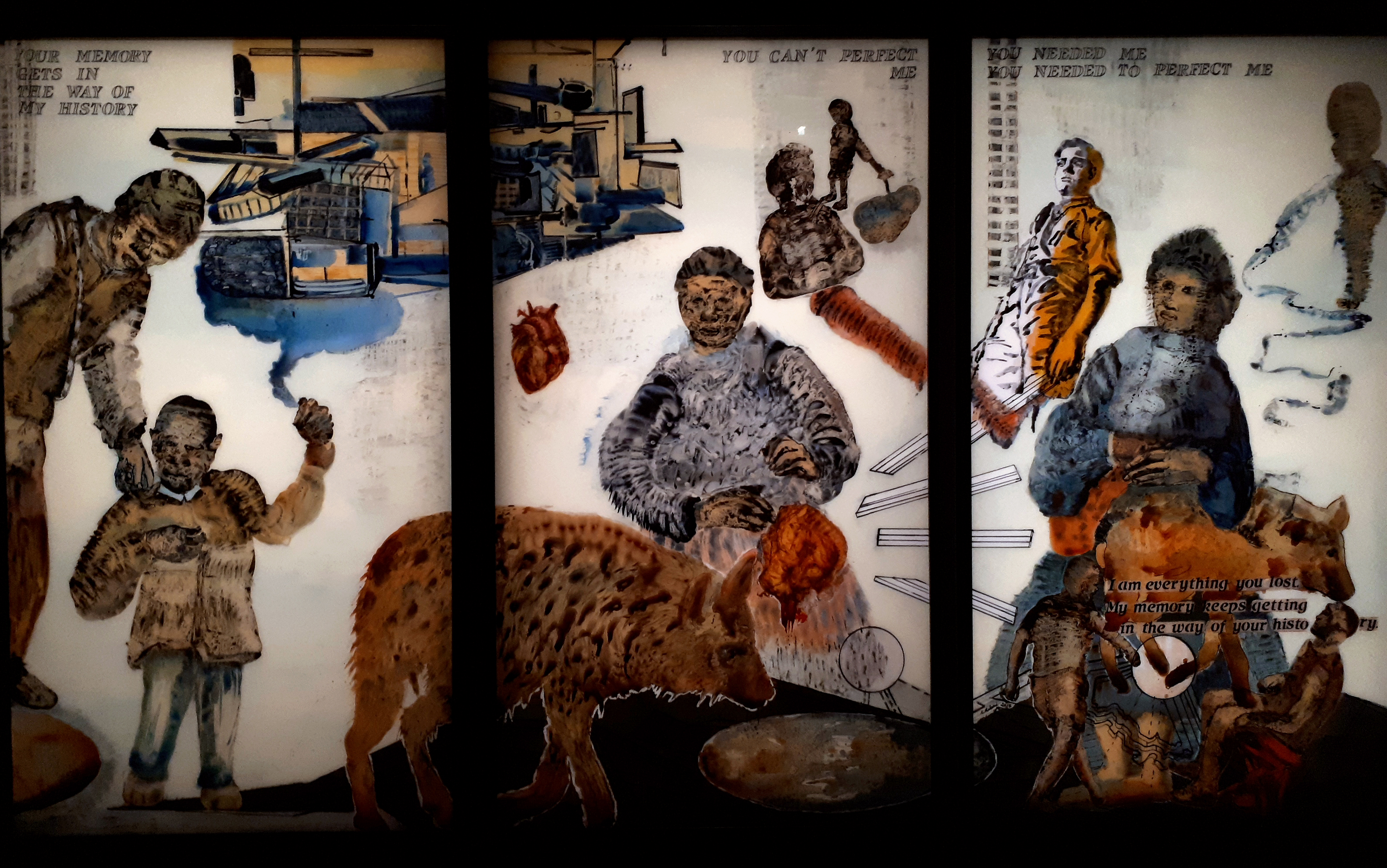
Nalini Malani, The Rebellion of the Dead, 2017

The video installation was inspired by an essay by the sociologist Veena Das titled "Language and Body: Transactions in the Construction of Pain". It is a synchronised five screen wall-to-wall projection combining archival footage with poetic and painterly images to tell the story of how Indian Nationalism was built using the bodies of women as metaphors for the nation. The work speaks of women as "mutant, de-gendered and violated beyond imagination." The Partition of India and the 2002 Gujarat riots are the central events referenced in this installation, as there was a sharp increase in violence against women in these periods.

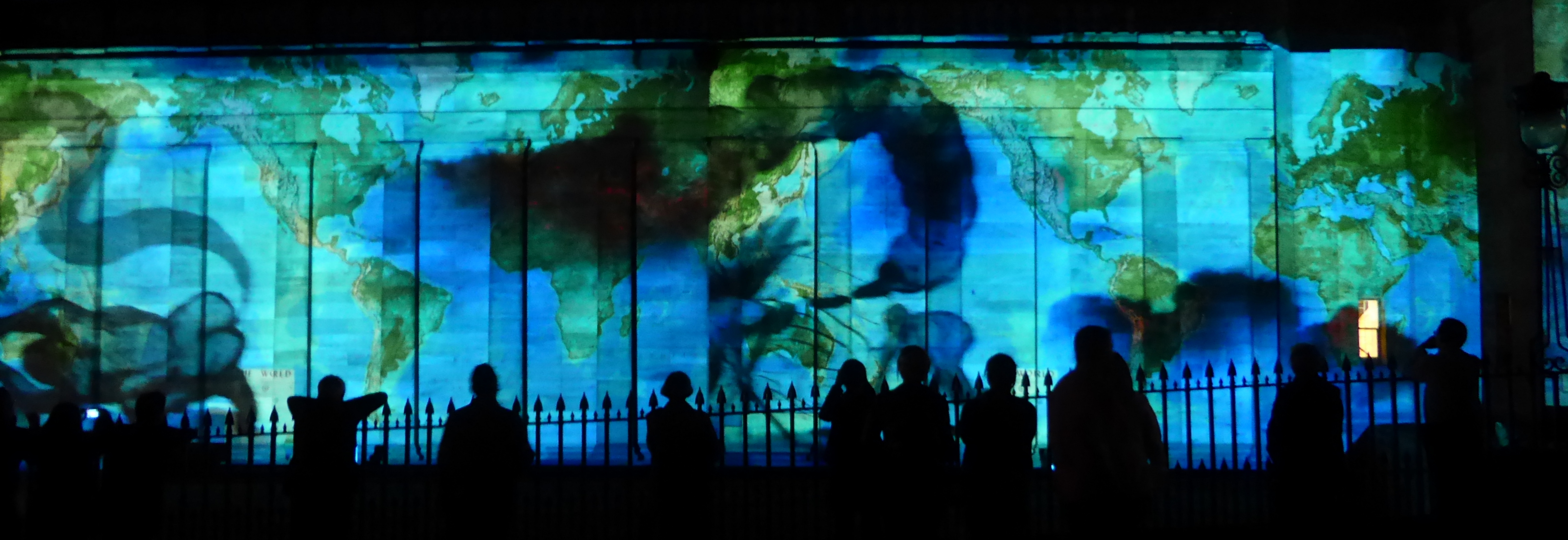
Malani's installation In Search of Vanished Blood at the Edinburgh Art Festival in 2014

=== In Search of Vanished Blood (2012) ===
This installation, which was first produced for the 13th edition of Documenta, consists of five larger rotating Mylar cylinders (metaphorically referring to Buddhist prayer wheels) reverse-painted with images of soldiers, animals, gods and guns. The shadow play caused by this rotation tells the story of bloodshed, especially narrating the story of India since the partition and highlighting the plight of the dispossessed/tribal communities whose lives have been affected by development decisions made by the government.

=== Through the Looking Glass ===
Between 1987 and 1989, Malani organised 'Through The Looking Glass' with her contemporaries, the women artists Madhvi Parekh, Nilima Sheikh, and Arpita Singh. The exhibition, featuring works by all four artists, travelled to five non-commercial venues across India. Inspired by a meeting in 1979 with Nancy Spero, May Stevens and Ana Mendieta at the AIR Gallery in New York (the first all-female artists’ cooperative gallery in the US), Malani had planned to organise an exhibition entirely of works by women artists, which failed to materialise due to lack of interest and support.

== Awards and recognition ==
=== Awards ===
- 1970-72: French Government Scholarship for Fine Arts Study in Paris
- 2010: Honorary Doctorate in Fine Arts, San Francisco Art Institute, USA
- 2013: Fukuoka Arts and Culture Prize for Contemporary Art, Fukuoka, Japan
- 2014: St. Moritz Art Masters Lifetime Achievement Award, St. Moritz, Switzerland
- 2016: Asia Arts Game Changer, Asia Society, Hong Kong
- 2019: Joan Miró Prize, Fundació Joan Miró, Barcelona, Spain
- 2023: Kyoto Prize in Arts and Philosophy

=== Fellowships ===
- 1984-89: Art Research Fellowship, Government of India
- 1989: USIA Fellowship, Fine Arts Work Center, Provincetown, Massachusetts, USA
- 2020: Contemporary Fellowship, National Gallery, London, UK

=== Residencies ===
- 1988: Kasauli Art Centre, Kasauli, India
- 1999: Lasalle-SIA, Singapore
- 1999-2000: Fukuoka Asian Art Museum, Fukuoka, Japan
- 2003: Civitella Ranieri, Umbertide, Italy
- 2005: Lucas Art Residencies, Montalvo, California, USA

=== Collections ===
- Art Gallery of Western Australia, Perth, Australia
- Dr. Bhau Daji Lad Museum, Mumbai
- Jehangir Nicholson Art Foundation (JNAF), Mumbai
- Lalit Kala Akademi, New Delhi
- National Gallery of Modern Art (NGMA), New Delhi
- MoMa The Museum of Modern Art, New York
- Queensland Art Gallery | Gallery of Modern Art, Brisbane, Australia
- Tata Institute of Fundamental Research (TIFR), Mumbai
- Tate, Britain

== Exhibitions ==
=== Solo ===
Year	Title	Institution	Location	Notes	Ref
		ICA	Boston		
		Stedelijk Museum	Amsterdam		
		Centre Pompidou	Paris		
		Castello di Rivoli	Turin		
		Fundació Joan Miró	Barcelona		
2020 - 2021	Can You Hear Me?	Whitechapel Gallery	London		
2022		Holburne Museum	Bath	Work from the National Gallery Contemporary Fellowship	
2023		National Gallery	London	Work from the National Gallery Contemporary Fellowship	

=== Group ===
Year	Title	Institution	Location	Notes	Ref
