= Tamao Yoshida =

Japanese puppeteer

Tamao Yoshida (吉田 玉男; January 7, 1919 in Osaka, Japan – September 24, 2006) was a Japanese puppeteer. He is a 2003 recipient of the Kyoto Prize in Arts and Philosophy.
