= Alan Martin (physicist) =

British physicist (born 1937)

- Born: 4 December 1937 (age 88)
- Education: University College London BSc, PhD
- Awards: Fellow of the Royal Society (2004); Max Born Medal and Prize (2007)
- Scientific career
- Fields: elementary particle physics; particle physics phenomenology
- Doctoral students: Nigel Glover; Graham Ross

Alan Douglas Martin FRS (born 4 December 1937) is a British physicist, currently Emeritus Professor of Physics at the University of Durham.

== Education ==
Martin was educated at the Eltham College. He received his BSc (1958) and PhD (1962) degrees from the University College London.

== Work ==
Martin is known for his research in the theory of elementary particles, which includes studies of mesic atoms, kaon physics, pi–pi scattering, hadron spectroscopy and the anomalous magnetic moment of the muon. His work on the W boson and top quark was used in early collider experiments.

His ongoing projects include the determination of the parton distributions of the proton and studies in small x and diffractive physics, which are relevant to the experiments at the Large Hadron Collider.

He is an author of well-known textbooks on particle physics. Quarks and Leptons, co-authored with Francis Halzen in 1984, is a standard text around the world.

== Awards and honours ==
Martin was elected a Fellow of the Royal Society (FRS) in 2004. He was awarded the 2007 Max Born Medal and Prize for his pioneering research in the understanding of the strong interaction, in particular his theoretical work on the internal structure of the proton.
