= George Gray (chemist) =

British organic chemist

- Born: George William Gray; 4 September 1926
- Died: 12 May 2013 (aged 86)
- Occupation: Professor of Organic Chemistry
- Spouse: Marjorie Canavan (m. 1953–2013)

George William Gray CBE FRS (4 September 1926 – 12 May 2013) was a Professor of Organic Chemistry at the University of Hull who was instrumental in developing the long-lasting materials which made liquid crystal displays possible. He created and systematically developed liquid crystal materials science, and established a method of practical molecular design. Gray was recipient of the 1995 Kyoto Prize in Advanced Technology.

== Education and career ==
Born in Denny, Scotland, Gray was educated at the University of Glasgow and while working as an assistant lecturer at the University College in Hull (then part of the University of London) obtained his PhD in 1953.

He developed his academic career at the college, which became the University of Hull in 1954, from 1946 to 1990. He was appointed senior lecturer in 1960, Professor of Organic Chemistry in 1974, and GF Grant Professor of Chemistry in 1984. He remained an Emeritus Professor at Hull.

In 1990 he joined the chemical company Merck, then became an independent consultant in 1996.

== Liquid crystals ==
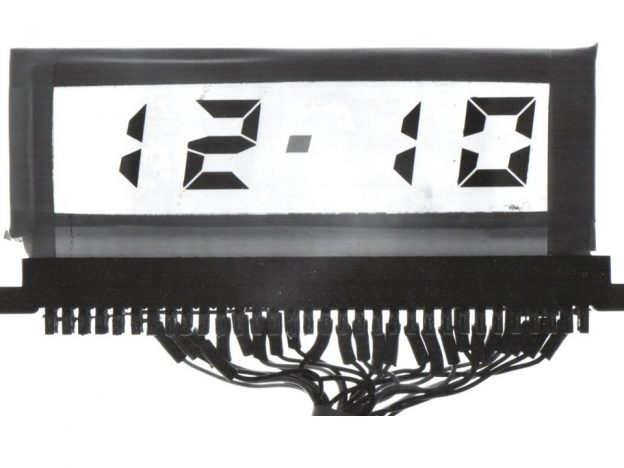
Demonstration digital clock using cyanobiphenyl liquid crystals made at the Royal Radar Establishment in 1973

In 1973, in conjunction with the Royal Radar Establishment, Gray showed that 4-Cyano-4'-pentylbiphenyl possessed a stable nematic phase at room temperature. This compound and other long-lasting cyano-biphenyls made the twisted nematic display (LCD) popular. Gray wrote the first English book on liquid crystals, "Molecular Structure and Properties of Liquid Crystals", published in 1962.

Gray was recipient of the 1995 Kyoto Prize in Advanced Technology and was made a Commander of the Order of the British Empire (CBE) in 1991. He was elected a Fellow of the Royal Society in 1983, and in 1987 was awarded the Leverhulme Medal of the Royal Society. In 1979 he was awarded the Rank Prize for Opto-electronics and in 1996 the SID Karl Ferdinand Braun Prize. The University of Hull was the first university to be awarded the Queen's Award for Technological Achievement, in 1979, for the liquid crystal joint-development work. Gray has been a Director of the International Liquid Crystal Society. Members of the British Liquid Crystal Society honoured his achievements by establishing the George W. Gray Medal for contributions to liquid crystal research and technology.

In March 2013, the University of Hull celebrated the 40th anniversary of Gray's seminal paper being published on 22 March 1973.

Hull Trains named their first British Rail Class 222 'Pioneer' high-speed train Professor George Gray in recognition of his achievements in the modern history of Hull.

== Personal life ==
In 1953 George Gray married Marjorie Canavan, who died two weeks before her husband. In later life they lived in Furzehill in Wimborne Minster, Dorset. They had three daughters.
