= Graham Farquhar =

Australian biophysicist (born 1947)

Graham Farguhar AO, FAA, FRS
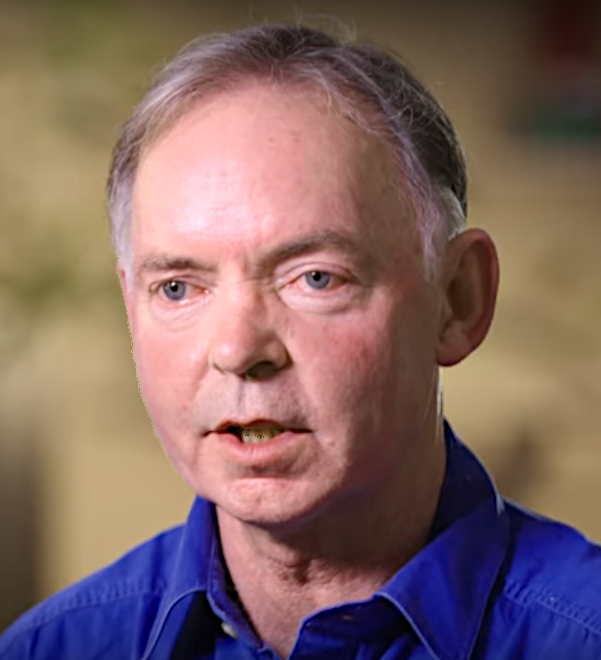
- Born: Graham Douglas Farquhar; 8 December 1947 (age 78); Hobart, Tasmania, Australia.
- Education: Wesley College; Australian National University (BSc, PhD); University of Queensland (BSc)
- Occupations: Biophysicist; Professor; Researcher
- Employer: Australian National University
- Known for: Plant biophysics research
- Title: Senior Australian of the Year (2018)
- Awards: Rank Prize in Nutrition (2014); Prime Minister's Prize for Science (2015); Macfarlane Burnet Medal and Lecture (2016); Kyoto Prize in Basic Sciences (2017); Royal Medal (2025)

Graham Douglas Farquhar, AO, FAA, FRS (born 8 December 1947) is an Australian biophysicist, Distinguished Professor at Australian National University, and leader of the Farquhar Lab. In 2018 Farquhar was named Senior Australian of the Year.

== Life ==
Farquhar attended Wesley College, finishing in 1964, and went on to earn a BSc from Australian National University in 1968, a BSc with Honours in Biophysics from University of Queensland in 1969, and a PhD from Australian National University in 1973.

Farquhar was appointed Professor of the Australian National University’s Research School of Biology and Chief Investigator of the Australian Research Council's Centre of Excellence for Translational Photosynthesis. His work to model plant biophysics has helped to understand how cells, whole plants and whole forests work, and to create new water-efficient wheat varieties. His latest project is attempting to determine which trees will grow faster in a high carbon dioxide atmosphere.

In 2014 Farquhar, along with CSIRO agronomist Richard Richards, was awarded the Rank Prize in Nutrition, for "pioneering the understanding of isotope discrimination in plants and its application to breed wheat varieties that use water more efficiently", which related to a discovery the pair made in the 1980s.

Farquhar was awarded the Prime Minister's Prize for Science in 2015 for his modelling of photosynthesis and the Macfarlane Burnet Medal and Lecture by the Australian Academy of Science in 2016. In 2017 he was the recipient of the Kyoto Prize in Basic Sciences (Biology). In 2025 he was awarded the Royal Medal of the Royal Society.

On 25 January 2018, Farquhar was named Senior Australian of the Year. By the number of citations, he is the most cited author of some plant science journals such as Planta, Plant, Cell and Environment, Functional Plant Biology.

== See also ==
- Global terrestrial stilling
- Farquhar Equations
