= Hiroo Inokuchi =

Japanese chemist and Kyoto prize winner

- 井口 洋夫
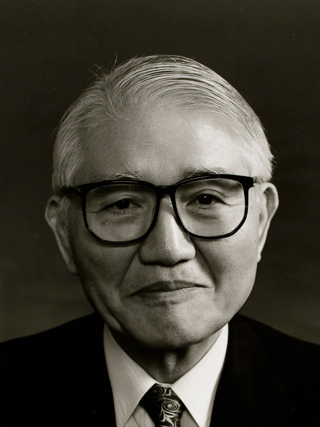
- Inokuchi in 2020
- Born: February 23, 1927; Hiroshima, Japan
- Died: March 20, 2014 (aged 87)
- Citizenship: Japanese
- Known for: Organic semiconductors
- Awards: Order of Culture, Kyoto Prize in Advanced Technology
- Scientific career
- Fields: Chemistry
- Workplaces: University of Tokyo, National Institutes of Natural Sciences, Japan,

Hiroo Inokuchi (23 Feb 1927 – 20 March 2014) was a Japanese chemist who did pioneering work in electronic processes in organic materials, for which he received the 2007 Kyoto Prize in Advanced Technology. Since 2006, he was the chairman of the Japan Space Forum.

== Career ==
Inokuchi contributed to many branches of the field of electronic processes in organic materials, including luminescence, photoemission, and spectroscopy.

== Honors ==
Inokuchi was a member of the Japan Academy and the Chinese Academy of Sciences. In 1965, the Japan Academy awarded him the Japan Academy Prize. In 1978 he received the Chemical Society of Japan Award from the Chemical Society of Japan. In 1994, the Japanese government recognized him as a Person of Cultural Merit and in 2001 they awarded him the Order of Culture. In 2007 he received the Kyoto Prize in Advanced Technology.

The asteroid 32270 Inokuchihiroo, discovered in 2000, was named after Inokuchi. In May, 2018, the Tokyo Physical and Chemical Research Institute opended the Hiroo Inokuchi Hall.

== Works ==
=== Books ===
- Inokuchi, Hiroo (1964). Organic semiconductors. (In Japanese). Maki Shoten Publishing.

=== Journal articles ===
- Akamatu, Hideo; Inokuchi, Hiroo. "On the Electrical Conductivity of Violanthrone, Iso-Violanthrone, and Pyranthrone". The Journal of Chemical Physics. 18 (6): 810. doi:10.1063/1.1747780.
- Inokuchi, Hiroo. "Photoconductivity of the Condensed Polynuclear Aromatic Compounds". Bulletin of the Chemical Society of Japan. 27 (1): 22–27. doi:10.1246/bcsj.27.22.
- Akamatu, Hideo; Inokuchi, Hiroo; Matsunaga, Yoshio (23 January 1954). "Electrical Conductivity of the Perylene–Bromine Complex". Nature. 173 (4395): 168–169. doi:10.1038/173168a0.
- Sato, Naoki; Seki, Kazuhiko; Inokuchi, Hiroo. "Polarization energies of organic solids determined by ultraviolet photoelectron spectroscopy". Journal of the Chemical Society, Faraday Transactions 2. 77 (9): 1621. doi:10.1039/f29817701621.
- Inokuchi, Hiroo; Saito, Gunzi; Wu, Peiji; Seki, Kazuhiko; Tang, Tong Bor; Mori, Takehiko; Imaeda, Kenichi; Enoki, Toshiaki; Higuchi, Yoshiki; Inaka, Koji; Yasuoka, Noritake. "A novel type of organic semiconductors. Molecular fastener". Chemistry Letters (8): 1263–1266. doi:10.1246/cl.1986.1263.
