= Michael Szwarc =

British-American polymer chemist

Michael Szwarc (9 June 1909, Będzin, Poland – 4 August 2000, San Diego, California) was a British and American polymer chemist who discovered and studied ionic living polymerization.

== Biography ==
Michael Mojżesz Szwarc was born into a Polish-Jewish family in Będzin, Poland. In 1932 he received the title of engineer in chemistry at the Warsaw University of Technology. In 1935 he emigrated to Palestine, where he joined his sister and cousin. In 1942 he defended his first Ph.D. dissertation in organic chemistry at Hebrew University in Jerusalem.

In 1945 he joined Michael Polanyi's research group at the University of Manchester in the UK. In 1947 he defended his second Ph.D. thesis, this time in physical chemistry. Two years later, he was awarded D.Sc. for work on measurements of energy distribution of chemical bonds, and was promoted to senior lecturer at the University of Manchester.

In 1952 Michael Szwarc moved to the United States and was a professor of physical chemistry and polymers at the State University of New York College of Environmental Science and Forestry in Syracuse. He created his own research team at SUNY, developing living polymerization techniques in accordance with his long-term program published in Nature in 1956, in which he introduced the living polymerization term for the first time. In 1964 he received a Distinguished Professor at SUNY, and in 1967 he founded the Center for Research Polymers, which he led until his retirement in 1979.

At SUNY he was a consultant for scientific projects conducted by Union Carbide, Dow Corning, Dow Chemical and 3M. After retirement he moved to Loker Hydrocarbon Research Institute at USC, where he continued his scientific work, in collaboration with former students from SUNY. He focused on solving practical problems associated with the living polymerization techniques in the industry. He also wrote several books and monographs about polymer chemistry synthesis.

Michael Szwarc and his Polish wife, Marysia (Maria), had three children - a son and two daughters. He played piano and was a long-distance open water swimmer.

== Awards and memberships ==
- Fellow of The Royal Society (1966)
- Foreign member of Nobel Prize Committee (1968–72)
- The American Chemical Society Award: Witco Award in Polymer Chemistry (1969); Award of the Division of Polymer Chemistry (1990)
- Kyoto Prize(1991)
- International Award of the Plastics Engineers (1972)
- Gold Medal of Benjamin Franklin's Association (1978)
- Foreign member of Polish Academy of Sciences (1988)
- honoris causa' of: Leuven University (1974), Uppsala University, Pasteur Institute (1978), Jagiellonian University (2000)
