= Fukumi Shimura =

Japanese textile artist (born 1924)

- Shimura Fukumi
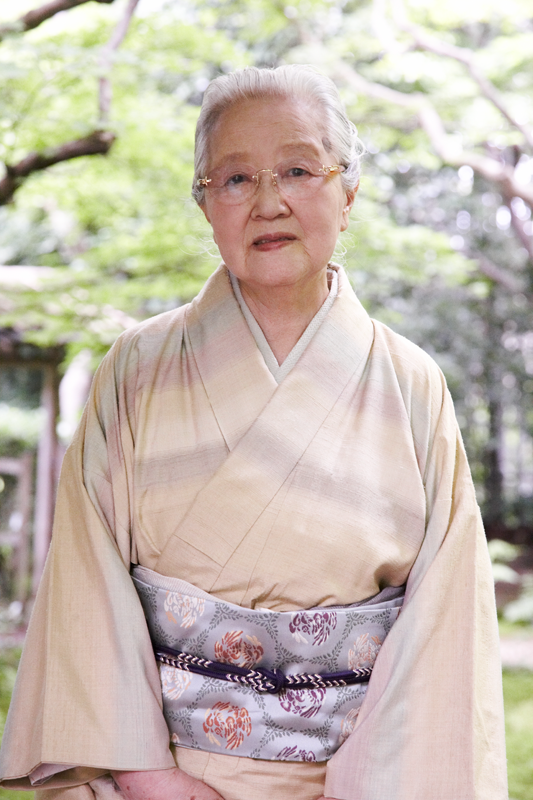
- Born: 30 September 1924 (age 101); Omihachiman, Japan
- Movement: Mingei
- Awards: Kyoto Prize in Arts and Philosophy; 2014

Fukumi Shimura (志村ふくみ; born 30 September 1924) is a Japanese textile artist who has created kimono since 1958. Shimura was awarded multiple honours including the Living National Treasure in 1990 and the 2014 Kyoto Prize in Arts and Philosophy.

== Early life and education ==
Shimura was born in Omihachiman, Japan on 30 September 1924. She completed her education at Bunka Gakuin in 1942.

== Career ==
In 1955, Shimura began working in textile art. After meeting the Japanese artist Tatsuaki Kuroda, Shimura participated in an art event held by the Japan Kōgei Association in 1957. During her career, Shimura studied under artists Toshijiro Inagaki and Tomimoto Kenkichi. She has created numerous kimono since her first work in 1958 entitled "Autumn Mist".

In 2015, Shimura's art was shown at the Museum of Modern Art, Shiga. In 2016, Shimura had exhibitions at the National Museum of Modern Art, Kyoto and the Okinawa Prefectural Museum.

Apart from her creations in textile art, Shimura created spaces for textile art learning with her daughter. In 1989, Shimura and her daughter opened up a work space for textile art and a religious spot for weaving in 2013. Shimura also wrote books that were awarded the Nihon Essayist Club Prize and the Osaragi Jirō Prize.

== Awards and honors ==
Shimura was awarded the Medal with Purple Ribbon in 1986, named a Living National Treasure in 1990 and given the Person of Cultural Merit honor in 1993. Other honors Shimura was bestowed with include the 2014 Kyoto Prize in Arts and Philosophy and the Order of Culture the following year.

== Personal life ==
Shimura is the mother of Yoko Shimura, who is also a textile artist.
