= Izuo Hayashi =

Japanese physicist

- Born: May 1, 1922; Tokyo, Japan
- Died: September 26, 2005 (aged 83)
- Scientific career
- Fields: Physics

Izuo Hayashi (林 厳雄, Hayashi Izuo) (May 1, 1922 – September 26, 2005) was a Japanese physicist.

Hayashi was born in Tokyo in 1922 and graduated from the faculty of science, University of Tokyo in 1946. He worked as assistant professor at the Institute for Nuclear Research of the same university and defended his PhD in 1962. After the PhD defense, he stayed for a year at MIT, and between 1964 and 1971 worked at Bell Labs on semiconductor lasers. In 1970, Hayashi helped develop the first room-temperature continuous-wave semiconductor injection laser with double heterostructure. In 1971 he joined the Research Laboratories of NEC where he continued his studies of semiconductor lasers, aiming to improve their reliability and lifetime. Between 1982 and 1987 he was a head scientist at NEC, and in 1987–1994 became director of the Optoelectronics Technology Research Laboratory in Tsukuba. From 1994 until retirement in 1996, he served as advisor in the same laboratory. Hayashi died of acute leukemia in 2005.

== Awards and honors ==
- Fujihara Award, Japan (1946)
- Prize from Institute of Electronics and Communication Engineers, Japan (1975)
- J J Ebers Award, IEEE (1984)
- Asahi Prize, Japan (1986)
- C&C Prize (with Morton B. Panish), Japan (1986)
- IEEE David Sarnoff Award (1988)
- Marconi Prize (1993)
- Applied Physics Society Prize, Japan (2001)
- Kyoto Prize, Japan (2001)
