= Kyoto Prize =

The Kyoto Prize
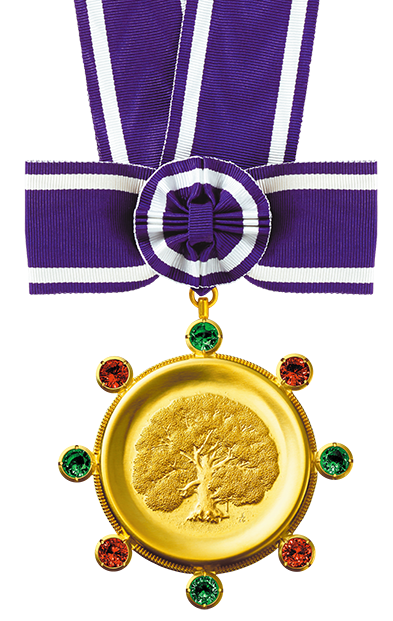
- Insignia of the prize.
- Awarded for: Lifetime achievement in Advanced Technology, Basic Sciences, Arts and Philosophy
- Location: ICC Kyoto
- Country: Japan
- Presented by: Inamori Foundation
- Rewards: A diploma, a Kyoto Prize medal (20K gold), and prize money of 100million yen per category.
- First award: 1985
- Website: www.kyotoprize.org/en/
- Ribbon of the prize

The Kyoto Prize (京都賞, Kyōto-shō) is Japan's highest private award for lifetime achievement in the arts and sciences. It is given not only to those who are top representatives of their own respective fields, but to "those who have contributed significantly to the scientific, cultural, and spiritual betterment of mankind". The Kyoto Prize was established in 1984, and the laureates have been annually awarded since 1985. It is regarded by many as Japan's version of the Nobel Prize, representing one of the most prestigious awards available in fields that are not traditionally honored with a Nobel.

The prizes are endowed with 100 million yen per category and have been awarded annually since 1985 by the Inamori Foundation, founded by Kazuo Inamori. The laureates are announced each June; the prize presentation ceremony and related events are held in Kyoto, Japan, each November.

== Categories and fields ==
The Kyoto Prize consists of three different categories, each with four subfields. The subfields rotate every year to create a diverse group of Laureates. The categories and fields are:

Kyoto Prize in Advanced Technology

With fields: Electronics, Biotechnology and Medical Technology, Materials Science and Engineering, and Information Science.

Kyoto Prize in Basic Sciences

With fields: Biological Sciences (Evolution, Behavior, Ecology, Environment), Mathematical Sciences (including Pure Mathematics), Earth and Planetary Sciences, Astronomy and Astrophysics, and Life Sciences and Medicine (Molecular Biology, Cell Biology, Systems Biology, etc.).

Kyoto Prize in Arts and Philosophy

With Fields: Music, Arts (Painting, Sculpture, Craft, Architecture, Photography, Design, etc.), Theater, Cinema, and Thought and Ethics

== Laureates ==
With the 2024 Kyoto laureates, the three-category prizes have honored 123 individuals and one foundation (the Nobel Foundation). Individual laureates range from scientists, engineers, and researchers to philosophers, painters, architects, sculptors, musicians, and film directors.

Laureates are invited to the Kyoto Prize Symposium in San Diego, California each March, and to the Blavatnik School of Government at the University of Oxford each May to give presentations on their work.

== See also ==
- List of general science and technology awards
- Kyoto Prize in Advanced Technology
- Kyoto Prize in Basic Sciences
- Kyoto Prize in Arts and Philosophy
- List of Kyoto Prize winners
