= Inamori Foundation =

Japanese foundation

- Formation: April 12, 1984
- Founder: Kazuo Inamori
- Headquarters: Kyoto, Japan
- Coordinates: 35°00′11″N 135°45′33″E
- Chairperson: Shigetada Nakanishi
- Endowment: 114.5 billion Japanese yen
- Website: www.inamori-f.or.jp

The Inamori Foundation is a private foundation known for its annual announcement of the Kyoto Prize, founded by Kazuo Inamori in 1984. It reflects "the lifelong beliefs of its founder that people have no higher calling than to strive for the greater good of humankind and society and that the future of humanity can be assured only when there is a balance between scientific development and the enrichment of the human spirit." It has an endowment of 114.5 billion yen as of March 31, 2019. The honorary president of the foundation is Princess Takamado.

== Research grants ==
In addition to awarding the Kyoto Prize, the foundation is also responsible for giving out research grants and fellowships.

== See also ==
- Kyoto Prize
