= Washington Award =

American engineering award

The Washington Award is an American engineering award.

Since 1916, it has been given annually for "accomplishments which promote the happiness, comfort, and well-being of humanity". It is awarded jointly by the following engineering societies: American Institute of Mining, Metallurgical, and Petroleum Engineers, American Nuclear Society, American Society of Civil Engineers, American Society of Mechanical Engineers, Institute of Electrical and Electronics Engineers, National Society of Professional Engineers, and Western Society of Engineers (which administers the award).

== Honorees ==
Source: The Washington Award

- Herbert C. Hoover, 1919
- Robert W. Hunt, 1922
- Arthur N. Talbot, 1924
- Jonas Waldo Smith, 1925
- John Watson Alvord, 1926
- Orville Wright, 1927
- Michael Idvorsky Pupin, 1928
- Bion Joseph Arnold, 1929
- Mortimer Elwyn Cooley, 1930
- Ralph Modjeski, 1931
- William David Coolidge, 1932
- Ambrose Swasey, 1935
- Charles Franklin Kettering, 1936
- Frederick Gardner Cottrell, 1937
- Frank Baldwin Jewett, 1938
- Daniel Webster Mead, 1939
- Daniel Cowan Jackling, 1940
- Ralph Budd, 1941
- William Lamont Abbott, 1942
- Andrey Abraham Potter, 1943
- Henry Ford, 1944
- Arthur Holly Compton, 1945
- Vannevar Bush, 1946
- Karl Taylor Compton, 1947
- Ralph Edward Flanders, 1948
- John Lucian Savage, 1949
- Wilfred Sykes, 1950
- Edwin Howard Armstrong, 1951
- Henry Townley Heald, 1952
- Gustav Egloff, 1953
- Lillian Moller Gilbreth, 1954
- Charles Erwin Wilson, 1955
- Robert E. Wilson, 1956
- Walker Lee Cisler, 1957
- Ben Moreell, 1958
- James R. Killian, Jr., 1959
- Herbert Payne Sedwick, 1960
- William V. Kahler, 1961
- Alexander C. Monteith, 1962
- Philip Sporn, 1963
- John Slezak, 1964
- Glenn Theodore Seaborg, 1965
- Augustus Braun Kinzel, 1966
- Frederick Lawson Hovde, 1967
- James B. Fisk, 1968
- Nathan M. Newmark, 1969
- H.G. Rickover, 1970
- William L. Everitt, 1971
- Thomas Otten Paine, 1972
- John A. Volpe, 1973
- John D. deButts, 1974
- David Packard, 1975
- Ralph B. Peck, 1976
- Michael Tenenbaum, 1977
- Dixy Lee Ray, 1978
- Marvin Camras, 1979
- Neil Armstrong, 1980
- John E. Swearingen, 1981
- Manson Benedict, 1982
- John Bardeen, 1983
- Robert W. Galvin, 1984
- Stephen D. Bechtel, 1985
- Mark Shepherd Jr., 1986
- Grace Murray Hopper, 1987
- James McDonald, 1988
- Sherwood L. Fawcett, 1989
- John H. Sununu, 1990
- Frank Borman, 1991
- Leon M. Lederman, 1992
- William States Lee, 1993
- Kenneth H. Olson, 1994
- George W. Housner, 1995
- Wilson Greatbatch, 1996
- Frank Kreith, 1997
- John R. Conrad, 1998
- Jack S. Kilby, 1999
- Donna Lee Shirley, 2000
- Dan Bricklin, 2001
- Bob Frankston, 2001
- Richard J. Robbins, 2002
- Eugene Cernan, 2003
- Nick Holonyak, 2004
- Robert S. Langer, 2005
- Henry Petroski, 2006
- Michael J. Birck, 2007
- Dean Kamen, 2008
- Clyde N. Baker, Jr., 2009
- Alvy Ray Smith, 2010
- Martin C. Jischke, 2011
- Martin Cooper, 2012
- Kristina M. Johnson, 2013
- Bill Nye, 2014
- Bernard Amadei, 2015
- Aprille Joy Ericsson, 2016
- Chuck Hull, 2017
- Ivan Sutherland, 2018
- Margaret Hamilton, 2019
- Richard A. Berger, 2020
- John B. Goodenough, 2021
- John A. Rogers, 2022
- Gwynne Shotwell, 2023
- Robert Kahn & Vint Cerf, 2024
- Markus J. Buehler, 2025

== See also ==
- List of engineering awards
