= Frank Kreith =

American mechanical engineer (1922–2018)

- Born: 15 December 1922; Vienna, Austria
- Died: 8 January 2018 (aged 95)
- Education: University of California, Berkeley; University of California, Los Angeles; University of Paris
- Known for: Principles of Heat Transfer
- Awards: ASME Thurston Lecture Award (1991); ASMEASME Medal (1998); John Fritz Medal (2017)
- Scientific career
- Fields: Mechanical engineering, heat transfer, solar energy
- Workplaces: Jet Propulsion Laboratory; University of California, Berkeley; Lehigh University; University of Colorado Boulder; Solar Energy Research Institute

Frank Kreith (15 December 1922 – 8 January 2018) was an American mechanical engineer known for his work in heat transfer and solar energy, and for the widely used textbook Principles of Heat Transfer.

== Early life and education ==
Kreith was born in Vienna in 1922. He fled Austria after the annexation of Austria into Nazi Germany in 1938 as a member of the Kindertransport. He obtained degrees from the University of California, Berkeley (1945), the University of California, Los Angeles (1949) and the University of Paris (1965).

== Career ==
Kreith worked at the Jet Propulsion Laboratory and received a fellowship from the Daniel and Florence Guggenheim Foundation to study at Princeton University. He taught at Berkeley and Lehigh University before becoming a faculty member at the University of Colorado Boulder in 1959. He was head of the Solar Thermal Conversion research branch at the Solar Energy Research Institute (SERI) and subsequently served as the ASME Legislative Fellow at the National Conference of State Legislatures, advising lawmakers on energy and environmental issues.

His contributions to Mechanical Engineering were recognized with many of the highest awards in the field, including the Robert Henry Thurston Lecture Award, which Kreith received in 1991. This is the oldest named lectureship in mechanical engineering, presented annually by ASME to an engineer for notable contributions to the field.

== Research and publications ==
Kreith published more than 100 articles in peer-reviewed journals and authored or edited 15 books, among them the textbook Principles of Heat Transfer. He was editor-in-chief of the Journal of Solar Energy Engineering from 1980 to 1987.

== Honors and awards ==
- 1981 Worcester Reed Warner Medal, American Society of Mechanical Engineers (ASME)
- 1985 Max Jakob Memorial Award, ASME and American Institute of Chemical Engineers (AIChE)
- 1988 Charles Greeley Abbot Award, American Solar Energy Society (ASES)
- 1991 Robert Henry Thurston Lecture Award, ASME
- 1992 Ralph Coats Roe Medal, ASME
- 1997 Washington Award, Western Society of Engineers
- 1998 ASME Medal
- 2001 Edwin F. Church Medal, ASME
- since 2006 Namesake of the Frank Kreith Energy Award, ASME
- 2017 John Fritz Medal, American Association of Engineering Societies

== Selected bibliography ==
- Principles of Heat Transfer. International Textbook Company, Scranton, 1958. (8 editions)
- Frank Kreith and Jan F. Kreider: Principles of Solar Engineering. Hemisphere Publication Corporation, Washington, D.C., 1978. ISBN 0-07-035476-6
- Jan F. Kreider and Frank Kreith (eds.): Solar Energy Handbook. McGraw-Hill, New York, 1981. ISBN 0-07-035474-X
- Handbook of Solid Waste Management. McGraw-Hill, New York, 1994. ISBN 0-07-035876-1
- Frank Kreith (ed.): The CRC Handbook of Thermal Engineering. CRC Press, Boca Raton, 2000. ISBN 3-540-66349-5
- Frank Kreith and D. Yogi Goswami (eds.): Handbook of Energy Efficiency and Renewable Energy. CRC Press, Boca Raton, 2007. ISBN 978-0-8493-1730-9
- Sunrise Delayed: A Personal History of Solar Energy. CreateSpace, 2014. ISBN 978-1-5001-2487-8
