= Robert W. Hunt =

American metallurgical engineer

Robert Woolston Hunt
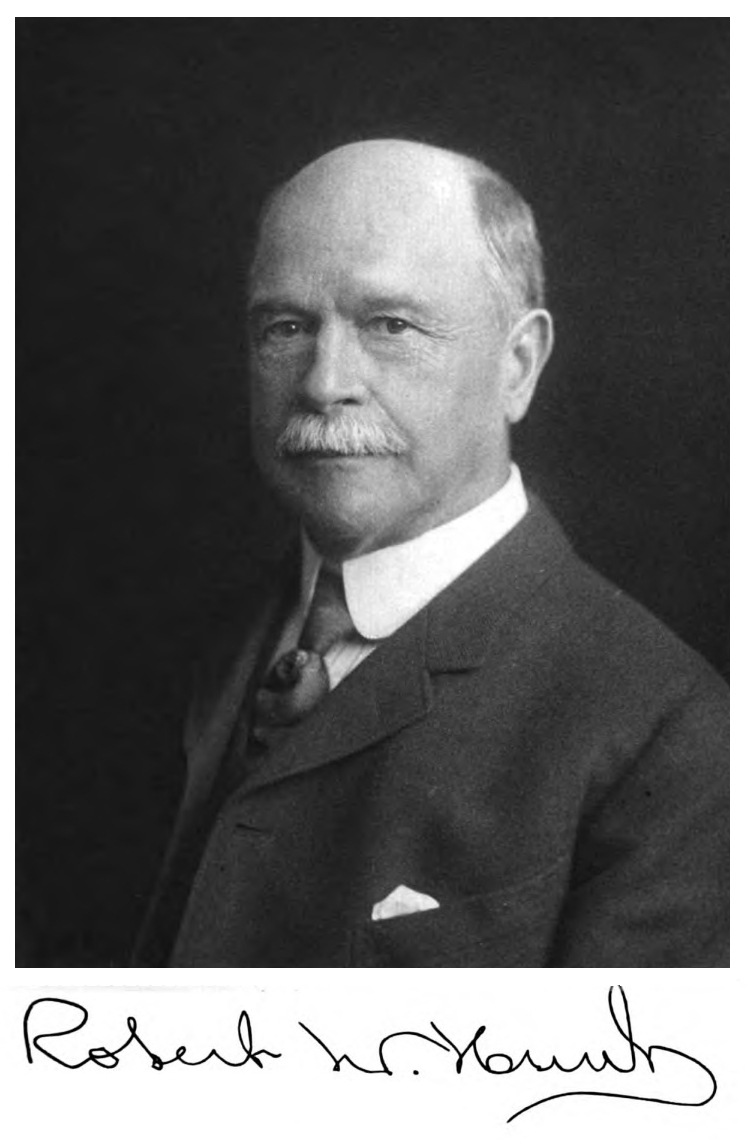
- Born: December 9, 1838; Fallsington, Pennsylvania
- Died: July 11, 1923 (aged 84); Chicago, Illinois
- Occupation: Engineer
- Spouse: Eleanor Clark
- Parent(s): Robert A. Hunt; Martha Lancaster Woolston
- Awards: John Fritz Medal (1912)

Robert Woolston Hunt (December 9, 1838 – July 11, 1923) was an American metallurgical engineer, inventor, and superintendent in the steel industry. He was president of the American Institute of Mining Engineers in 1883 and 1906; president of the American Society of Mechanical Engineers in the year 1891–92; and president of the Western Society of Engineers in 1893.

== Biography ==
=== Early career ===
Born in Fallsington, Pennsylvania, he was the only son of Dr. Robert A. Hunt and Martha Lancaster Woolston. His father, a graduate of Princeton College and University of Pennsylvania, was a practicing physician. However, health issues led to him leaving his practice and moving with his family to Covington, Kentucky, where he ran a pharmacy store. It was there that the young Hunt received his early education in the local public schools. Hunt's father died in 1855, which required his son to leave school at the age of 18 and take over his father's business.

With his health failing, in 1857 Robert W. Hunt had to sell the pharmacy business and then travel to Pottsville, Pennsylvania, to recuperate. He became employed at the John Burnish & Company, an iron rolling mill in Pottsville, where his cousin T. W. Yardley was a senior partner. At this mill he learned the skills of the iron working industry. In 1859 he joined Booth, Garrett & Reese, an analytical laboratory in Philadelphia, where he took a course in analytical chemistry. When his study was completed, in 1860 he joined Wood, Morrell & Co. as a chemist and established an iron and steel works laboratory in Johnstown, Pennsylvania, for the Cambria Iron Company. By the spring of 1861, he was working as night foreman for the Elmira rolling mill in Elmira, New York.

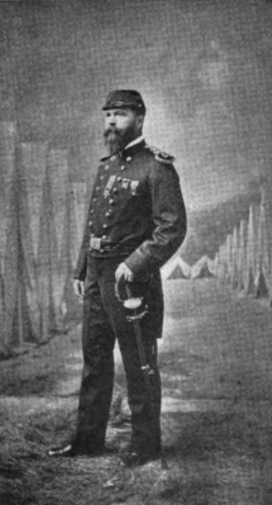
Hunt in command of Camp Curtin

Once the American Civil War began in 1861, he joined the Pennsylvania Volunteer Infantry, where he rose in rank from private to captain and was placed in charge of Camp Curtin in Harrisburg, Pennsylvania, during the fall of 1862. The following year he became the mustering officer for the state of Pennsylvania. In 1864 he helped recruit Captain Bruce Lambert's Independent Mounted Company, Pennsylvania volunteers. When the war ended in 1865, he was mustered out of the service with the rank of sergeant; yielding the rank of lieutenant to a friend.

=== Post-war period ===
Returning to civilian life, in July 1865 he went to work for the Cambria Co. and was named superintendent of the experimental Bessemer steel works in Wyandotte, Michigan. This was the first Bessemer steel plant to be operated in the United States. He remained in charge of the Wyandotte Bessemer Works until 1866, when he returned to Johnstown, where the Cambria Co. was erecting a Bessemer plant. Since the construction of this factory was not completed until July 1871, Cambria placed Hunt in charge of the process of rolling steel ingots into rail tracks for use by the Pennsylvania Railroad. Once the Cambria Bessemer plant was put into operation, Hunt, along with John E. Fry and Alexander L. Holley introduced a new bottom casting method for which the three received a patent.

Hunt remained with the Cambria Co. until September, 1873, when he became superintendent of the Bessemer works of John A. Griswald & Company in Troy, New York. He would remain with Griswald's company until 1888. In 1883 he was elected to serve a term as the president of the American Institute of Mining Engineers. Moving to Chicago in the spring of 1888, he started the business of Messrs. Robert W. Hunt & Company in April, which engaged in the business of inspection, testing, and consultation.

He was elected president of the American Society of Mechanical Engineers in November, 1890, serving his term during 1891–92. In 1893, he was named president of the Western Society of Engineers. He was again elected president of the American Institute of Mining Engineers in 1906. He became president of the American Society for Testing and Materials in 1912 and vice-president of the International Association for Testing Materials in 1914. On December 5, 1912, he was awarded the John Fritz Medal in New York for "his contributions to the early development of the Bessemer process". Named a trustee of Rensselaer Polytechnic Institute in 1886, he was bestowed the honorary degree of Doctor of Engineering by Rensselaer on June 4, 1916. In 1920, he was elected an honorary member of the American Society of Mechanical Engineers. In 1923 he received the Washington Award.

Hunt was married to Eleanor Clark in December 1866; the couple would have no children. He died at his home in Chicago on July 11, 1923.

His estate endowed the Hunt Professorship in Metallurgical Engineering at Rensselaer Polytechnic Institute. The Robert W. Hunt Company continues to operate to this day, becoming a subsidiary of U.S. Laboratories Inc. in 2001.
