= James Fisk =

James Fisk may refer to:

- James Fisk (financier) (1835–1872)
- James Brown Fisk (1910–1981), physicist
- James Fisk (politician) (1763–1844), U.S. Senator from Vermont
- James L. Fisk (c. 1845–1902), Union Army officer and leader of four expeditions to Montana
