= Daniel I.C. Wang =

American academic (1936–2020)

- 王義翹
- Born: March 12, 1936; Nanking, China
- Died: August 29, 2020 (aged 84); Cambridge, Massachusetts, U.S.
- Education: Massachusetts Institute of Technology (BS, MS); University of Pennsylvania (PhD)
- Scientific career
- Fields: Chemical and biological engineering
- Workplaces: Massachusetts Institute of Technology
- Doctoral advisor: Arthur E. Humphrey
- Notable students: Noubar Afeyan

Daniel I-Chyau Wang (Chinese: 王義翹; pinyin: Wáng Yìqiào；March 12, 1936 – August 29, 2020) was a Chinese-American chemical engineer. He was an Institute Professor at the Massachusetts Institute of Technology. He was known for founding the MIT Biotechnology Process Engineering Center and the expansion of the field of biochemical engineering.

== Career ==
Wang received his B.S. (1959) and M.S. (1961) from the Massachusetts Institute of Technology (MIT), and Ph.D. from in chemical engineering from the University of Pennsylvania in 1963 working with Arthur E. Humphrey on high‐temperature short‐time sterilization.

Wang joined the MIT faculty in 1965 as a member of the department of Nutrition and Food Science. In 1995, he was named an Institute Professor. While at MIT, he established joint programs with the National University of Singapore which would ultimately become a part of the Singapore-MIT Alliance for Research and Technology (SMART) Centre. His research on fermentation, monitoring and control of bioprocesses, renewable resource utilization, enzyme technology, product recovery and purification, protein aggregation and refolding, and mammalian cell cultures made him a pioneer in biochemical and biological engineering.

Wang was a member of the National Academy of Engineering, the American Academy of Arts and Sciences, and Academia Sinica. He co-authored five books and more than 250 papers in professional journals. He was a co-founder of the Society for Biological Engineering of the American Institute of Chemical Engineers. In 2019, the American Institute of Chemical Engineers established the D.I.C. Wang Award for Excellence in Biochemical Engineering in his honor.
