= Lewis Warrington Chubb =

American electrical engineer (1882–1952)

Lewis Warrington Chubb (October 22, 1882 – April 2, 1952) was an American electrical engineer, director of Westinghouse Research Laboratory, pioneer in radio broadcasting, and inventor, who was awarded the John Fritz Medal in 1947.

== Biography ==
Chubb was born in Fort Yates, Dakota Territory in 1882, the son of army officer Charles St. John Chubb and Sarah L. (Eaton) Chubb. He was raised in multiple army posts of the West, where "Indian uprisings were still flickering along the vanishing frontier."

In 1905 Chubb obtained his MSc from Ohio State University, and started his lifelong career at Westinghouse Electric Corporation as apprentice in research, development and testing. By 1920 he directed the radio engineering department, and from 1930 until his retirement in 1948 he was research director of the Director of Research.

Chubb was granted 150 patents. He was awarded the honorary doctor of science by the Allegheny College, and by the University of Pittsburgh. The Ohio State University awarded him the Benjamin G. Lamme Meritorious Achievement Medal, and in 1947 he was awarded the John Fritz Medal.

== Selected publications ==
- Lewis Warrington Chubb. The world within the atom : how scientists explored the atom and learned to release its energy, 1950.

Patents, a selection

- Warrington, Chubb Lewis. "Electrical precipitating system." U.S. Patent No. 1,399,422. 6 Dec. 1921.
- Lewis, Warrington Chubb. "Electropercussive welding." U.S. Patent No. 1,373,054. 29 Mar. 1921.
- Warrington, Chubb Lewis. "Emergency source of voltage." U.S. Patent No. 1,401,671. 27 Dec. 1921.
- Lewis, Warrington Chubb. "Means for producing high voltage." U.S. Patent No. 1,508,162. 9 Sep. 1924.
- Warrington, Chubb Lewis. "Light telephony." U.S. Patent No. 1,642,011. 13 Sep. 1927.
- Warrington, Chubb Lewis. "Vehicle lighting system." U.S. Patent No. 2,087,795. 20 Jul. 1937.
