= James Brown Fisk =

American businessman (1910–1981)

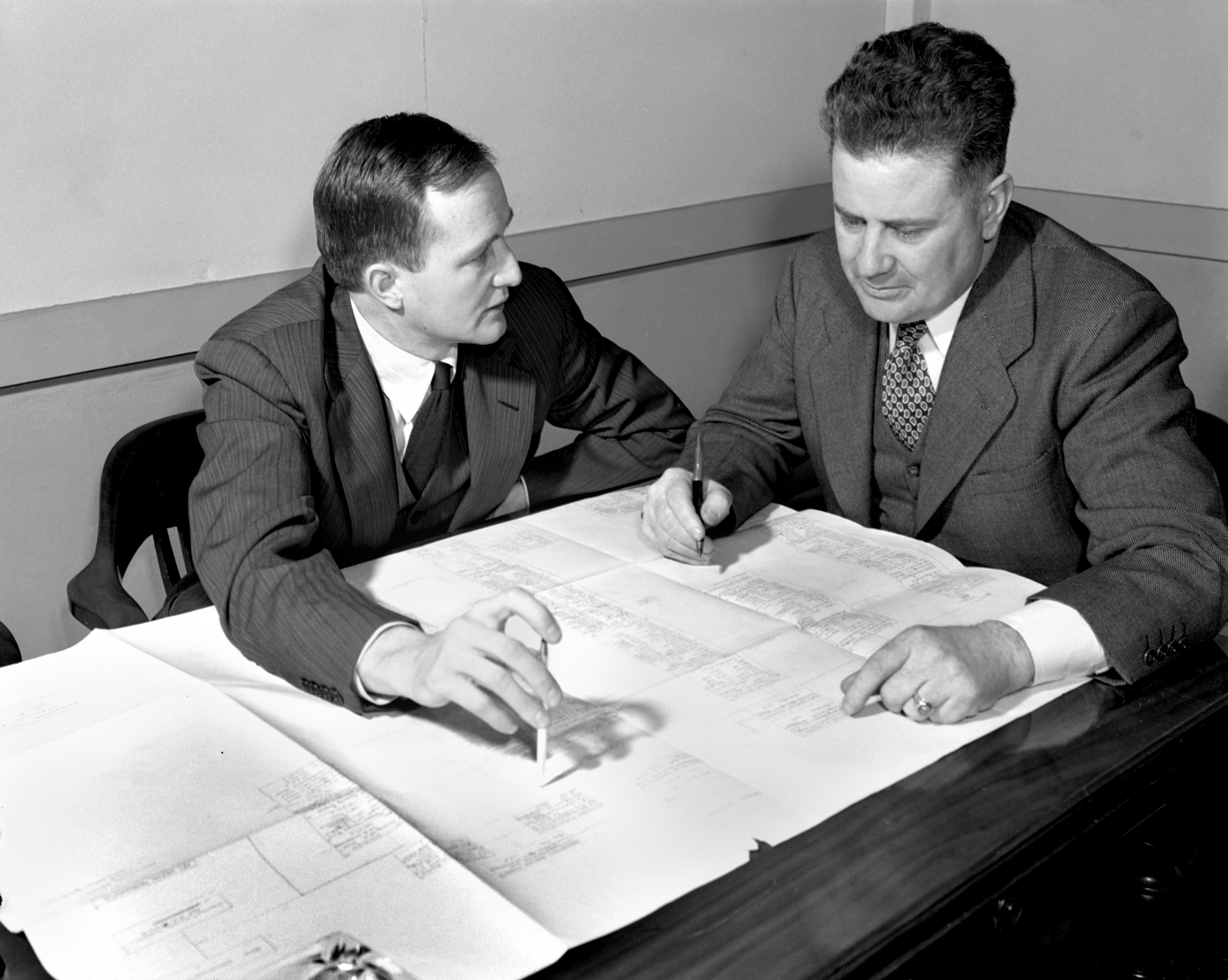
- James B. Fisk (left) in 1947

4th President of Bell Labs
- In office 1959–1973
- Preceded by: Mervin Kelly
- Succeeded by: William Oliver Baker

Personal details
- Born: August 30, 1910 West Warwick, Rhode Island
- Died: August 10, 1981 (aged 70) Elizabethtown, New York
- Education: Massachusetts Institute of Technology (B.S.) aeronautical engineering (1931); Massachusetts Institute of Technology (Ph.D.) theoretical physics (1935)

James Brown Fisk (August 30, 1910 – August 10, 1981) was president of Bell Labs from 1959 to 1973.

== Biography ==
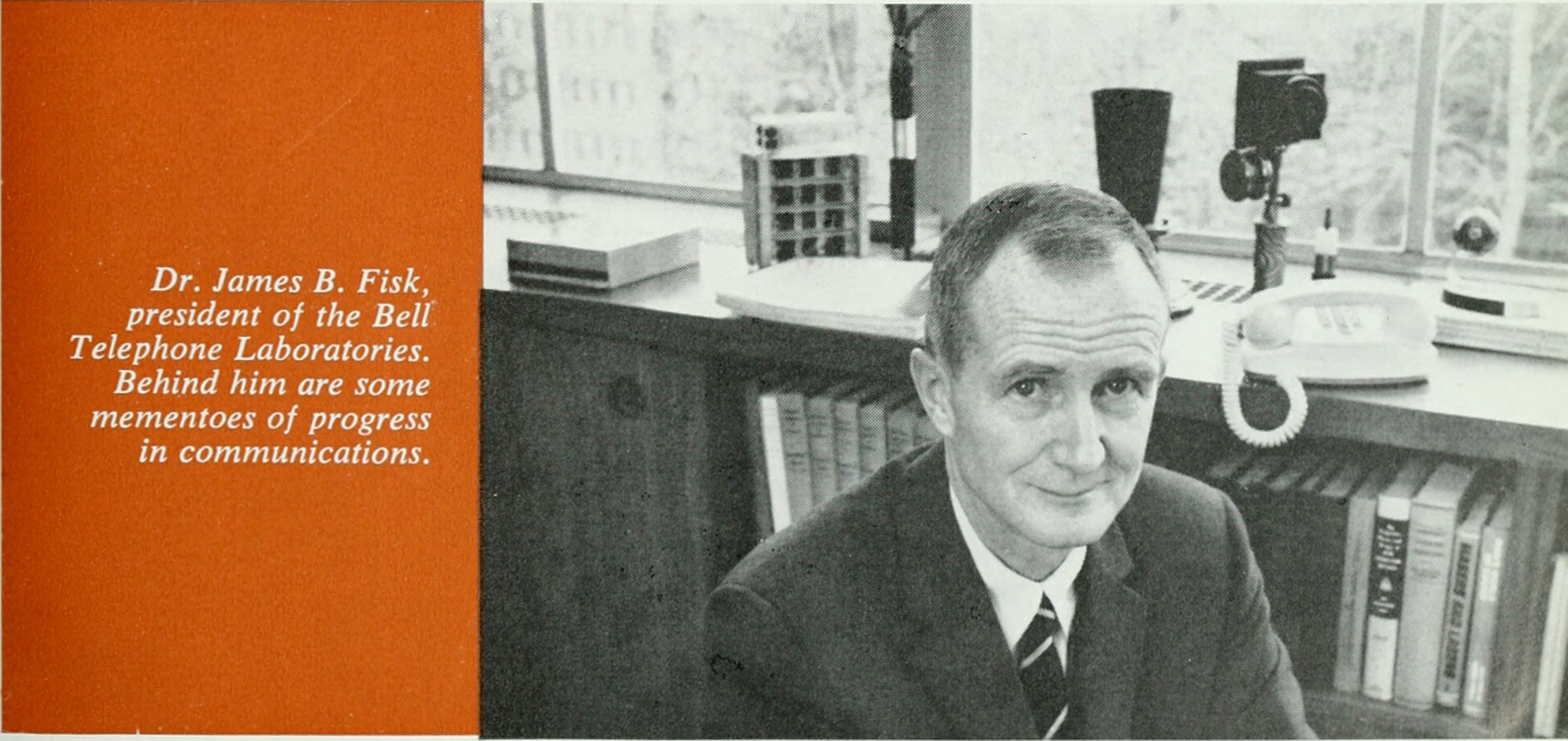
Dr. James B. Fisk as President of Bell Telephone Laboratories (Bell Labs.)

He was born on August 30, 1910, in West Warwick, Rhode Island.

He received his degrees from Massachusetts Institute of Technology, his Ph.D. dissertation was entitled “The Scattering of Electrons from Molecules.” He joined Bell Laboratories in 1939. He was named vice-president of research in 1954. He headed Bell Labs from 1959 to 1973. He was named chairman of the board of Bell Laboratories in 1973 and retired in 1974.

He lived in Basking Ridge, N.J. with his wife, Cynthia.

== Awards and honors ==
- Elected to the American Academy of Arts and Sciences (1949)
- Elected to the United States National Academy of Sciences (1954)
- Elected to the American Philosophical Society (1960)
- Medal of the Industrial Research Institute (1963)
- Washington Award of the Western Society of Engineers (1968)
- Advancement of Research Award of the American Society of Metals (1974)
- Hoover Medal (1975)
- Founders Medal from National Academy of Engineering. (1975)
