= George Tamaro =

American civil engineer

George J. Tamaro
- Born: 1937 (age 88–89); Weehawken, New Jersey, U.S.
- Education: Manhattan College (BS); Lehigh University (MS)
- Spouse: Rosemary Ann Volta (m. 1961)
- Engineering career
- Awards: John Fritz Medal (2005)

George J. Tamaro is an American civil engineer.

He obtained a bachelor's degree in civil engineering from Manhattan College in 1959 and graduated in 1961 with a master's degree in civil engineering at the P.C. Rossin College of Engineering and Applied Science.

In 1963, he won a fellowship to spend a year in Italy studying under Pier Luigi Nervi.

Tamaro is the 2005 recipient of the John Fritz Medal awarded by the American Association of Engineering Societies.
