= William L. Abbott =

American mechanical engineer

- Born: William Lamont Abbott; February 14, 1861
- Died: February 20, 1951 (aged 90)
- Education: University of Illinois at Urbana–Champaign, Mechanical Engineering (1884)

William Lamont Abbott (February 14, 1861 – February 20, 1951) was an American mechanical engineer, chief operating engineer of Commonwealth Edison, president of the board of trustees of the University of Illinois, and president of the American Society of Mechanical Engineers in 1926–27.

== Youth and early career ==
Abbott was born in Morrison, Illinois in Whiteside County as son of Asa McFarland Abbott and Sarah (Sperry) Abbott. He obtained his MSc in mechanical engineering in 1884 from the University of Illinois at Urbana–Champaign.

After his graduation in 1884, Abbott started his career as machinist and draftsman in the industry. In 1885 in cooperation with F. A. Wunder he founded Wunder & Abbott Illuminating Co, one of the first arc-lighting companies in Chicago, which supplied arc lighting service in the central business district of the city.

== Further career ==
The company Wunder & Abbott Illuminating, eventually, was bought by the Chicago Edison Co., the predecessors of Commonwealth Edison. From 1888 to 1894 Abbott was president and manager at the National Electric Construction Company. In 1894 he joined Commonwealth Edison, where he made it chief operating engineer. He retired in 1935, after 50 years in the industry.

During the 1920's, Abbott publicly argued that burning coal would create more arable land by warming arctic regions and would creating a year-round summer better for growing crops.

Abbott served as President of the Board of Trustees at the University of Illinois. In the year 1926-27 Abbott served as president of the American Society of Mechanical Engineers (ASME). In 1940, ASME elected him an honorary member. In 1942 he was awarded the Washington Award by the Western Society of Engineers. The University Power Plant of the University of Illinois, which entered service on September 1, 1940, was named after him.
