= Walker Lee Cisler =

American engineer (1897–1994)

- Born: October 8, 1897; Marietta, Ohio, U.S.
- Died: October 18, 1994 (aged 97); Grosse Pointe, Michigan, U.S.
- Resting place: Media Cemetery; Media, Pennsylvania, U.S.
- Education: Cornell University
- Spouse: Gertrude (died 1974)
- Children: 3
- Awards: Hoover Medal (1962); IEEE Edison Medal (1965); John Fritz Medal (1967)

Walker Lee Cisler (October 8, 1897 – October 18, 1994) was a noted American engineer, business executive, and a founding member of the National Academy of Engineering.

== Early life ==
Walker Lee Cisler was born on October 8, 1897, in Marietta, Ohio. Cisler received a degree in mechanical engineering from Cornell University in 1922. He was elected to the Sphinx Head Society during his senior year.

== Career ==
Cisler held a variety of positions at the Public Service Electric and Gas Company in New Jersey, before being named in 1941 as chief of the Equipment Production Branch at the U.S. War Production Board. In mid-1943 he became chief engineer of power plants for Detroit Edison. In 1944, he was granted leave of absence after being appointed as chief of public utilities for Supreme Headquarters Allied Expeditionary Force by General Dwight Eisenhower with responsibility for rebuilding electrical power plants in Europe. In this role, he served in Sicily, visited Russia, and in August 1944 entered Paris with General Charles de Gaulle. By 1945 the French electric system was generating more power than it had before the war.

After the war, Cisler returned to Detroit Edison as chief engineer, where he subsequently became executive vice president (1948), president (1951), chief executive officer (1954), and chairman of the board (1964). In 1967, Cisler became interested in supporting Northern Michigan University’s business programs. As a result of this, the University renamed the school of business the "Walker L. Cisler College of Business". He retired from Edison in 1975. He then established Overseas Advisory Associates Inc., a nonprofit to advise foreign countries on development of energy industries.

He was active in the early development of nuclear power, serving as executive secretary to the Atomic Energy Commission's Industrial Advisory Group in 1947-1948, and first president of the Atomic Industrial Forum. In 1991 the American Nuclear Society established a prize in honor of his contributions to development of fast breeder reactors.

Cisler was a founding member of the National Academy of Engineering, and a fellow of the Institute of Electrical and Electronics Engineers, American Institute of Management, and American Nuclear Society. He served as president of the American Society of Mechanical Engineers, Engineers Joint Council, and Edison Electric Institute, and received awards from the American Society of Mechanical Engineers, Western Society of Engineers, American Institute of Consulting Engineers, National Society of Professional Engineers, and the Institute of Electrical and Electronics Engineers.

== Personal life ==
Cisler married and had a son, but the son died at an early age after getting hit by a milk truck. His wife left him. He married Gertrude, who died in 1974. He had at least two other children, Richard Rippe and Jane Eckhardt.

In his later years, Cisler lived in Grosse Pointe, Michigan. Cisler died on October 18, 1994, at his home in Grosse Pointe. He was buried at Media Cemetery in Media, Pennsylvania.
