= Paul Dyer Merica =

American metallurgist

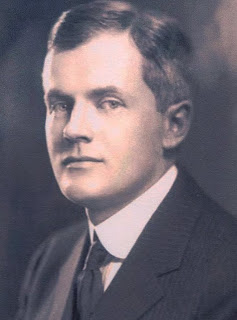
- Born: March 17, 1889; Warsaw, Indiana
- Died: October 20, 1957 (aged 68); Tarrytown, New York
- Education: University of Wisconsin (BA '08); University of Berlin (PhD '14)
- Spouse: Florence Young (m. 1917)

Paul Dyer Merica (March 17, 1889 – October 20, 1957) was an American metallurgist, president of the International Nickel Company of Canada Ltd., inventor, and recipient of the 1938 John Fritz Medal.

== Biography ==
=== Youth and education ===
Merica was born in Warsaw, Indiana, to Charles Oliver Merica and Alice White Merica. After attending the Warsaw Community High School and three years at DePauw University, he obtained his AB from the University of Wisconsin in 1907.

After his graduation Merica was instructor in physics University of Wisconsin for a year, and teacher of "Western subjects" at the Chekiang Provincial College at Hangzhou, China for another two years. From 1910 to 1914 he continued his studies at the University of Berlin, where he obtained his PhD in 1914.

=== Career and acknowledgement ===
After graduation back in the States he was research physicist at the United States Bureau of Standards for five years.

In 1919 he moved into the industry to the International Nickel Company, where he developed the first of the Inconel alloys (Inconel 600) to protect the nickel cookware market against competition by stainless steel.

Among his seminal contributions to the science of nickel were his 1924 study with Waltenberg on the non malleability of the metal. He was able to ascertain that the presence of sulfur is responsible for the property, and thus he was able to explain the 1879 work of Theodor Fleitmann.

He started as Director research, and worked his way up to Technical assistant to president in 1929, and furthermore to executive vice president, president and director from 1951 until his retirement in 1955.

In 1938 Merica was awarded the John Fritz Medal, in 1941 the platinum medal of the Institute of Materials, Minerals and Mining, in 1942 the Franklin Medal by the Franklin Institute, and in 1951 the gold medal of the American Society for Metals.

On October 29, 1964, the International Nickel Company dedicated a new research center, called the Paul D. Merica Research Laboratory, in Sterling Forest, New York.

== Publications ==
- Paul Dyer Merica. Ueber Beziehungen zwischen den mechanischen und den magnetischen Eigenschaften einiger Metalle bei elastischen und plastischen Formänderungen, 1914.
- George Kimball Burgess, Paul Dyer Merica. An investigation of fusible tin boiler plugs, 1915.
- Paul Dyer Merica. A simplification of the inverse-rate method for thermal analysis, 1919.
- Paul Dyer Merica. Nickel and its Alloys, National Bureau of Standards Circular 100, 1921.
- Paul Dyer Merica, Romaine George Waltenberg. Malleability and metallography of nickel, 1925.
- Paul Dyer Merica. "Personalities in Industry," Scientific American. July 1, 1938.
- Paul Dyer Merica. Charles Holmes Herty, Jr., 1896-1953, 1958.

Patents, a selection

- "Patent US1811696 - Carbon-free metal," 1931
- "Patent US2048163 - Iron-nickel-titanium alloy," 1936.
- "Patent US2048164 - Method of treating alloys," 1936.
