= Jerry Merryman =

American electrical engineer and inventor (1932–2019)

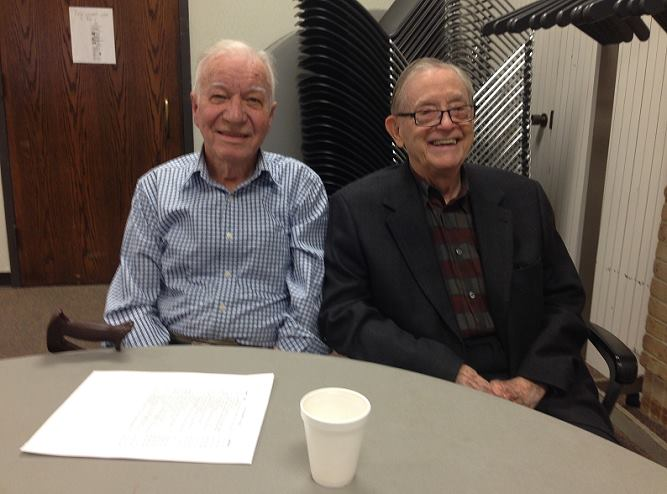
- Jerry Merryman and James R. Biard at the April 2016 meeting of the TI Vets.
- Born: June 17, 1932; Hearne, Texas, U.S.
- Died: February 27, 2019 (aged 86); Dallas, Texas, U.S.
- Education: Texas A&M University (did not graduate)
- Occupation: Electrical engineer
- Known for: Co-inventor of the hand-held calculator
- Spouses: Vernette Posey; Sally Simon; Phyllis Lee
- Children: 1 daughter

Jerry Dale Merryman (June 17, 1932 – February 27, 2019) was an American electrical engineer and inventor. He was a member of the team at Texas Instruments that developed the first pocket calculator in 1965.

== Early life ==
Merryman was born on June 17, 1932, near Hearne, Texas. He attended Texas A&M University but failed to graduate.

== Career ==
Merryman began his career at Texas Instruments in 1963. With Jack Kilby and James Van Tassel, he invented the hand-held calculator in 1965. Two years later, "The first patent for the calculator was filed." Merryman retired as an engineer for Texas Instruments in 1994 but continued to work for them as a consultant.

== Personal life and death ==
Merryman was married three times. He first married Vernette Posey, followed by Sally Simon, and finally Phyllis Lee. He had a daughter, Melissa.

Merryman died of heart and kidney failure on February 27, 2019, in Dallas, Texas, at age 86.

== Awards ==
- 1997: Stibitz-Wilson Award from the American Computer & Robotics Museum
