= Charles Metcalf Allen =

Hydraulic engineer

- Born: December 12, 1871; Walpole, Massachusetts, U.S.
- Died: August 15, 1950 (aged 78); Holden, Massachusetts, U.S.
- Education: Worcester Polytechnic Institute
- Awards: ASME Honorary Membership; ASME Warner Medal; John Fritz Medal
- Scientific career
- Fields: Hydraulic Engineering
- Institutions: Worcester Polytechnic Institute; Alden Research Laboratory

Charles Metcalf Allen (1871 in Walpole, Massachusetts – 1950 in Holden, Massachusetts) was a hydraulic engineer known particularly for his inventions and development of the Allen Salt-Velocity Method for measuring water discharge in situations where other methods or instruments could not be easily used. In 1936, Allen received the ASME Warner Medal, and in 1949, he received the John Fritz Medal. From 1906 to 1945, Charles Metcalf Allen served as professor of hydraulic engineering at Worcester Polytechnic Institute. During that period he also performed research at the Alden Hydraulic Laboratory
