= Schottky transistor =

Device that prevents a transistor from saturating

Device structure

A Schottky transistor is a combination of a transistor and a Schottky diode that prevents the transistor from saturating by diverting the excessive input current. It is also called a Schottky-clamped transistor.

== Mechanism ==
Symbol

Effective internal circuit composed of Schottky diode and bipolar junction transistor

Standard transistor–transistor logic (TTL) uses transistors as saturated switches. A saturated transistor is turned on hard, which means that it has a lot more base drive than it needs for the collector current it is drawing. The extra base drive creates a stored charge in the base of the transistor. The stored charge causes problems when the transistor needs to be switched from on to off: while the charge is present, the transistor is on; all the charge must be removed before the transistor will turn off. Removing the charge takes time (called storage time), so the result of saturation is a delay between the applied turn-off input at the base and the voltage swing at the collector. Storage time accounts for a significant portion of the propagation delay in the original TTL logic family.

Storage time can be eliminated and propagation delay can be reduced by keeping the switching transistors from saturating. Schottky transistors prevent saturation and the stored base charge. A Schottky transistor places a Schottky diode between the base and collector of the transistor. As the transistor comes close to saturating, the Schottky diode conducts and shunts any excess base drive to the collector. (This saturation avoidance technique is used in the 1956 Baker clamp.) The resulting transistors, which do not saturate, are Schottky transistors. The Schottky TTL logic families (such as S and LS) use Schottky transistors in critical places.

== Operation ==
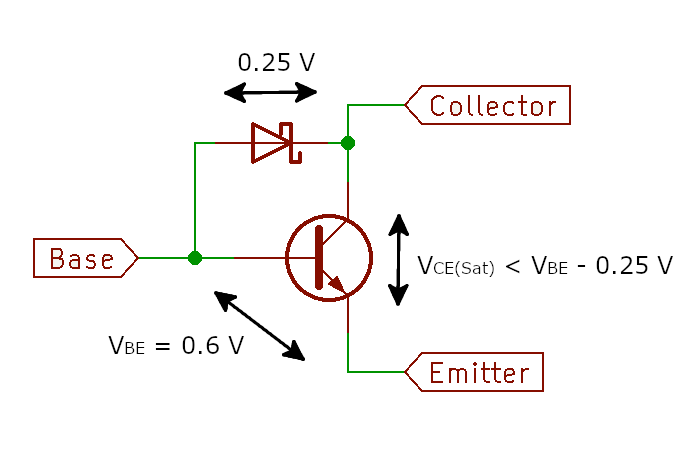
Operation of a Schottky transistor

When forward-biased, a Schottky diode's voltage drop 0.25 V is much less than a standard silicon diode's 0.6 V. In a standard saturated silicon transistor, the base-to-collector voltage is 0.6 V. In a Schottky transistor, the Schottky diode shunts current from the base into the collector before the transistor goes into saturation.

The input current which drives the transistor's base sees two paths: one path into the base and the other path through the Schottky diode and into the collector. When the transistor conducts, there will be about 0.6 V across its base–emitter junction. Typically, the collector voltage will be higher than the base voltage, and the Schottky diode will be reverse-biased. If the input current is increased, then the collector voltage falls below the base voltage, and the Schottky diode starts to conduct and shunt some of the base drive current into the collector. The transistor is designed so that its collector saturation voltage (V_{CE(sat)}) is less than the base–emitter voltage V_{BE} (roughly 0.6 V) minus the Schottky diode's forward voltage drop (roughly 0.2 V). Consequently, the excess input current is shunted away from the base, and the transistor never goes into saturation.

== History ==
In 1956, Richard Baker described some discrete diode clamp circuits to keep transistors from saturating. The circuits are now known as Baker clamps. One of those clamp circuits used a single germanium diode to clamp a silicon transistor in a circuit configuration that is the same as the Schottky transistor. The circuit relied on the germanium diode having a lower forward voltage drop than a silicon diode would have.

In 1964, James R. Biard filed a patent for the Schottky transistor. In his patent the Schottky diode prevented the transistor from saturating by minimizing the forward bias on the collector–base transistor junction, thus reducing the minority-carrier injection to a negligible amount. The diode could also be integrated on the same die, it had a compact layout, it had no minority-carrier charge storage, and it was faster than a conventional junction diode. His patent also showed how the Schottky transistor could be used in DTL circuits and improve the switching speed of saturated logic designs, such as the Schottky-TTL, at a low cost.

In 1971, Texas Instruments introduced the 74S TTL logic family with Schottky diodes. Later, it was included in the 74LS, 74AS, 74ALS, 74F TTL logic families too.

== See also ==
- Schottky barrier
