= John Fritz Medal =

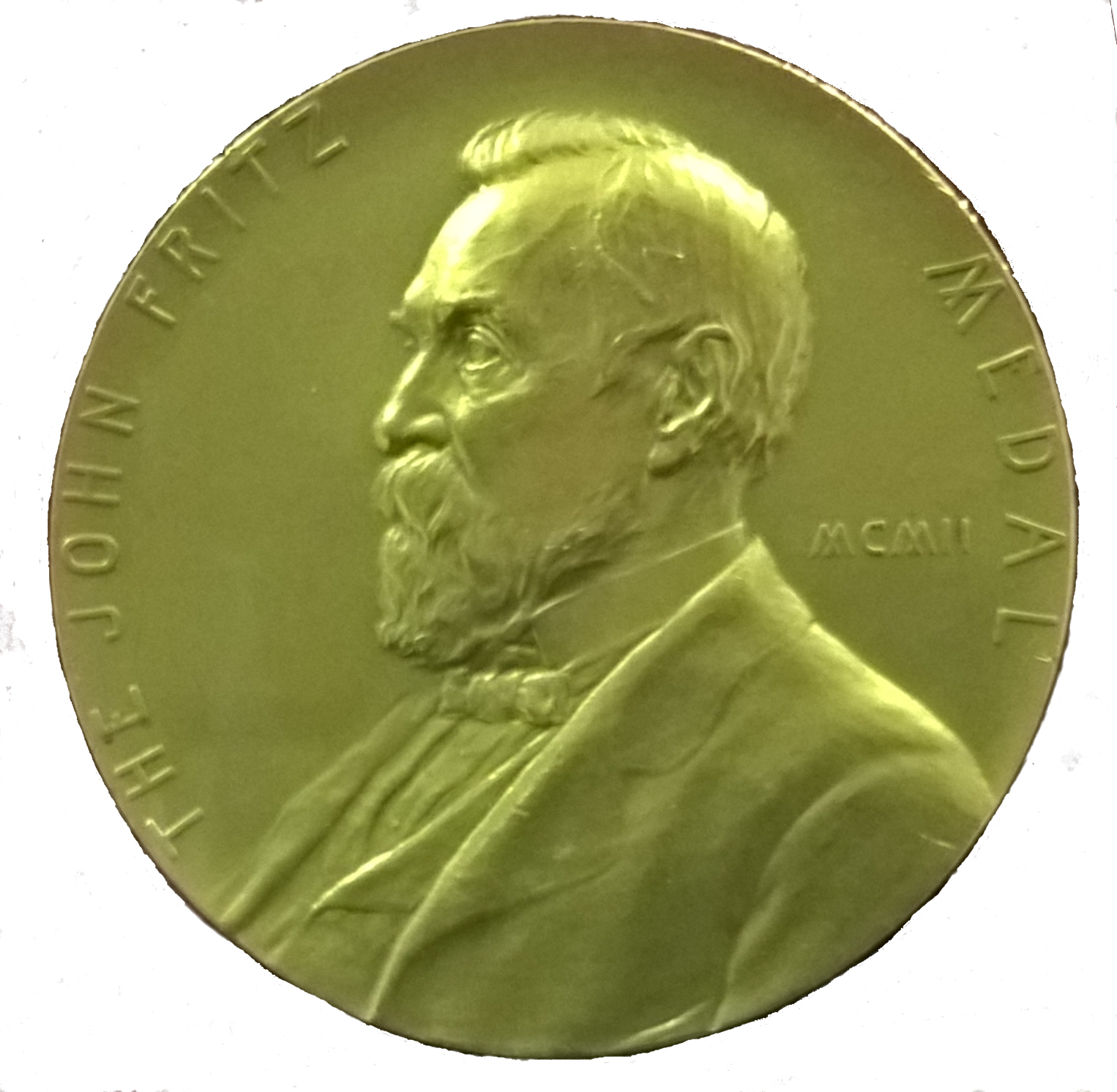
- Awarded for: Outstanding scientific or industrial achievements.
- Country: United States
- Presented by: American Institute of Mining, Metallurgical, and Petroleum Engineers
- First award: 1902; 124 years ago
- Website: John Fritz Medal Past Recipients

The John Fritz Medal has been awarded annually since 1902 by the American Association of Engineering Societies (AAES) for "outstanding scientific or industrial achievements". The medal was created for the 80th birthday of John Fritz, who lived between 1822 and 1913. When AAES was dissolved in 2020, the administration of the Fritz medal was transferred to the American Institute of Mining, Metallurgical, and Petroleum Engineers (AIME), and is currently coordinated by AIME member society, the Society of Mining, Metallurgy, & Exploration (SME).

The award is referred to as the "highest award in the engineering profession" by the AAES, and is further regarded by many as the "Nobel Prize in engineering".

== History ==
The John Fritz Medal is often described as the "Nobel Prize for engineering." This prestigious award is given annually for notable scientific or industrial achievements. It is granted to living people, but also posthumous. Since its initiation in 1902, there were six years when it was not awarded.

The John Fritz Medal board once consisted of sixteen representatives in four national societies in the fields of civil engineering, mining, metallurgical engineering, mechanical engineering and electrical engineering.

Among the most notable winners are Thomas Edison, Lord Kelvin, Alexander Graham Bell, George Westinghouse, Orville Wright, Charles F. "Boss" Kettering, Claude Shannon, Robert Noyce and Gordon Moore.

== Recipients ==
- 1902 John Fritz
- 1903 No award
- 1904 No award
- 1905 Lord Kelvin
- 1906 George Westinghouse
- 1907 Alexander Graham Bell
- 1908 Thomas Alva Edison
- 1909 Charles Talbot Porter
- 1910 Alfred Noble
- 1911 Sir William Henry White
- 1912 Robert Woolston Hunt
- 1913 No award
- 1914 John Edson Sweet
- 1915 James Douglas
- 1916 Elihu Thomson
- 1917 Henry Marion Howe
- 1918 J. Waldo Smith
- 1919 Gen. George W. Goethals
- 1920 Orville Wright
- 1921 Sir Robert Hadfield
- 1922 Charles P. E. Schneider
- 1923 Guglielmo Marconi
- 1924 Ambrose Swasey
- 1925 John Frank Stevens
- 1926 Edward Dean Adams
- 1927 Elmer Ambrose Sperry
- 1928 John Joseph Carty
- 1929 Herbert Clark Hoover
- 1930 Ralph Modjeski
- 1931 David Watson Taylor
- 1932 Mihajlo Idvorski Pupin
- 1933 Daniel Cowan Jackling
- 1934 John Ripley Freeman (posthumous)
- 1935 Frank Julian Sprague (posthumous)
- 1936 William Frederick Durand
- 1937 Arthur Newell Talbot
- 1938 Paul Dyer Merica
- 1939 Frank Baldwin Jewett
- 1940 Clarence Floyd Hirshfeld (posthumous)
- 1941 Ralph Budd
- 1942 Everette Lee DeGolyer
- 1943 Willis Rodney Whitney
- 1944 Charles F. Kettering
- 1945 John Lucian Savage
- 1946 Zay Jeffries
- 1947 Lewis Warrington Chubb
- 1948 Theodore von Karman
- 1949 Charles Metcalf Allen
- 1950 Walter H. Aldridge
- 1951 Vannevar Bush
- 1952 Ervin George Bailey
- 1953 Benjamin F. Fairless
- 1954 William Embry Wrather
- 1955 Harry Alonzo Winne
- 1956 Philip Sporn
- 1957 Ben Moreell
- 1958 John R. Suman
- 1959 Mervin J. Kelly
- 1960 Gwilym A. Price
- 1961 Stephen D. Bechtel
- 1962 Crawford H. Greenewalt
- 1963 Hugh L. Dryden
- 1964 Lucius D. Clay
- 1965 Frederick Kappel
- 1966 Warren K. Lewis
- 1967 Walker L. Cisler
- 1968 Igor Ivan Sikorsky
- 1969 Michael Lawrence Haider
- 1970 Glenn B. Warren
- 1971 Patrick E. Haggerty
- 1972 William Webster
- 1973 Lyman Dwight Wilbur
- 1974 H. I. Romnes
- 1975 Manson Benedict
- 1976 Thomas O. Paine
- 1977 George R. Brown
- 1978 Robert G. Heitz
- 1979 Nathan M. Newmark
- 1980 T. Louis Austin, Jr.
- 1981 Ian MacGregor
- 1982 David Packard
- 1983 Claude Elwood Shannon
- 1984 Kenneth A. Roe
- 1985 Daniel C. Drucker
- 1986 Simon Ramo
- 1987 Ralph Landau
- 1988 Ralph B. Peck
- 1989 Robert N. Noyce
- 1990 Gordon A. Cain
- 1991 Hunter Rouse
- 1992 Serge Gratch
- 1993 Gordon E. Moore
- 1994 Hoyt C. Hottel
- 1995 Lynn S. Beedle
- 1996 George N. Hatsopoulos
- 1997 Arthur E. Humphrey
- 1998 Ivan A. Getting
- 1999 George H. Heilmeier
- 2000 John W. Fisher
- 2001 Paul C. W. Chu
- 2002 Daniel S. Goldin
- 2003 Robert S. Langer
- 2004 John A. Swanson
- 2005 George Tamaro
- 2006 No award
- 2007 Gavriel Salvendy
- 2008 Kristina M. Johnson
- 2009 Yvonne Claeys Brill
- 2010 Gerald J. Posakony
- 2011 Andrew J. Viterbi
- 2012 Leslie E. Robertson
- 2013 Gregory Stephanopoulos
- 2014 Julia Weertman
- 2015 Jon D. Magnusson
- 2016 H. Vincent Poor
- 2017 Frank Kreith
- 2018 Anne S. Kiremidjian
- 2019 No award
- 2020 No award
- 2021 Elon Musk
- 2022 No award
- 2023 Asad M. Madni
- 2024 Alan Bovik
- 2025 M. C. Frank Chang

== See also ==
- List of engineering awards
- List of prizes named after people
