= John Robert Suman =

American petroluem geologist and executive

John Robert Suman (April 9, 1890, Daleville, Indiana – January 5, 1972, Houston, Texas) was a geologist, petroleum engineer, and business executive.

== Biography ==
As a child, John R. Suman emigrated with his family from Indiana to Southern California. After completing high school he matriculated at the University of Southern California. He transferred to the University of California, Berkeley, where he graduated from the Mining College with honors in 1912. After graduation he worked as an assistant geologist for the Houston-based Rio Bravo Oil Company, a Southern Pacific Railroad Company subsidiary that supplied oil to the railroad company and administered the land it owned. He worked under Dr. Edwin T. Dumble, a former director of the Texas Geological Survey, and William Kennedy, who in the early 1890s was the primary petroleum geologist working on the Texas Coastal Plain. After one year working for Rio Bravo, Suman was promoted of chief engineer. In 1917 he resigned from Rio Bravo and joined Roxana Petroleum Company, a subsidiary of Royal Dutch Shell. For two years he worked for Roxana Petroleum as technical superintendent for the company's operations in Texas and Louisiana. In 1919 he rejoined Rio Bravo as an assistant to the vice-president. He was promoted to general manager in 1925 and resigned from Rio Bravo in 1927. In 1923 he, along with several colleagues, formed the Houston Geological Society and served for two years as the Society's first president.

Suman's first major invention was the Double Pitman Pump for oilfield producing operations, which was patented in 1916. In his long and brilliant career, he played a key role in the development of the modern rotary drilling rig, the unitized drawworks, and in directing corporate engineering and research efforts that led to significant advances in reservoir engineering. In 1921, his book Petroleum Production Methods was published. It was one of the first contributions to the engineering literature that outlined the technology of the time and discussed the petroleum engineer's role in the industry. The book went through three editions and was a popular college textbook.

In 1927 John Suman began work for Humble Oil and Refining Company, chief operating subsidiary of Standard Oil Company of New Jersey. In 1933 he was appointed Humble Oil's vice president in charge of production at Houston. In 1933, near Conroe, Texas, a blowout occurred in an oil well, resulting in an uncontrolled flow of about 7,000 barrels per day. Suman pioneered the use of a directional well drilled into the producing sand in order to flood the sand with water and with drilling mud to stop the uncontrolled flow. In the 1930s and early 1940s he was instrumental in Humble Oil's development into the American Southwest's leading petroleum producer. From 1945 until his retirement in 1955 he was a vice-president and member of the board of directors of Standard Oil Company of New Jersey. In 1941 he was the president of American Institute of Mining, Metallurgical, and Petroleum Engineers (AIME). In 1943 he was awarded AIME's Anthony F. Lucas Gold Medal. In 1958 he won the John Fritz Medal.

On December 16, 1912, he married Beatrice Mary Mowers (1888–1976). They had two sons, John Robert Suman Jr. (1916–2004) and Richard Harlan Suman (1917–1999). Both sons had careers in the petroleum industry.

== Selected publications ==
- John R. Suman (1921). Petroleum Production Methods. Gulf publishing Company.
- —— (1925). "The Sanding of Oil Wells". Transactions of the AIME. G-25 (1): 196–198. Bibcode:1925TAIME...G..196S. doi:10.2118/925196-G. ISSN 0081-1696.
- —— (1925). "The Saratoga Oil Field, Hardin County, Texas". AAPG Bulletin. 9 (2): 263–285.
- —— (1934). "The Well-Spacing Problem-Low Well Density Increases Ultimate Recovery". In: Drilling and Production Practice. American Petroleum Institute.
- —— (1955). "Oil Production - A Continuing Challenge". Journal of Petroleum Technology. 7 (12): 10–12. Bibcode:1955JPetT...7...10S. doi:10.2118/599-G. ISSN 0149-2136.
