= Donna Shirley =

American aerospace engineer (born 1941)

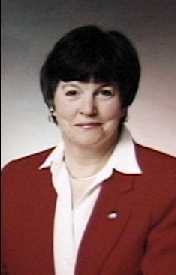
- Born: Donna Pivorotta; 1941 (age 83–84); Pauls Valley, OK
- Occupation(s): Aerospace and mechanical engineer, author
- Known for: Former manager of the Mars Exploration Program at NASA

Donna Lee Shirley (née Donna Lee Pivorotta; born 1941) is an American aerospace engineer, and former manager of Mars Exploration at the NASA Jet Propulsion Laboratory. She is the author of the book Managing Martians: The Extraordinary Story of a Woman's Lifelong Quest to Get to Mars—and of the Team Behind the Space Robot That Has Captured the Imagination of the World.

Asteroid 5649 Donnashirley was named in her honor.

== Early life ==
Shirley was born in Pauls Valley, Oklahoma and grew up in Wynnewood, Oklahoma. As a young girl, Shirley was actively involved with her Girl Scouts troop and played the oboe. Shirley was the only girl at her high school not to take home economics. Instead, Shirley took mechanical drawing. Her interest in Mars and space exploration began when she read The Sands of Mars by Arthur C. Clarke. She began taking flying lessons at age 15 and soloed at the Pauls Valley airport the next year. She earned a pilot's license at 16. During her senior year in high school, she was class vice president, band vice president, and valedictorian. After graduating from college, Shirley took up skiing and hiking in California.

=== Education ===
Donna Shirley enrolled in the University of Oklahoma as an engineering student, despite the fact that her advisor told her that, "... Girls can't be engineers." She also studied flying at the university, qualifying for pilot's licenses in single-engine land and sea, multi-engine land, commercial, and flight instructor. During Shirley's junior year at the University of Oklahoma, she became engaged and decided to change her degree to professional-writing in order to graduate faster. A short time later, Shirley and her fiancé split up. She went to work as a specification writer and an aerodynamicist for McDonnell Aircraft in Saint Louis, Missouri for about a year, eventually returning to OU to complete her aerospace/mechanical engineering degree. She graduated from University of Oklahoma with a BS in Aerospace and Mechanical Engineering in 1965, and from the University of Southern California with a MS in Aerospace Engineering.

== Career ==
She worked at the Jet Propulsion Lab (JPL) from 1966 to 1998. When she joined JPL, she was the only woman among the 2,000 engineers who had an engineering degree. At NASA, she worked on a variety of projects and programs. She was a member of the team that designed a heat shield for a space vehicle that was destined to enter Mars' atmosphere. She served as mission analyst and later program manager for the Mariner 10 mission to Venus and Mercury. She led a research team studying a Mars rover. She was Mars Exploration Program manager, and led teams for Mars Pathfinder and Sojourner rover. In 1997, she was inducted into the Women in Technology Hall of Fame, and in 1998 she was inducted into the Oklahoma Aviation and Space Hall of Fame. In 1998, she received the Golden Plate Award of the American Academy of Achievement. Shirley officially retired as manager of the Mars Exploration Program on August 21, 1998.

In 2000 she won the Washington Award and in 2003 was inducted in the Oklahoma Women's Hall of Fame. She was an associate dean of engineering for three years at the University of Oklahoma between 2000 and 2003. She then went on to be the founding director of the Science Fiction Museum in Seattle.

== Works ==
- Managing Creativity: A Practical Guide to Inventing, Developing and Producing Innovative Products. 1997.; E-book
- Managing Martians. Broadway Books. 1998. ISBN 9780767902403.; Random House Digital, Inc., 2010, ISBN 9780307756831
