= Clarence Floyd Hirshfeld =

American engineer

Clarence Floyd Hirshfeld (January 30, 1881 – April 19, 1939) was an American electrical, mechanical and consulting engineer, educator, chief of research for the Detroit Edison Co., now DTE Electric Company, author, and inventor, who was awarded the John Fritz Medal posthumously in 1940.

== Biography ==
=== Youth, education and early career ===
Hirshfeld was born in San Francisco in 1881, son of Charles Hirshfeld and Lotta (McCarthy) Hirshfeld. He obtained his BSc in electrical engineering at the University of California in 1902, and later his MA in mechanical engineering from Cornell University in 1905.

At Cornell University Hirshfeld had started his career in 1903 as instructor at its Sibley College of Mechanical Engineering and Mechanic Arts, now Cornell University College of Engineering. There he served until 1914 working his way up to assistant professor and eventually Professor of mechanical engineering. In those days he had also started his own consultancy practice.

=== Further career and acknowledgment ===
In 1913 Hirshfeld left Cornell University for the industry. He joined the Detroit Edison Company, now DTE Electric Company, where he was appointed chief of its research department. In World War I he took a leave of absence to serve at the United States Ordnance Department in the rank of Major and Lieutenant Colonel.

Afterwards Hirshfeld continued to run his Detroit Edison Company's research department. He directed researches in a wide variety of fields including "problems dealing with the design, construction, operation and maintenance of steam-electric power plants and the operation and interconnection of the electrical system; industrial electric heating and other load-building efforts; disposal of industrial waste; electric cable deterioration: electric welding; development of electric furnaces, and new methods of developing electrical energy."

From 1932 to 1939, in the last seven years of his life, he directed development of PCC streetcar as chief engineer. In his days these form of transportation was introduced in cities, such as Toronto, Brooklyn, Pittsburgh, Washington, Baltimore, Chicago, San Diego and Los Angeles.

In 1932 Hirshfeld obtained his Doctorate in Engineering at Rensselaer Polytechnic Institute. In 1940, he was posthumously awarded the John Fritz Medal.

== Selected publications ==
- Hirshfeld, Clarence Floyd, Engineering thermodynamics, New York, D. Van Nostrand company, 1910.
- Hirshfeld, Clarence Floyd and Tomlinson Carlile Ulbricht, Gas Paower. New York, Wiley, 1913.
- Hirshfeld, Clarence Floyd and Tomlinson Carlile Ulbricht, Steam power. New York, J. Wiley & sons, inc., 1916.
- Barnard, William Nichols, Frank Oakes Ellenwood, and Clarence Floyd Hirshfeld. Heat-power engineering. Volume 2. Wiley, 1935.

Articles, a selection

- Hirshfeld, Clarence Floyd; Berry, C. H. (1922-12-04). "Size Standardization by Preferred Numbers". Mechanical Engineering. 44 (12). New York, USA: The American Society of Mechanical Engineers: 791–.
- Hirshfeld, Clarence Floyd "Disturbing effects of horizontal acceleration." Electric Railway Presidents' Conference Committee, 1932.
- Hirshfeld, Clarence Floyd, and G. U. Moran. "Performance of Modern Steam-Generating Units." ASME Trans.(Fuels and Steam Power Section) 55 (1933): 117.

Patents, a selection

- Patent US1958577 - Apparatus for dust separation, 1934
- Patent US2010668 - Tire for rail vehicles, 1935
- Patent US2124350 - Wheel assembly, 1938
- Patent US1923147 - Electric cable and method of operating the same, 1933
- Patent US2207151 - Brake shoe, 1940
- Patent US2243068 - Braking system, 1941
