= Clyde N. Baker Jr. =

American geotechnical engineer (1930–2022)

Clyde Nelson Baker Jr.
- Born: May 6, 1930
- Died: August 26, 2022 (aged 92)
- Education: Massachusetts Institute of Technology; William & Mary
- Occupation: Geotechnical engineering
- Years active: 1954–2022
- Employer: GEI Consultants
- Known for: Advances in geotechnical engineering to enable the development of skyscrapers
- Awards: Member, National Academy of Engineering; ENR Award of Excellence; Washington Award

Clyde N. Baker Jr. (May 6, 1930 – August 26, 2022) was an American geotechnical engineer who received awards for his work to design advanced foundations supporting tall structures. He was elected a member of the National Academy of Engineering in 2004. In 2008, he received the Award of Excellence from Engineering News-Record (formerly the Man of the Year award).

== Personal life ==
Baker was born in Flushing, New York on May 6, 1930 to general surgeon Clyde N. Baker Sr and Muriel Esty Baker. As a young man, he earned a pilot's license by the age of sixteen and also suffered from rheumatoid arthritis. He and his wife Jeanette have three children, six grandchildren and five great-grandchildren. Baker met his wife Jeanette on a blind date in 1949 and they married in 1955. Baker became a Quaker in 1957 and his faith is seen as part of his even temperament as an engineer. Baker enjoys running and completed 40 marathons in his life, finishing his last at age 70.

Baker died on August 26, 2022, at the age of 92.

== Education ==
Baker graduated from Flushing High School and then earned a B.S. in physics from William & Mary. Baker describes himself as an accidental engineer. After earning the physics degree, he tried the field of electrical engineering by enrolling at the Massachusetts Institute of Technology (M.I.T.). His rheumatoid arthritis caused him to drop out for a semester, and he changed to civil engineering when re-enrolling. He went on to receive a B.S. and, in 1954, an M.S. in civil engineering from M.I.T. Baker credits his success, in part, to university teachers that include Donald Taylor, T.W. Lambe, and Harl P. Aldrich at M.I.T. and Karl von Terzaghi and Arthur Casagrande at Harvard University.

== Career ==
Upon graduation, Baker went to work for Soil Testing Service (later STS Consultantsand then AECOM). As of June 2, 2014, Baker works for GEI Consultants, Inc.

Baker played a significant role in increasing the foundation bearing capacity allowed by Chicago's building code by more than five thousand percent since the 1950s. When Baker started his career, the allowable load, or bearing capacity, was six tons per square foot (tsf). For the Chicago Spire, the bearing load was three hundred tsf.

Discuss tall buildings he has worked on.

Clyde Baker participated or served in professional societies including the American Concrete Institute, where he served as chairman, of ACI Committee 336 (Footings, Mats and Piers). He was a Member Emeritus of the Deep Foundations Committee of ASCE's Geo-Institute. His other professional affiliations include:

- ADSC: The International Association of Foundation Drilling
- Highway Research Board
- American Society for Testing and Materials
- Illinois Society of Professional Engineers
- American Society of Civil Engineers, Honorary Member
- M.I.T. Alumni Council
- Chicago Committee on High Rise Buildings
- National Society of Professional Engineers
- Council on Tall Buildings and Urban Habitat
- Structural Engineers Association of Illinois
- Deep Foundations Institute
- National Academy of Engineering

== Awards ==
In 1996, Baker was elected to Honorary Membership in American Society of Civil Engineers (ASCE) for "his longstanding commitment and innovative accomplishments in advancing the state of the civil engineering practice and his commitment to advancing the careers of all who interact with him." Baker was elected into the National Academy of Engineering in 2004 for "advancements in the engineering and construction of deep foundations for safe support of the world's tallest buildings.".

After being recognized as a top newsmaker of 2007, Baker received the ENR Award of Excellence "for firming up the science of soil to support the skyscrapers of tomorrow." As part of the award, Baker was the subject of an eight-page cover story in the April 7, 2008 issue of ENR. The award was received at a black-tie gala held at the New York Marriott Marquis on April 3, 2008.

OPAL Award Baker was awarded the Outstanding Projects and Leaders (OPAL) award in 2008 from the American Society of Civil Engineers for his lifetime accomplishments of innovation and excellence in civil engineering design. The award was presented at a black-tie gala in Arlington, Virginia on April 30, 2008.

Other awards won by Baker included:

- Terzaghi Lecture, 2009
- Washington Award, 2009
- Moles Award, 2006
- Chicago Building Congress Award of Honor, 2006
- ASCE Ralph B Peck Award, 2000
- ASCE, Honorary Member, 1996
- ASCE, Martin S. Kapp Award, 1995
- DFI, Distinguished Service Award, 1987
