= Jack Kilby =

American electrical engineer (1923–2005)

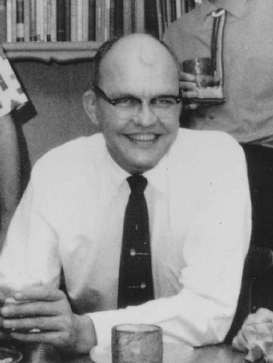
- Kilby, early 1960s
- Born: Jack St. Clair Kilby; November 8, 1923; Jefferson City, Missouri, U.S.
- Died: June 20, 2005 (aged 81); Dallas, Texas, U.S.
- Education: University of Illinois: B.S., Electrical Engineering; University of Wisconsin: M.S., Electrical Engineering
- Known for: Invention of the integrated circuit
- Spouse: Barbara Annegers (m. 1948)
- Children: 2
- Awards: Stuart Ballantine Medal (1966); IEEE David Sarnoff Award (1966); National Medal of Science (1969); IEEE Cledo Brunetti Award (1978); Holley Medal (1982, 1989); IEEE Medal of Honor (1986); Charles Stark Draper Prize (1989); National Medal of Technology (1990); ASME Thurston Lecture Award (1990); Computer Pioneer Award (1993); Kyoto Prize in Advanced Technology (1993); Washington Award (1999); Nobel Prize in Physics (2000); Harold Pender Award (2000)
- Scientific career
- Fields: Electrical engineering
- Workplaces: Texas Instruments

Jack St. Clair Kilby (November 8, 1923 – June 20, 2005) was an American electrical engineer who took part, along with Robert Noyce of Fairchild Semiconductor, in the realization of the first integrated circuit while working at Texas Instruments in 1958. For this invention, Kilby shared the 2000 Nobel Prize in Physics.

Kilby was also a co-inventor of the handheld calculator and the thermal printer, for which he had the patents. He also had patents for seven other inventions.

== Biography ==
Jack St. Clair Kilby was born on November 8, 1923, in Jefferson City, Missouri. He was raised in Great Bend, Kansas, where his father ran a small electric company that served customers in rural western Kansas. While in high school, a huge ice storm knocked down most of the poles that carried the telephone and electric power lines. His father's company had to use amateur radio operators for communication in the areas where customers had lost their power and phone service. This event sparked his interest in electronics.

After serving in the United States Army as an electronics technician during World War II, Kilby entered the University of Illinois, graduating in 1947 with a Bachelor of Science in Electrical Engineering. He then joined the Centralab Division of Globe Union Inc. in Milwaukee, Wisconsin, where he developed ceramic-base, silk-screen circuits for consumer electronic products. While working in Milwaukee, Kilby took evening classes at the University of Wisconsin, where he received a Master of Science in Electrical Engineering in 1950.

In 1952, Kilby visited Bell Telephone Laboratories to learn about the transistor, which was invented there in 1947. After returning to Centralab, he began working on germanium-based transistors for use in hearing aids. Due to needing the resources of a larger company to achieve miniaturization of circuits, he joined Texas Instruments (TI) in Dallas, Texas, in 1958.

In 1970, Kilby took a leave of absence from TI to work as an independent inventor. He explored, among other subjects, the use of silicon technology for generating electrical power from sunlight. From 1978 to 1984, he was Distinguished Professor of Electrical Engineering at Texas A&M University. Although he officially retired from TI in the 1980s, Kilby remained involved with the company until his death in 2005.

== Invention of the integrated circuit ==
Kilby's original integrated circuit, 1958.

Kilby was vital to the invention of the integrated circuit. In mid-1958, as a newly employed engineer at Texas Instruments (TI), he did not yet have the right to a summer vacation. Kilby spent the summer working on the problem in circuit design that was commonly called the "tyranny of numbers," and he finally came to the conclusion that the manufacturing of circuit components en masse in a single piece of semiconductor material could provide a solution. On September 12, he presented his findings to company's management, which included Mark Shepherd. He showed them a piece of germanium with an oscilloscope attached, pressed a switch, and the oscilloscope showed a continuous sine wave, proving that his integrated circuit worked, and thus that he had solved the problem. U.S. Patent 3,138,743 for "Miniaturized electronic circuits," the first integrated circuit, was filed on February 6, 1959. It was notable for having different components (transistors, diodes, resistors, capacitors, etc.) on one single substrate. Along with Robert Noyce (who independently made a similar circuit a few months later), Kilby is generally credited as co-inventor of the integrated circuit.

== Other work ==
Kilby went on to pioneer military, industrial, and commercial applications of microchip technology. He headed teams that created the first military system and the first computer incorporating integrated circuits. He invented the handheld electronic calculator (along with Jerry Merryman and James Van Tassel), showing a prototype called "Cal Tech" in 1967, which lead to the commercial Canon "Pocketronic" in 1971.

== Family ==
In 1948, Kilby married Barbara Annegers. They had two daughters, Ann and Janet.

== Death and legacy ==
Kilby died of cancer on June 20, 2005, in Dallas, Texas, at the age of 81.

On December 14, 2005, Texas Instruments created the Historic TI Archives. The Jack Kilby family donated his personal manuscripts and his personal photograph collection to Southern Methodist University (SMU). The collection will be cataloged and stored at DeGolyer Library, SMU.

In 2008, the SMU School of Engineering, with the DeGolyer Library and the Library of Congress, hosted a year-long celebration of the 50th anniversary of the birth of the digital age with Kilby's Nobel Prize-winning invention of the integrated circuit. Symposia and exhibits examined the many ways in which technology and engineers shaped the modern world. Kilby held an honorary doctorate of science from SMU and was a longtime associate of SMU through the Kilby Foundation.

== Recognition ==
=== Awards ===
Year	Organization	Award	Co-recipients	Citation	Ref.
1966	Franklin Institute	Stuart Ballantine Medal	Robert Noyce	"For the development of monolithic integrated circuits (microchips)."	
1966	Institute of Electrical and Electronics Engineers	IEEE David Sarnoff Award	—	"For his outstanding creative contribution in the field of monolithic integrated circuits, for his key inventions and for his team leadership in the application of integrated circuits to large scale systems."	
1969	National Science Foundation	National Medal of Science	—	"For original conceptions and valuable contributions in the production and application of integrated circuits."	
1970	American Academy of Achievement	Golden Plate Award	—	"Recipient of the Golden Plate Award as an exemplar of excellence in science and exploration."	
1978	Institute of Electrical and Electronics Engineers	IEEE Cledo Brunetti Award	Robert Noyce	"For contributions to miniaturization through inventions and the development of integrated circuits."	
1982	American Society of Mechanical Engineers	Holley Medal	—	—	
1986	Institute of Electrical and Electronics Engineers	IEEE Medal of Honor	—	"For fundamental contributions to semiconductor integrated circuit technology."	
1989	American Society of Mechanical Engineers	Holley Medal	Jerry Merryman and James H. Van Tassel	—	
1989	National Academy of Engineering	Charles Stark Draper Prize	Robert Noyce	"For their independent development of the monolithic integrated circuit."	
1990	American Society of Mechanical Engineers	Robert Henry Thurston Lecture Award	—	—	
1990	United States Patent and Trademark Office	National Medal of Technology	—	"For original conceptions and valuable contributions in the production and application of integrated circuits."	
1993	IEEE Computer Society	Computer Pioneer Award	—	"For co-inventing the integrated circuit."	
1993	Inamori Foundation	Kyoto Prize in Advanced Technology	—	"[For the] Creation of the Concept of the Monolithic Semiconductor Integrated Circuit and Its Demonstration."	
1999	Western Society of Engineers	Washington Award	—	"For his distinguished electronics career, including the invention of the monolithic integrated circuit which was the foundation for modern electrics."	
2000	Royal Swedish Academy of Sciences	Nobel Prize in Physics	Zhores Alferov and Herbert Kroemer	"For his part in the invention of the integrated circuit."	
2000	University of Pennsylvania	Harold Pender Award	—	"For his contribution to the invention of the integrated circuit, or microchip."	

=== Memberships ===
Year	Organization	Type	Ref.
1967	National Academy of Engineering	Member	
2001	American Philosophical Society	Member	

=== Honorary degrees ===
Year	University	Degree	Ref.
1988	University of Illinois Urbana-Champaign	—	
1990	University of Wisconsin–Madison	Doctor of Science	
1995	Southern Methodist University	Doctor of Science	
1996	Yale University	Doctor of Science	

== Commemoration ==
The Kilby Award Foundation was founded in 1980 in his honor, and the IEEE Jack S. Kilby Signal Processing Medal was created in 1995.

The Kilby Labs, TI's research laboratory for silicon manufacturing and integrated circuit design, is named after him.

The Jack Kilby Computer Centre at the Merchiston Campus of Edinburgh Napier University in Edinburgh is also named in his honor.

A statue of Jack Kilby stands in Texas Instruments Plaza on the campus of The University of Texas at Dallas.

Barton Community College in Great Bend, Kansas, holds an annual Jack Kilby STEM Day.

== See also ==
- Geoffrey Dummer

== References bibliography ==
- Berlin, Leslie The man behind the microchip: Robert Noyce and the invention of Silicon Valley Publisher Oxford University Press US, 2005 ISBN 0-19-516343-5
- Lécuyer, Christophe. Making Silicon Valley: Innovation and the Growth of High Tech, 1930-1970 Published by MIT Press, 2006.ISBN 0262122812
- Nobel lectures, World Scientific Publishing Co., Singapore, 2000.
