= Arthur E. Humphrey =

American chemical engineer (1927–2026)

- Born: November 9, 1927; Moscow, Idaho, U.S.
- Died: March 21, 2026 (aged 98); Scarborough, Maine, U.S.
- Education: University of Idaho; Massachusetts Institute of Technology; Columbia University
- Awards: John Fritz Medal (1997)
- Scientific career
- Fields: Chemical engineering
- Workplaces: Lehigh University

Arthur Earl Humphrey (November 9, 1927 – March 21, 2026) was an American chemical engineer.

== Life and career ==
Humphrey was born in Moscow, Idaho, on November 9, 1927. He attended the University of Idaho, the Massachusetts Institute of Technology and Columbia University (PhD 1953 in Chemical Engineering). Humphrey taught at the University of Pennsylvania, Lehigh University and Pennsylvania State University.

In 1973, he was elected a member of the National Academy of Engineering for contributions in biochemical engineering as researcher, author, and teacher. He received the John Fritz Medal in 1997.

He served as President of the American Institute of Chemical Engineers from 1990 to 1991. He was the Dean of Engineering and Applied Science from 1972 to 1980 at the University of Pennsylvania and Provost and Vice President of Lehigh University, serving from 1980 to 1986.

Humphrey died at his home in Scarborough, Maine, on March 21, 2026, at the age of 98.
