= J. Waldo Smith =

American civil engineer

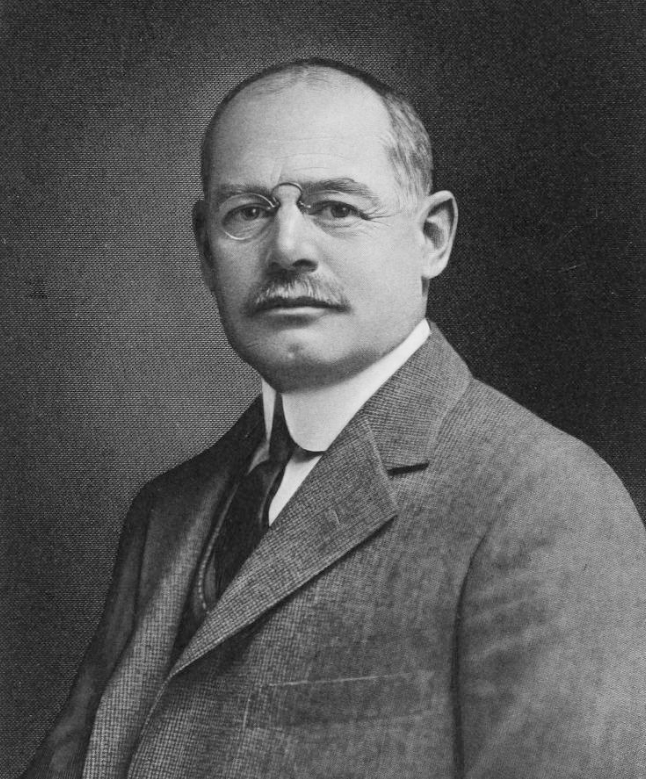
- Born: Jonas Waldo Smith; March 9, 1861; Lincoln, Massachusetts, U.S.
- Died: October 14, 1933 (aged 72); New York City, U.S.
- Education: Massachusetts Institute of Technology
- Engineering career
- Awards: John Fritz Medal (1918)

Jonas Waldo Smith (March 9, 1861 – October 14, 1933) was an American civil engineer and chief engineer on the Board of Water Supply of New York from 1905 to 1922. He was awarded the 1918 John Fritz Medal.

== Biography ==
=== Youth, education and early career ===
Waldo was born in Lincoln, Massachusetts as the youngest son of Francis Smith and Abigail Prescott (Baker) Smith. After attending the Phillips Academy, he studied civil engineering at the Massachusetts Institute of Technology (MIT), where he graduated in 1887.

Waldo had started his career as chief engineer of the water works of Lincoln, Massachusetts in 1868 at the age of 17. From 1881 he had been assistant in office of the civil engineering company Essex Company and Lawrence. During his studies at MIT he had been assistant in the Holyoke Water Power Company Essex Company in Lawrence in the summers, and after his graduation in 1887 he continued to work there for another three years.

=== Further career and recognitions ===
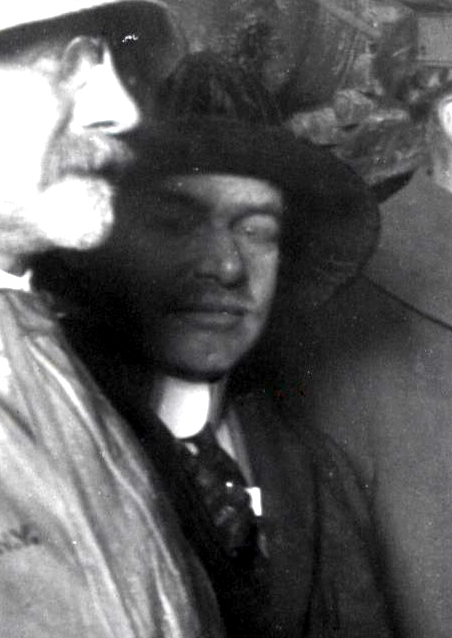
Chief Engineer J. Waldo Smith, 1912

In 1890 Waldo joined E. Jersey Water Company, where he became assistant of Clemens Herschel. In the first two years they designed the dams of the Pequannock watershed in the Pequannock River. Still with the company in 1892 he was put in charge of the Passaic Water Company, Paterson as Principal assistant engineer, and later served as engineer at the Montclair Water Company, and at the Acquackanonk Water Company until 1900.

In 1900 Waldo was appointed chief engineer at the E. Jersey Water Company. Here he directed the design and construction of a "mechanical filterstation plant at Little Falls, the largest and most modern plant of its kind in the United States at its completion."

From 1903 to 1905 he was chief engineer in the aqueduct commissioner of New York, where he assisted in the completion of the construction of the New Croton Dam. From 1905 to 1922 he served at the Board of Water Supply of New York as Chief engineer.

In 1918 Waldo was awarded the honorary Doctor of Engineering from the Stevens Institute of Technology. In the same year he also received the John Fritz Medal.

He died at his home in Manhattan on October 14, 1933.

== Publications ==
- Smith, J. Waldo. "The Catskill Water Supply System." Journal (American Water Works Association) 5.2 (1918): 91-99.
- Smith, J. Waldo, and W. W. Brush. "Repairs to Risers in the Shafts of the City Tunnel of the Catskill Aqueduct (with discussion)." Journal (American Water Works Association) 6.1 (1919): 46-53.
- Smith, J. Waldo. "Schoharie development of the Catskill Water Supply System for New York City." Journal (American Water Works Association) 6.4 (1919): 639-653.
