= Western Society of Engineers =

The Western Society of Engineers is a professional and educational organization founded in Chicago, Illinois, U.S., on May 25, 1869 as the Civil Engineers' Club of the Northwest. In 1880 the club was incorporated as the Western Society of Engineers. The organization is devoted to the development of engineering leaders and the advancement of the engineering profession.

Aviation pioneer Octave Chanute was president of the Society in its early history.
