= Viscosity models for mixtures =

Mathematical models for calculating viscosity

The shear viscosity (or "viscosity" for short) of a fluid is a material property that describes the friction between internal neighboring fluid surfaces (or "sheets") flowing with different fluid velocities. This friction is the effect of linear momentum exchange, caused by molecules with sufficient energy to move or "jump" between these fluid sheets due to fluctuations in their motion.

The viscosity is not a material constant, but a material property that depends on temperature, pressure, fluid mixture composition, and local velocity variations. This functional relationship is described by a mathematical viscosity model called a constitutive equation, which is usually far more complex than the defining equation of shear viscosity. One such complicating feature is the relation between the viscosity model for a pure fluid and the model for a fluid mixture which is called mixing rules. When scientists and engineers use new arguments or theories to develop a new viscosity model, instead of improving the reigning model, it may lead to the first model in a new class of models.

This article will display one or two representative models for different classes of viscosity models. These classes are:

- Elementary kinetic theory and simple empirical models - viscosity for dilute gas with nearly spherical molecules
- Power series - simplest approach after dilute gas
- Equation of state analogy between PVT and T$\eta$P
- Corresponding state model - scaling a variable with its value at the critical point
- Friction force theory - internal sliding surface analogy to a sliding box on an inclined surface
  - Multi- and one-parameter version of friction force theory
- Transition state analogy - molecular energy needed to squeeze into a vacancy analogous to molecules locking into each other in a chemical reaction
  - Free volume theory - molecular energy needed to jump into a vacant position in the neighboring surface
  - Significant structure theory - based on Eyring's concept of liquid as a blend of solid-like and gas-like behavior / features

Selected contributions from these development directions are displayed in the following sections. This means that some known contributions of research and development directions are not included. For example, the group contribution method applied to a shear viscosity model is not displayed. Even though it is an important method, it is thought to be a method for parameterization of a selected viscosity model, rather than a viscosity model in itself.

The microscopic or molecular origin of fluids means that transport coefficients like viscosity can be calculated by time correlations which are valid for both gases and liquids; however, these calculations are computer-intensive. Another approach utilises the Boltzmann equation, which describes the statistical behaviour of a thermodynamic system not in a state of equilibrium. It can be used to determine how physical quantities (such as heat energy and momentum) change when a fluid is in transport. This approach also involves computer-intensive simulations.

From Boltzmann's equation, one may also analytically derive analytical mathematical models for properties characteristic to fluids, such as viscosity, thermal conductivity, and electrical conductivity (by treating the charge carriers in a material as a gas). (See also the convection–diffusion equation.) The complexity of the mathematics for polar and non-spherical molecules makes it very difficult to get practical models for viscosity. The purely theoretical approach will therefore be left out in the rest of this article, except for some discussions related to dilute gas and significant structure theory.

== Use, definition and dependence ==
The classic Navier-Stokes equation is the balance equation for momentum density for an isotropic, compressional and viscous fluid. It is used in fluid mechanics in general and fluid dynamics in particular:

$$\rho \left[\frac{\partial \mathbf{u}}{\partial t} + \mathbf{u} \cdot \nabla \mathbf{u}\right] =
-\nabla P + \nabla[\zeta(\nabla\cdot \mathbf{u})]
+ \nabla\cdot\left[\eta\left(\nabla\mathbf{u} +  \left(\nabla\mathbf{u}\right)^T - \frac{2}{3} (\nabla\cdot\mathbf{u})\mathbf{I}\right) \right] + \rho \mathbf{g}$$

$\rho$ is the mass density, and $\mathbf{u}$ is the fluid velocity. On the right hand side is the divergence of the total stress tensor $\boldsymbol{\sigma}$, which consists of a pressure tensor $\left(-P\mathbf{I}\right)$ and a dissipative (or viscous or deviatoric) stress tensor $\boldsymbol{\tau}_{d}$. The dissipative stress consists of a compression stress tensor $\boldsymbol{\tau}_{c}$ (the 2nd term) and a shear stress tensor $\boldsymbol{\tau}_{s}$ (the 3rd term). The rightmost term $\rho \mathbf{g}$ is the gravitational force, which constitutes the body force contribution.

$$\boldsymbol{\sigma} = -P \mathbf{I} +\boldsymbol{\tau}_{d} = -P \mathbf{I} +\boldsymbol{\tau}_{c} +\boldsymbol{\tau}_{s}$$

For fluids, the spatial or Eularian form of the governing equations is preferred to the material or Lagrangian form, and the concept of velocity gradient is preferred to the equivalent concept of strain rate tensor. Stokes assumptions for a wide class of fluids therefore says that for an isotropic fluid, the compression and shear stresses are proportional to their velocity gradients, $\mathbf{C}$ and $\mathbf{S}_{0}$ respectively, and named this class of fluids for Newtonian fluids. The classic defining equation for volume viscosity $\zeta$ and shear viscosity $\eta$ are respectively:

$$\boldsymbol{\tau}_{c} = 3 \zeta \mathbf{C}$$

$$\boldsymbol{\tau}_{s} = 2 \eta \mathbf{S}_{0}$$

The classic compression velocity "gradient" is a diagonal tensor that describes a compressing (or expanding) flow or attenuating sound waves:

$$\mathbf{C} = \frac{1}{3} \left( \nabla\!\cdot\!\mathbf{u} \right) \mathbf{I}$$

The classic Cauchy shear velocity gradient is a symmetric and traceless tensor that describes a pure shear flow (where pure means "excluding normal outflow", which in mathematical terms means a traceless matrix) around, for example, a wing, propeller, ship hull, or in, for example, a river, pipe or vein with or without bends and boundary skin:

$$\mathbf{S}_{0} = \mathbf{S} - \frac{1}{3} \left( \nabla\!\cdot\!\mathbf{u} \right) \mathbf{I}$$

where the symmetric gradient matrix with non-zero trace is

$$\mathbf{S} = \frac{1}{2} \left[ \nabla \mathbf{u} + \left(  \nabla \mathbf{u} \right)^{\mathrm{T}} \right]$$

How much the volume viscosity contributes to the flow characteristics - for example, in a choked flow such as convergent-divergent nozzle or valve flow - is not well known, but the shear viscosity is by far the most utilized viscosity coefficient.

The volume viscosity will now be ignored, and the rest of this article will focus on the shear viscosity.

Another application of shear viscosity models is Darcy's law for multiphase flow.

$$\mathbf{u}_a = -\eta_a^{-1}  \mathbf{K}_{ra} \cdot \mathbf{K} \cdot \left( \nabla P_a - \rho_a \mathbf{g} \right)$$

where $a$ is water, oil or gas, and $\mathbf{K}$ and $\mathbf{K}_{ra}$ are absolute and relative permeability, respectively. These 3 vector equations model flow of water, oil, and natural gas in subsurface oil and gas reservoirs in porous rocks. Although the pressures changes are big, the fluid phases will flow slowly through the reservoir due to the flow restriction caused by the porous rock.

The above definition is based on a shear-driven fluid motion that, in its most general form, is modelled by a shear stress tensor and a velocity gradient tensor. However, the fluid dynamics of a shear flow is well-illustrated by the simple Couette flow. In this experimental layout, the shear stress $\boldsymbol{\tau}_{s}$ and the shear velocity gradient $\mathbf{S}_{0}$ (where now $\mathbf{S}_{0} = \mathbf{S}$) takes the simple form:

$$\tau = \eta S \quad \text{where} \quad \tau = \frac {F} {A} \quad \text{and} \quad S = {d u_{} \over dy} = {u_{max} \over y_{max} }$$

Inserting these simplifications gives a defining equation that can be used to interpret experimental measurements:

$$\frac {F} {A} = \eta {d u_{} \over dy} = \eta { u_{max} \over y_{max}}$$

where $A$ is the area of the moving plate and the stagnant plate, and $y$ is the spatial coordinate normal to the plates. In this experimental setup, value for the force $F$ is first selected, and then a maximum velocity $u_{max}$ is measured. Both values are then substituted into the equation to calculate viscosity, giving a single value for the viscosity of the selected fluid. If another value of the force is selected, another maximum velocity will be measured. This will result in another viscosity value if the fluid is a non-Newtonian fluid such as paint, but will give the same viscosity value for a Newtonian fluid such as water, petroleum oil or gas. If another parameter like temperature, $T$, is changed, and the experiment is repeated with the same force, a new value for viscosity will be calculated for both non-Newtonian and Newtonian fluids.

The majority of material properties vary as a function of temperature, including viscosity. The viscosity is also a function of pressure and, of course, the material itself. For a fluid mixture, this means that the shear viscosity will also vary according to the fluid composition. Mapping the viscosity as a function of all these variables requires a large sequence of experiments that generates an even larger set of numbers called measured data, observed data or observations. Prior to, or at the same time as, the experiment, a material property model (or short material model) is proposed to describe or explain the observations. This mathematical model is called the constitutive equation for shear viscosity. It is usually an explicit function that contains some empirical parameters that are adjusted in order to match the observations as accurately as the mathematical function is capable of.

For a Newtonian fluid, the constitutive equation for shear viscosity is generally a function of temperature, pressure and fluid composition:

$$\eta = f(T,P,\mathbf{w}) \quad \text{where} \quad \mathbf{w} =\mathbf{x}, \mathbf{y},\mathbf{z},1_{purefluid}$$

where $\mathbf{x}$ is the liquid phase composition with molfraction $x_{i}$ for fluid component $i$, and $\mathbf{y}$ and $\mathbf{z}$ are the gas phase and total fluid compositions, respectively.

For a non-Newtonian fluid (in the sense of a generalized Newtonian fluid), the constitutive equation for shear viscosity is also a function of the shear velocity gradient:

$$\eta = f(T,P,\mathbf{w},\mathbf{S}_{0}) \quad \text{where} \quad \mathbf{w} =\mathbf{x}, \mathbf{y},\mathbf{z},1_{purefluid}$$

The existence of the velocity gradient in the functional relationship for non-Newtonian fluids implies that viscosity is generally not an equation of state, so the term "constitutional equation" will generally be used for viscosity equations or functions. The free variables in the two equations above also indicate that specific constitutive equations for shear viscosity will differ from the simple defining equation for shear viscosity. The rest of this article will show that this is true. Non-Newtonian fluids will therefore be ignored for the rest of this article to focus on Newtonian fluids.

== Dilute gas limit and scaled variables ==
=== Elementary kinetic theory ===
In textbooks on elementary kinetic theory one can find results for dilute gas modeling that have widespread use. Derivation of the kinetic model for shear viscosity usually starts by considering a Couette flow where two parallel plates are separated by a gas layer. This non-equilibrium flow is superimposed on a Maxwell–Boltzmann equilibrium distribution of molecular motions.

Let $\sigma$ be the collision cross section of one molecule colliding with another. The number density $C$ is defined as the number of molecules per extensive volume $C = N/V$. The collision cross section per volume (or collision cross section density) is $C \sigma$, and it is related to the mean free path $l$ by:

$$l = \frac {1} {\sqrt{2} C \sigma}$$

Combining the kinetic equations for molecular motion with the defining equation of shear viscosity gives the equation for shear viscosity for dilute gases:

$$\eta_{0} = \frac {2} {3 \sqrt{\pi} } \cdot \frac {\sqrt{m k_{B}T}} {\sigma}
= \frac {2} {3 \sqrt{\pi} } \cdot \frac {\sqrt{MRT}} {\sigma N_{A}}$$

where

$$k_{B} \cdot N_{A} = R \quad \text{and} \quad M = m \cdot N_{A}$$

where $k_{B}$ is the Boltzmann constant, $N_{A}$ is the Avogadro constant, $R$ is the gas constant, $M$ is the molar mass and $m$ is the molecular mass. The equation above presupposes that the gas density is low (i.e. that the pressure is low), hence the subscript zero in the variable $\eta_{0}$. This implies that the kinetic translational energy dominates over rotational and vibrational molecule energies. The viscosity equation displayed above further presupposes that there is only one type of gas molecule, and that the gas molecules are perfect elastic hard core particles of spherical shape. This assumption of particles being like billiard balls with radius $r$ implies that the collision cross section of one molecule can be estimated by:

$$\sigma = \pi \left( 2 r_{} \right)^2 = \pi d^2 \qquad \qquad \qquad \,
\quad \text{for monomolecular gases and monoparticle beam experiments }$$

$$\sigma_{ij} = \pi \left( r_{i} + r_{j} \right)^2 = \frac{\pi}{4} \left( d_{i} + d_{j} \right)^2
\quad \text{for binary collision in gas mixtures and dissimilar bullet / target particles}$$

However, molecules in reality are not hard particles. For a reasonably spherical molecule, the interaction potential is closer to the Lennard-Jones potential, or even closer to the Morse potential. Both have a negative component that attracts the other molecule from distances much greater than the hard core radius, and thus models the Van der Waals forces. The positive component models the repulsive forces as the electron clouds of the two molecules overlap. The radius for zero interaction potential is therefore appropriate for estimating (or defining) the collision cross section in kinetic gas theory, and the r-parameter (conf. $r, r_{i}$) is therefore referred to as the kinetic radius. The d-parameter (where $d=2r, d_{i}=2r_{i}$) is called the kinetic diameter.

The macroscopic collision cross section $\sigma \cdot N_{A}$ is often associated with the critical molar volume $V_{c}$, and often without further proof or supporting arguments, by

$$\sigma N_{A} \propto V_{c}^{2/3} \quad \text{or} \quad \sigma N_{A} =
\frac {2} {3 \sqrt{\pi} } \cdot K_{rv}^{-1} V_{c}^{2/3}$$

where $K_{rv}$ is the molecular shape parameter that is taken as an empirical tuning parameter. The pure numerical part is included in order to make the final viscosity formula more suitable for practical use. Inserting this interpretation of $\sigma N_{A}$, and using reduced temperature $T_{r}$, gives

$$\eta_{0} = \sqrt{T_{r}} K_{rv} D_{rv} \quad \text{where} \quad T_{r} = T / T_{c} \quad \text{and}$$

$$D_{rv} =  \left( MRT_{c} \right)^{1/2} V_{c}^{-2/3} = R^{1/2} D_{v}$$

which implies that the empirical parameter $K_{rv}$ is dimensionless, and that $D_{rv}$ and $\eta_{0}$ have the same units. The parameter $D_{rv}$ is a scaling parameter that involves the gas constant $R$ and the critical molar volume $V_{c}$, and it used to scale the viscosity. In this article the viscosity scaling parameter will frequently be denoted by $D_{xyz}$, which involves one or more of the parameters $R$, $V_{c}$, $P_{c}$ in addition to critical temperature $T_{c}$ and molar mass $M$. Incomplete scaling parameters, such as the parameter $D_{v}$ above (where the gas constant $R$ is absorbed into the empirical constant) will often be encountered in practice. In this case, the viscosity equation becomes

$$\eta_{0} = \sqrt{T_{r}} K_{v} D_{v}$$

where the empirical parameter $K_{v}$ is not dimensionless, and a proposed viscosity model for dense fluid will not be dimensionless if $D_{v}$ is the common scaling factor. Notice that

$$\eta_{0} = \sqrt{T_{r}} K_{rv} D_{rv} = \sqrt{T_{r}} K_{v} D_{v} \implies K_{v} = R^{1/2}K_{rv}$$

Inserting the critical temperature in the equation for dilute viscosity gives:

$$\eta_{0c} = K_{rv} D_{rv} =  K_{v} D_{v}$$

The default values of the parameters $K_{rv}$ and $K_{v}$ should be fairly universal values, although $K_{v}$ depends on the unit system. However, the critical molar volume in the scaling parameters $D_{rv}$ and $D_{v}$ is not easily accessible from experimental measurements, and that is a significant disadvantage. The general equation of state for a real gas is usually written as

$$PV = ZRT \implies P_{c}V_{c} = Z_{c}RT_{c}$$

where the critical compressibility factor $Z_{c}$, which reflects the volumetric deviation of the real gases from the ideal gas, is also not easily accessible from laboratory experiments. Critical viscosity is also not readily available from experiments. However, critical pressure and critical temperature are more accessible from measurements.

Uyehara and Watson (1944) proposed to absorb a universal average value of $Z_{c}$ (and the gas constant $R$) into a default value of the tuning parameter $K_{p}$ as a practical solution to the difficulties of obtaining experimental values for $V_{c}$ and/or $Z_{c}$. The viscosity model for a dilute gas is then

$$\eta_{0} = \sqrt{T_{r}} K_{p} D_{p} \quad \text{where} \quad T_{r} = T / T_{c} \quad \text{and}$$

$$D_{p} = T_{c}^{-1/6} P_{c}^{2/3} M^{1/2}$$

By inserting the critical temperature in the formula above, the critical viscosity is calculated as

$$\eta_{0c} = K_{p} D_{p}$$

Based on an average critical compressibility factor of $\bar Z_{c} = 0.275$ and measured critical viscosity values of 60 different molecule types, Uyehara and Watson (1944) determined an average value of $K_{p}$ to be

$$\bar K_{p} = 7.7 \cdot 1.01325^{2/3}  \approx 7.77
\quad \text{for} \quad \left[ \eta_{0} \right] = \mu P
\quad \text{and} \quad \left[ P_{c} \right] = bar$$

The cubic equation of state (EOS) are very popular equations that are sufficiently accurate for most industrial computations both in vapor-liquid equilibrium and molar volume. Their weakest points are perhaps molar volume in the liquid region and in the critical region. Accepting the cubic EOS, the molar hard core volume $b$ can be calculated from the turning point constraint at the critical point. This gives

$$b = \Omega_{b} \frac{RT_{c}}{P_{c}} \quad \text{which is similar to} \quad
V_{c} = \bar Z_{c} \frac{RT_{c}}{P_{c}}$$

where $\Omega_{b}$ is a universal constant that is specific for the selected variant of the cubic EOS. This says that using $D_{p}$, and disregarding fluid component variations of $Z_{c}$, is in practice equivalent to saying that the macroscopic collision cross section is proportional to the hard core molar volume, rather than the critical molar volume.

In a fluid mixture like a petroleum gas or oil there are lots of molecule types, and within these mixtures there are families of molecule types (i.e. groups of fluid components). The simplest group is the n-alkanes, which are long chains of CH_{2}-elements. The more CH_{2}-elements, or carbon atoms, the longer molecule. Critical viscosity and critical thermodynamic properties of n-alkanes therefore show a trend, or functional behaviour, when plotted against molecular mass or number of carbon atoms in the molecule (i.e. carbon number). Parameters in equations for properties like viscosity usually also show such trend behaviour. This means that

$$\eta_{0cj} = K_{pj} D_{pj} \neq \bar K_{p} D_{pj} \quad \text{for many or most fluid components j }$$

This implies that the scaling parameter $D_{p}$ alone is not a true or complete scaling factor unless all fluid components have a fairly similar (and preferably spherical) shape.

The most important result of this kinetic derivation is perhaps not the viscosity formula, but the semi-empirical parameter $D_{p}$ that is used extensively throughout the industry and applied sciences as a scaling factor for shear viscosity. The literature often reports the reciprocal parameter and denotes it as $\xi$.

The contribution of the dilute gas viscosity to the total viscosity of a fluid will only be important when predicting the viscosity of vapors at low pressures or the viscosity of dense fluids at high temperatures. The viscosity model for dilute gas shown above is widely used throughout the industry and applied sciences. As a result, many researchers do not specify a dilute gas viscosity model when they propose a total viscosity model, and leave it to the user to select and include the dilute gas contribution. Some researchers do not include a separate dilute gas model term, and instead propose an overall gas viscosity model that applies to the entire pressure and temperature range they investigated.

In this section, the central macroscopic variables and parameters and their units are:

- temperature $T$ [K],
- pressure $P$ [bar],
- molar mass $M$ [g/mol], and
- low density (low pressure or dilute) gas viscosity $\eta_{0}$ [μP].

It is common in the industry to use another unit for liquid and high density gas viscosity $\eta$ [cP].

=== Kinetic theory ===
From Boltzmann's equation Chapman and Enskog derived a viscosity model for a dilute gas:

$$\eta_{0} \times 10^{6} = 2.6693 \frac {\sqrt{MT}} {\sigma^{2} \Omega \left( T^{*} \right)} \quad \text{where} \quad T^{*} = k_{B}T / \varepsilon$$

where $\varepsilon$ is the absolute value of the energy-depth of the potential well (see e.g. Lennard-Jones interaction potential). The term $\Omega ( T^{*} )$ is called the collision integral, and it occurs as a general function of temperature that the user must specify. This specification is difficult, which highlights an issue with the molecular or statistical approach: the analytical mathematics becomes incredibly complex for polar and non-spherical molecules, making it very difficult to achieve practical models for viscosity based on a statistical approach. The purely statistical approach will therefore be left out in the rest of this article.

=== Empirical correlation ===
Zéberg-Mikkelsen (2001) proposed empirical models for gas viscosity of fairly spherical molecules (see the section on Friction Force theory and its models for dilute gases and simple light gases). These empirical correlations illustrate that empirical methods compete with the statistical approach with respect to gas viscosity models for simple fluids (simple molecules).

=== Kinetic theory with empirical extension ===
The gas viscosity model of Chung et alios (1988) is a combination of the Chapman–Enskog kinetic theory (1964) of viscosity for dilute gases and the empirical expression of Neufeld et alios (1972) for the reduced collision integral, but expanded the empirical expression to be applicable to polyatomic, polar and hydrogen-bonding fluids over a wide temperature range. This viscosity model illustrates a successful combination of kinetic theory and empiricism, and it is displayed in the section of Significant structure theory and its model for the gas-like contribution to the total fluid viscosity.

=== Trend functions and scaling ===
In the section with models based on elementary kinetic theory, several variants of scaling the viscosity equation was discussed; these are displayed below for a fluid component $i$.

$$\eta_{0i} = \sqrt{T_{ri}} K_{rvi} D_{rvi} \quad \text{where} \quad
D_{rvi} = \sqrt{ M_{i} R T_{ci}} \cdot V_{ci}^{-2/3}$$

$$\eta_{0i} = \sqrt{T_{ri}} K_{vi} D_{vi} \ \ \, \quad \text{where} \quad
D_{vi} \ \ = \sqrt{ M_{i} T_{ci}} \cdot V_{ci}^{-2/3}$$

$$\eta_{0i} = \sqrt{T_{ri}} K_{pi} D_{pi} \ \ \, \quad \text{where} \quad
D_{pi} \ = M_{i}^{1/2}P_{ci}^{2/3} \cdot T_{ci}^{-1/6}$$

Zéberg-Mikkelsen (2001) proposed an empirical correlation for the $V_{ci}$ parameter for n-alkanes:

$$V _{ci}^{-1} = A + B \cdot \frac {P_{ci}}{RT_{ci}} \iff
V _{ci} = \frac {RT_{ci}}{ART_{ci} + BP_{ci}}$$

$$A = 0.000235751 \ mol/cm^{3} \quad \text{and} \quad B = 3.42770$$

The critical molar volume of component $i$, $V_{ci}$, is related to the critical mole density $\rho_{nci}$ and critical mole concentration $c_{ci}$ by the equation $V _{ci}^{-1} = \rho_{nci} = c_{ci}$. From the above equation for $V _{ci}^{-1}$ it follows that

$$Z _{ci} = \frac {P_{ci}}{ART_{ci} + BP_{ci}} \iff  \frac{Z_{ci}RT_{ci}}{P_{ci}V_{ci}} = 1$$

where $Z_{ci}$ is the compressibility factor for component $i$, which is often used as an alternative to $V_{ci}$. By establishing a trend function for the parameter $V_{ci}$ for a homologous series, group or family of molecules, parameter values for unknown fluid components in the homologous group can be found by interpolation and extrapolation, and parameter values can be easily re-generated. Use of trend functions for parameters of homologous groups of molecules have greatly enhanced the usefulness of viscosity equations (and thermodynamic EOSs) for fluid mixtures such as petroleum gas and oil.

Uyehara and Watson (1944) proposed a correlation for critical viscosity (for fluid component $i$) for n-alkanes using their average parameter $\bar K_{p}$ and the classical pressure dominated scaling parameter $D_{pi}$:

$$\eta_{ci} = \bar K_{p} D_{pi}$$

$$\ \ \bar K_{p} \, = 7.7 \cdot 1.01325^{2/3}  \approx 7.77
\quad \text{for} \quad \left[ \eta_{0} \right] = \mu P
\quad \text{and} \quad \left[ P_{c} \right] = bar$$

Zéberg-Mikkelsen (2001) proposed an empirical correlation for critical viscosity $\eta_{ci}$ parameter for n-alkanes:

$$\eta_{ci} = C \cdot P_{ci} M_{i}^{D}$$

$$\ C = 0.597556 \ \mu P /bar \cdot (g/mol)^{-D} \quad \text{and} \quad D = 0.601652$$

The unit equations for the two constitutive equations above by Zéberg-Mikkelsen (2001) are:

- $[P_{c}] = bar$
- $[V_{c}] = [RT_{c}/P_{c}] = cm^{3}/mol$
- $[T] = K$
- $[Z_{c}] = 1$
- $[\eta_{c}] = \mu P$

Inserting the critical temperature in the three viscosity equations from elementary kinetic theory gives three parameter equations.

$$\eta_{ci} = K_{rvi} D_{rvi} = K_{vi} D_{vi} = K_{pi} D_{pi} \quad \text{or} \quad$$

$$K_{rvi} = \frac {\eta_{ci}} {D_{rvi}} \quad \text{and} \quad
K_{vi} = \frac {\eta_{ci}} {D_{vi}} \quad \text{and} \quad
K_{pi} = \frac {\eta_{ci}} {D_{pi}}$$

The three viscosity equations now coalesce to a single viscosity equation

$$\eta_{0i} = \sqrt{T_{ri}} \eta_{ci} = \sqrt{T} \frac{\eta_{ci}}{\sqrt{T_{ci}}}$$

because a nondimensional scaling is used for the entire viscosity equation. The standard nondimensionality reasoning goes like this: Creating nondimensional variables (with subscript D) by scaling gives

$$\eta_{Di} = \frac{\eta_{0i}}{\eta_{ci}} \quad \text{and} \quad T_{Di} = \frac{T}{T_{ci}} = T_{ri} \implies
\eta_{Di} \eta_{ci} = \sqrt{T_{Di}} K_{pi}D_{pi}$$

Claiming nondimensionality gives

$$\frac{K_{pi}D_{pi}}{\eta_{ci}} = 1 \iff K_{pi} =\frac{\eta_{ci}}{D_{pi}} \implies \eta_{Di}= \sqrt{T_{Di}}$$

The collision cross section and the critical molar volume which are both difficult to access experimentally, are avoided or circumvented. On the other hand, the critical viscosity has appeared as a new parameter, and critical viscosity is just as difficult to access experimentally as the other two parameters. Fortunately, the best viscosity equations have become so accurate that they justify calculation in the critical point, especially if the equation is matched to surrounding experimental data points.

== Classic mixing rules ==
=== Classic mixing rules for gas ===
Wilke (1950) derived a mixing rule based on kinetic gas theory

$$\eta_{gmix} = \sum_{i=1}^{N} \frac{\eta_{gi}} {1 + \frac{1}{y_i} \sum_{j=1,j \ne i}^{N} y_{j} \varphi_{ij} }$$

$$\varphi_{ij} =  \frac{\left[ 1+ \sqrt[2]{\frac{\eta_{0i}}{\eta_{0j}}}\cdot\sqrt[4]{\frac{M_{j}}{M_{i}}} \right]^2}
{  \frac{4}{\sqrt[2]{2}} \sqrt[2]{ 1+ \frac{M_{i}}{M_{j}} }  }$$

The Wilke mixing rule is capable of describing the correct viscosity behavior of gas mixtures showing a nonlinear and non-monotonical behavior, or showing a characteristic bump shape, when the viscosity is plotted versus mass density at critical temperature, for mixtures containing molecules of very different sizes. Due to its complexity, it has not gained widespread use. Instead, the slightly simpler mixing rule proposed by Herning and Zipperer (1936), is found to be suitable for gases of hydrocarbon mixtures.

=== Classic mixing rules for liquid ===
The classic Arrhenius (1887). mixing rule for liquid mixtures is

$$\ln \eta_{lmix} = \sum_{i=1}^{N} x_{i} \ln \eta_{li}$$

where $\eta_{lmix}$ is the viscosity of the liquid mixture, $\eta_{li}$ is the viscosity (equation) for fluid component i when flowing as a pure fluid, and $x_{i}$ is the molfraction of component i in the liquid mixture.

The Grunberg-Nissan (1949) mixing rule extends the Arrhenius rule to

$$\ln \eta_{lmix} = \sum_{i=1}^{N} x_{i} \ln \eta_{li} + \sum_{i=1}^{N}\sum_{j=1}^{N} x_{i}x_{j}d_{ij}$$

where $d_{ij}$ are empiric binary interaction coefficients that are special for the Grunberg-Nissan theory. Binary interaction coefficients are widely used in cubic EOS where they often are used as tuning parameters, especially if component j is an uncertain component (i.e. have uncertain parameter values).

Katti-Chaudhri (1964) mixing rule is

$$\ln \left( \eta_{lmix} V_{lmix} \right) = \sum_{i=1}^{N} x_{i} \ln \left( \eta_{li} V_{li} \right)$$

where $V_{li}$ is the partial molar volume of component i, and $V_{lmix}$ is the molar volume of the liquid phase and comes from the vapor-liquid equilibrium (VLE) calculation or the EOS for single phase liquid.

A modification of the Katti-Chaudhri mixing rule is

$$\ln \left( \eta_{lmix} V \right) = \sum_{i=1}^{N} z_{i} \ln \left( \eta_{li} V_{li} \right) +
\frac {\Delta G^{E}} {RT}$$

$$\Delta G^{E} = \sum_{i=1}^{N}\sum_{j=1}^{N} z_{i}z_{j}E_{ij}$$

where $G^{E}$ is the excess activation energy of the viscous flow, and $E_{ij}$ is the energy that is characteristic of intermolecular interactions between component i and component j, and therefore is responsible for the excess energy of activation for viscous flow. This mixing rule is theoretically justified by Eyring's representation of the viscosity of a pure fluid according to Glasstone et alios (1941). The quantity $\eta_{li} V_{li}$ has been obtained from the time-correlation expression for shear viscosity by Zwanzig (1965).

== Power series ==
Very often one simply selects a known correlation for the dilute gas viscosity $\eta_{0}$, and subtracts this contribution from the total viscosity which is measured in the laboratory. This gives a residual viscosity term, often denoted $\Delta\eta$, which represents the contribution of the dense fluid, $\eta_{df}$.

$$\eta_{df} = \eta - \eta_{0} \quad \iff \quad \eta = \eta_{0} + \eta_{df}$$

The dense fluid viscosity is thus defined as the viscosity in excess of the dilute gas viscosity. This technique is often used in developing mathematical models for both purely empirical correlations and models with a theoretical support. The dilute gas viscosity contribution becomes important when the zero density limit (i.e. zero pressure limit) is approached. It is also very common to scale the dense fluid viscosity by the critical viscosity, or by an estimate of the critical viscosity, which is a characteristic point far into the dense fluid region. The simplest model of the dense fluid viscosity is a (truncated) power series of reduced mole density or pressure. Jossi et al. (1962) presented such a model based on reduced mole density, but its most widespread form is the version proposed by Lohrenz et al. (1964) which is displayed below.

$$\left[ \frac{\eta_{df}} {D_{p}} + 10^{-4} \right]^{1/4}  = LBC_{}$$

The LBC-function is then expanded in a (truncated) power series with empirical coefficients as displayed below.

$$LBC_{} = LBC_{} \left( \rho_{nr} \right)  = \sum_{i=1}^{5} a_{i} \rho_{nr}^{i-1}$$

The final viscosity equation is thus

$$\eta = \eta_{0} -10^{-4} D_{p} + D_{p} L_{}^{4}$$

$$\eta_{0} = \eta_{0} \left( T \right)$$

$$D_{p}  = T_{c}^{-1/6} P_{c}^{2/3} M_{n}^{1/2}$$

Local nomenclature list:

- $\rho_{n} \,$ : mole density [mol/cm^{3}]
- $\rho_{nr}$: reduced mole density [1]
- $M$ : molar mass [g/mol]
- $P_c$ : critical pressure [atm]
- $T \$ : temperature [K]
- $T_c$ : critical temperature [K]
- $V_c$ : critical molar volume [cm^{3}/mol]
- $\eta \ \$ : viscosity [cP]

=== Mixture ===
$$\eta_{mix} = \eta_{0mix} -10^{-4} D_{pmix} + D_{pmix} L_{mix}^{4}$$

$$LBC_{mix} = LBC_{mix} \left( c_{rmix} \right)  = \sum_{i=1}^{5} a_{i} c_{rmix}^{i-1}$$

$$D_{pmix}  = T_{cmix}^{-1/6} P_{cmix}^{2/3} M_{mix}^{1/2}$$

$$\eta_{0mix} = \eta_{0mix} \left( T \right)$$

The formula for $\eta_{0}$ that was chosen by LBC, is displayed in the section called Dilute gas contribution.

LBC constants
i	$a_i$
1	0.10230
2	0.023364
3	0.058533
4	−0.040758
5	0.0093324

=== Mixing rules ===
$$T_{cmix} = \sum_{i} z_{i} T_{ci}$$

$$M_{mix} = M_{n} = \sum_{i} z_{i} M_{i}$$

$$P_{cmix} = \sum_{i} z_{i} P_{ci}$$

$$\rho_{ncmix}^{-1} = V_{cmix} = \sum_{i} z_{i} V_{ci} + z_{C7+} \cdot  V_{cC7+} \quad i < C7+$$

The subscript C7+ refers to the collection of hydrocarbon molecules in a reservoir fluid with oil and/or gas that have 7 or more carbon atoms in the molecule. The critical volume of C7+ fraction has unit ft^{3}/lb mole, and it is calculated by

$$V_{cC7+} = 21.573 + 0.015122 \cdot M_{C7+} - 27.656 \cdot SG_{C7+} + 0.070615 \cdot M_{C7+} SG_{C7+}$$

where $SG_{C7+}$ is the specific gravity of the C7+ fraction.

$$T_{ci} \quad \text{for} \quad i \geq C7+  \quad \text{or} \quad T_{cC7+} \quad \text{is taken from EOS characterization}$$

$$M_{i} \quad \text{for} \quad i \geq C7+  \quad \text{or} \quad M_{C7+} \quad \text{is taken from EOS characterization}$$

$$P_{ci} \quad \text{for} \quad i \geq C7+  \quad \text{or} \quad P_{cC7+} \quad \text{is taken from EOS characterization}$$

The molar mass $M_{i}$ (or molecular mass) is normally not included in the EOS formula, but it usually enters the characterization of the EOS parameters.

=== EOS ===
From the equation of state the molar volume of the reservoir fluid (mixture) is calculated.

$$V_{mix} = V_{mix}(T,P) \quad \text{for 1 mole fluid}$$

The molar volume $V$ is converted to mole density $\rho_{n}$ (also called mole concentration and denoted $c$), and then scaled to be reduced mole density $\rho_{nr}$.

$$\rho_{nmix} = 1/V_{mix} \quad and \quad \rho_{ncmix} = 1/V_{cmix} \quad and \quad \rho_{nrmix} = V_{cmix}/V_{mix} = \rho_{nmix}/\rho_{ncmix}$$

=== Dilute gas contribution ===
The correlation for dilute gas viscosity of a mixture is taken from Herning and Zipperer (1936) and is

$$\eta_{0mix} \left( T \right) = \frac {\sum_{i} z_{i} \eta_{0i} \left( T_{ri} \right) M_{i}^{1/2}} {\sum_{j} z_{j} M_{j}^{1/2}} \quad i,j < C7+$$

The correlation for dilute gas viscosity of the individual components is taken from Stiel and Thodos (1961) and is

$$\eta_{0i} \left( T_{ri} \right) =
\begin{cases}
34 \times 10^{-5} \cdot D_{pi} T_{ri}^{0.94} & \text{if} \quad T_{ri} \leqslant 1.5 \\
17.78 \times 10^{-5} \cdot D_{pi} \left( 4.58 \cdot T_{ri} - 1.67 \right)^{5/8} & \text{if} \quad T_{ri} > 1.5
\end{cases}$$

where

$$D_{pi} = T_{ci}^{-1/6} P_{ci}^{2/3} M_{i}^{1/2} \quad i < C7+$$

$$T_{ri} = \frac {T}{T_{ci}} \quad i < C7+$$

== Corresponding state principle ==
The principle of corresponding states (CS principle or CSP) was first formulated by van der Waals, and it says that two fluids (subscript a and z) of a group (e.g. fluids of non-polar molecules) have approximately the same reduced molar volume (or reduced compressibility factor) when compared at the same reduced temperature and reduced pressure. In mathematical terms this is

$$\frac { V_{a} \left( P_{ra}, T_{ra} \right)} {V_{ca}} = \frac { V_{z} \left( P_{rz}, T_{rz} \right)} {V_{cz}} \iff V_{a} \left( P_{a}, T_{a} \right) = \frac {V_{ca}} {V_{cz}}
\cdot V_{z} \left( P_{z} = \frac {P_{a}P_{cz}}{P_{ca}},T_{z}=\frac{T_{a}T_{cz}}{T_{ca}} \right)$$

When the common CS principle above is applied to viscosity, it reads

$$\eta \left( P, T \right) = \frac {\eta_{c}} {\eta_{cz}}
\cdot \eta_{z} \left( P_{z},T_{z}\right) \approx \frac {K_{p}D_{p}} {K_{pz}D_{pz}} \cdot
\eta_{z} \left( P_{z},T_{z}\right)$$

Note that the CS principle was originally formulated for equilibrium states, but it is now applied on a transport property - viscosity, and this tells us that another CS formula may be needed for viscosity.

In order to increase the calculation speed for viscosity calculations based on CS theory, which is important in e.g. compositional reservoir simulations, while keeping the accuracy of the CS method, Pedersen et al. (1984, 1987, 1989) proposed a CS method that uses a simple (or conventional) CS formula when calculating the reduced mass density that is used in the rotational coupling constants (displayed in the sections below), and a more complex CS formula, involving the rotational coupling constants, elsewhere.

=== Mixture ===
The simple corresponding state principle is extended by including a rotational coupling coefficient $\alpha$ as suggested by Tham and Gubbins (1970). The reference fluid is methane, and it is given the subscript z.

$$\eta_{mix} \left( P,T \right) = \left( \frac {T_{cmix}} {T_{cz}} \right)^{-1/6} \cdot \left( \frac {P_{cmix}} {P_{cz}} \right)^{2/3} \cdot  \left( \frac {M_{mix}} {M_{z}} \right)^{1/2} \cdot \frac {\alpha_{cmix}} {\alpha_{cz}} \cdot \eta_{z} \left( P_{z},T_{z} \right)$$

$$P_{z} = \frac {P \cdot P_{cz} \alpha_{z}} {P_{cmix} \alpha_{mix}}$$

$$T_{z} = \frac {T \cdot T_{cz} \alpha_{z}} {T_{cmix} \alpha_{mix}}$$

=== Mixing rules ===
The interaction terms for critical temperature and critical volume are

$$T_{cij} = \left( T_{ci} T_{cj} \right)^{1/2}$$

$$V_{cij} = \frac {1}{8} \left( V_{ci}^{1/3} + V_{cj}^{1/3} \right)^{3}$$

The parameter $V_{ci}$ is usually uncertain or not available. One therefore wants to avoid this parameter. Replacing $Z_{ci}$ with the generic average parameter $\bar Z_{c}$ for all components, gives

$$V_{ci} = R Z_{ci} T_{ci} / P_{ci} = \bar R_{zc} T_{ci} / P_{ci} \quad \text{where} \quad  \bar R_{zc} = R \bar Z_{c}$$

$$V_{cij} = \frac {1}{8} R_{zc} \left( \left( \frac {T_{ci}} {P_{ci}} \right)^{1/3} + \left( \frac {T_{cj}} {P_{cj}} \right)^{1/3} \right)^{3}$$

$$T_{cmix} = \frac {\sum_{i} \sum_{j} z_{i} z_{j} V_{cij} T_{cij}}  {\sum_{i} \sum_{j} z_{i} z_{j} V_{cij}}$$

The above expression for $V_{cij}$ is now inserted into the equation for $T_{cmix}$. This gives the following mixing rule

$$T_{cmix} = \frac {\sum_{i} \sum_{j} z_{i} z_{j} \left( \left( \frac {T_{ci}} {P_{ci}} \right)^{1/3} + \left( \frac {T_{cj}} {P_{cj}} \right)^{1/3} \right)^{3} \left( T_{ci} T_{cj} \right)^{1/2}}
{\sum_{i} \sum_{j} z_{i} z_{j} \left( \left( \frac {T_{ci}} {P_{ci}} \right)^{1/3} + \left( \frac {T_{cj}} {P_{cj}} \right)^{1/3} \right)^{3}}$$

Mixing rule for the critical pressure of the mixture is established in a similar way.

$$P_{cmix} = R_{zc} T_{cmix} / V_{cmix}$$

$$V_{cmix} = \sum_{i} \sum_{j} z_{i} z_{j} V_{cij}$$

$$P_{cmix} = \frac {8 \sum_{i} \sum_{j} z_{i} z_{j} \left( \left( \frac {T_{ci}} {P_{ci}} \right)^{1/3} + \left( \frac {T_{cj}} {P_{cj}} \right)^{1/3} \right)^{3} \left( T_{ci} T_{cj} \right)^{1/2}}
{\left( \sum_{i} \sum_{j} z_{i} z_{j} \left( \left( \frac {T_{ci}} {P_{ci}} \right)^{1/3} + \left( \frac {T_{cj}} {P_{cj}} \right)^{1/3} \right)^{3} \right)^{2}}$$

The mixing rule for molecular weight is much simpler, but it is not entirely intuitive. It is an empirical combination of the more intuitive formulas with mass weighting $\overline{M}_{w}$ and mole weighting $\overline{M}_{n}$.

$$M_{mix} = 1.304 \times 10^{-4} \left( \overline{M}_{w}^{2.303} - \overline{M}_{n}^{2.303} \right) + \overline{M}_{n}$$

$$\overline{M}_{w} = \frac {\sum_{i} z_{i} M_{i}^{2}} {\sum_{j} z_{j} M_{j}}
\quad and \quad \overline{M}_{n} = \sum_{i} z_{i} M_{i}$$

The rotational coupling parameter for the mixture is

$$\alpha_{mix} = 1+7.378 \times 10^{-3} \rho_{rz \alpha}^{1.847} M_{mix}^{0.5173}$$

=== Reference fluid ===
The accuracy of the final viscosity of the CS method needs a very accurate density prediction of the reference fluid. The molar volume of the reference fluid methane is therefore calculated by a special EOS, and the Benedict-Webb-Rubin (1940) equation of state variant suggested by McCarty (1974), and abbreviated BWRM, is recommended by Pedersen et al. (1987) for this purpose. This means that the fluid mass density in a grid cell of the reservoir model may be calculated via e.g. a cubic EOS or by an input table with unknown establishment. In order to avoid iterative calculations, the reference (mass) density used in the rotational coupling parameters is therefore calculated using a simpler corresponding state principle which says that

$$P_{z \alpha} = \frac {P \cdot P_{cz}} {P_{cmix}}  \quad \text{and}
\quad T_{z \alpha} = \frac {T \cdot T_{cz}} {T_{cmix}} \quad \Rightarrow
\quad V_{z \alpha} = V(T_{z \alpha},P_{z \alpha}) \quad \text{for 1 mole methane}$$

The molar volume is used to calculate the mass concentration, which is called (mass) density, and then scaled to be reduced density which is equal to reciprocal of reduced molar volume because there is only on component (molecule type). In mathematical terms this is

$$\rho_{z \alpha} = M_{z}/V_{z \alpha} \quad and \quad \rho_{cz} = M_{z}/V_{cz} \quad \Rightarrow \quad \rho_{rz \alpha} = \rho_{z \alpha}/\rho_{cz} = V_{cz}/V_{z \alpha}$$

The formula for the rotational coupling parameter of the mixture is shown further up, and the rotational coupling parameter for the reference fluid (methane) is

$$\alpha_{z} = 1+0.031 \rho_{rz \alpha}^{1.847}$$

The methane mass density used in viscosity formulas is based on the extended corresponding state, shown at the beginning of this chapter on CS-methods. Using the BWRM EOS, the molar volume of the reference fluid is calculated as

$$V_{z} = V(T_{z},P_{z}) \quad \text{for 1 mole methane}$$

Once again, the molar volume is used to calculate the mass concentration, or mass density, but the reference fluid is a single component fluid, and the reduced density is independent of the relative molar mass. In mathematical terms this is

$$\rho_{z} = M_{z}/V_{z} \quad and \quad \rho_{cz} = M_{z}/V_{cz} \quad \Rightarrow \quad \rho_{rz} = \rho_{z}/\rho_{cz} = V_{cz}/V_{z}$$

The effect of a changing composition of e.g. the liquid phase is related to the scaling factors for viscosity, temperature and pressure, and that is the corresponding state principle.

The reference viscosity correlation of Pedersen et al. (1987) is

$$\eta_{z} \left( \rho_{z} , T_{z} \right) = \eta_{0}(T_{z}) + \hat{\eta}_{1}(T_{z}) \rho_{z} +  F_{1} \Delta \eta' (\rho_{z} , T_{z}) +  F_{2} \Delta \eta'' (\rho_{z} , T_{z})$$

The formulas for $\eta_{0}(T_{z})$, $\hat{\eta}_{1}(T_{z})$, $\Delta \eta' (\rho_{z} , T_{z})$ are taken from Hanley et al. (1975).

The dilute gas contribution is

$$\eta_{0} \left( T_{z} \right) = \textstyle \sum_{i=1}^{9} g_i T_{z}^{\frac{i-3}{4}}$$

The temperature dependent factor of the first density contribution is

$$\hat{\eta}_{1}\left( T_{z} \right) = h_1 - h_2 \left\lbrack h_3 - ln \left( \frac{T_{z}}{h_4}\right)\right\rbrack^2$$

The dense fluid term is

$$\Delta \eta' \left( \rho_{z} , T_{z} \right) = e^{j_1 + j_4 / T_{z}}   \times  \lbrack exp{\lbrack \rho_{z}^{0.1} ( j_2+j_3/T_{z}^{3/2} )  + \theta_{rz} \rho_{z}^{0.5} \left( j_5+j_6/T_{z}+j_7/T_{z}^2  \right) \rbrack } - 1 \rbrack$$

where exponential function is written both as $e^{x}$ and as $exp{ \lbrack x \rbrack }$. The molar volume of the reference fluid methane, which is used to calculate the mass density in the viscosity formulas above, is calculated at a reduced temperature that is proportional to the reduced temperature of the mixture. Due to the high critical temperatures of heavier hydrocarbon molecules, the reduced temperature of heavier reservoir oils (i.e. mixtures) can give a transferred reduced methane temperature that is in the neighborhood of the freezing temperature of methane. This is illustrated using two fairly heavy hydrocarbon molecules, in the table below. The selected temperatures are a typical oil or gas reservoir temperature, the reference temperature of the International Standard Metric Conditions for Natural Gas (and similar fluids) and the freezing temperature of methane ($T_{fz}$).

Transfer of reduced temperature
	Temp.	Temp.	n-decane	n-eicosane	methane	$T_{r \, c_{10}h_{22}}$	$T_{r \, c_{20}h_{42}}$
Temperature	deg C	K	$T_{r \, c_{10}h_{22}}$	$T_{r \, c_{20}h_{42}}$	$T_{r \, c_{1}h_{4}}$	$\rightarrow T_{r \, c_{1}h_{4}}$	$\rightarrow T_{r \, c_{1}h_{4}}$
$T_c \, \, (K)$			617.6	767	190.6		
reservoir	95	368.15	0.60	0.48	1.93	0.60	0.48
ISMC-NG	15	288.15	0.47	0.38	1.51	0.47	0.38
$T_{f \, c_{1}h_{4}}$	−182.45	90.7	0.15	0.12	0.48		

Pedersen et al. (1987) added a fourth term, that is correcting the reference viscosity formula at low reduced temperatures. The temperature functions $F_1$ and $F_2$ are weight factors. Their correction term is

$$\Delta \eta'' \left( \rho_{z} , T_{z} \right) = e^{k_1 + k_4 / T_{z}}   \times  \lbrack exp{\lbrack \rho_{z}^{0.1} ( k_2+k_3/T_{z}^{3/2} )  + \theta_{rz} \rho_{z}^{0.5} \left( k_5+k_6/T_{z}+k_7/T_{z}^2  \right) \rbrack } - 1 \rbrack$$

HCH and PF constants
i	$g_i$	$h_i$	$j_i$	$k_i$
1	−2.090975E5	1.696985927	−10.3506	−9.74602
2	2.647269E5	0.133372346	17.5716	18.0834
3	−1.472818E5	1.4	−3019.39	−4126.66
4	4.716740E4	168.0	188.730	44.6055
5	−9.481872E3		0.0429036	0.976544
6	1.219979E3		145.290	81.8134
7	−9.627993E1		6127.68	15649.9
8	4.274152E0			
9	−8.141531E-2			

$$\theta_{rz} = \left( \rho_{z} - \rho_ {cz} \right) / \rho_ {cz} = \rho_{rz} - 1$$

$$F_{1}  = \frac {HTAN+1}{2}$$

$$F_{2}  = \frac {1-HTAN}{2}$$

$$HTAN  = tanh \left( \Delta T_{z} \right) = \frac {e^{\left( \Delta T_{z} \right)} - e^{\left( -\Delta T_{z} \right)}}   {e^{\left( \Delta T_{z} \right)} + e^{\left( -\Delta T_{z} \right)}}$$

$$\Delta T_{z}  = T_{z} - T_{fz}$$

== Equation of state analogy ==
Phillips (1912) plotted temperature $T$ versus viscosity $\eta$ for different isobars for propane, and observed a similarity between these isobaric curves and the classic isothermal curves of the $PVT$ surface. Later, Little and Kennedy (1968) developed the first viscosity model based on analogy between $T \eta P$ and $PVT$ using van der Waals EOS. Van der Waals EOS was the first cubic EOS, but the cubic EOS has over the years been improved and now make up a widely used class of EOS. Therefore, Guo et al. (1997) developed two new analogy models for viscosity based on PR EOS (Peng and Robinson 1976) and PRPT EOS (Patel and Teja 1982) respectively. The following year T.-M. Guo (1998) modified the PR based viscosity model slightly, and it is this version that will be presented below as a representative of EOS analogy models for viscosity.

PR EOS is displayed on the next line.

$$P = \frac {RT}{V-b_{eos}} - \frac {a_{eos}} {V(V+b_{eos})+b_{eos}(V-b_{eos})}$$

The viscosity equation of Guo (1998) is displayed on the next line.

$$T = \frac{rP} {\eta-d} - \frac {a} {\eta \left( \eta+b \right)+b \left( \eta-b \right) }$$

To prepare for the mixing rules, the viscosity equation is re-written for a single fluid component i.

$$T = \frac{r_{i} P} {\eta_{i}-d_{i}} - \frac {a_{i}} {\eta_{i} \left( \eta_{i}+b_{i} \right)+b_{i} \left( \eta_{i}-b_{i} \right) }$$

Details of how the composite elements of the equation are related to basic parameters and variables, is displayed below.

$$a_{i} = 0.45724 \frac {r_{ci}^{2} P_{ci}^{2} } {T_{ci}}$$

$$b_{i} = 0.07780 \frac {r_{ci} P_{ci} } {T_{ci}}$$

$$r_{i} = r_{ci} \tau_{i} \left(  T_{ri}, P_{ri} \right)$$

$$d_{i} = b_{i} \phi_{i} \left(  T_{ri}, P_{ri} \right)$$

$$r_{ci} = \frac {\eta_{ci} T_{ci}} {P_{ci} Z_{ci}}$$

$$\eta_{ci} = K_{p} D_{pi} \quad \text{where} \quad
K_{p} = 7.7\cdot 10^{4} \quad \text{and} \quad D_{pi} = T_{ci}^{-1/6} M_{i}^{1/2} P_{ci}^{2/3}$$

$$\tau_{i} = \tau_{i} \left( T_{ri}, P_{ri} \right) =
\left( 1 + Q_{1i} \left( \sqrt{T_{ri}P_{ri}} -1 \right) \right)^{-2}$$

$$\phi_{i} = \phi_{i} \left( T_{ri}, P_{ri} \right) =
\exp \left[ Q_{2i} \left( \sqrt{T_{ri}} -1 \right) \right] + Q_{3i} \left( \sqrt{P_{ri}} -1 \right)^{2}$$

$$Q_{1i} =
\begin{cases}
0.829599 + 0.350857 \, \omega_{i} - 0.747680 \, \omega_{i}^{2}, & \text{if } & \omega_{i} < 0.3  \\
0.956763 + 0.192829 \, \omega_{i} - 0.303189 \, \omega_{i}^{2}, & \text{if } & \omega_{i} \ge 0.3
\end{cases}$$

$$Q_{2i} =
\begin{cases}
\;\;\; 1.94546 \;\, - 3.19777 \, \omega_{i} + 2.80193 \, \omega_{i}^{2}, & \; \text{if } & \omega_{i} < 0.3  \\
-  0.258789 - 37.1071 \, \omega_{i} + 20.5510 \, \omega_{i}^{2}, & \; \text{if } & \omega_{i} \ge 0.3
\end{cases}$$

$$Q_{3i} =
\begin{cases}
0.299757 + 2.20855 \, \omega_{i} - 6.64959 \, \omega_{i}^{2}, & & \text{if } & \omega_{i} < 0.3  \\
5.16307 \;\; - 12.8207 \, \omega_{i} + 11.0109 \, \omega_{i}^{2}, & & \text{if } & \omega_{i} \ge 0.3
\end{cases}$$

=== Mixture ===
$$T = \frac{r_{mix}P} {\eta_{mix}-d_{mix}} -
\frac{a_{mix}} {\eta_{mix}\left(\eta_{mix}+b_{mix} \right)+b_{mix} \left( \eta_{mix}-b_{mix} \right) }$$

=== Mixing rules ===
$$a_{mix} = \sum_{i=1} z_{i}a_{i}$$

$$b_{mix} = \sum_{i=1} z_{i}b_{i}$$

$$d_{mix} = \sum_{i=1} \sum_{i=1} z_{i}z_{i}\sqrt{ d_{i}d_{i} } \left( 1- k_{ij} \right)$$

$$r_{mix} = \sum_{i=1} z_{i}r_{i}$$

== Friction force theory ==
=== Multi-parameter friction force theory ===
The multi-parameter version of the friction force theory (short FF theory and FF model), also called friction theory (short F-theory), was developed by Quiñones-Cisneros et al. (2000, 2001a, 2001b and Z 2001, 2004, 2006), and its basic elements, using some well known cubic EOSs, are displayed below.

It is a common modeling technique to accept a viscosity model for dilute gas ($\eta_{0}$), and then establish a model for the dense fluid viscosity $\eta_{df}$. The FF theory states that for a fluid under shear motion, the shear stress $\tau$ (i.e. the dragging force) acting between two moving layers can be separated into a term $\tau_{0}$ caused by dilute gas collisions, and a term $\tau_{df}$ caused by friction in the dense fluid.

$$\eta_{} = \eta_{0} + \eta_{df}
\quad \text{and} \quad \tau_{} = \tau_{0} + \tau_{df}$$

The dilute gas viscosity (i.e. the limiting viscosity behavior as the pressure, normal stress, goes to zero) and the dense fluid viscosity (the residual viscosity) can be calculated by

$$\tau_{0} = \eta_{0}  \frac{du}{dy} \quad \text{and} \quad \tau_{df} = \eta_{df}  \frac{du}{dy}$$

where du/dy $du/dy$ is the local velocity gradient orthogonal to the direction of flow. Thus

$$\eta_{0} = \frac{\tau_{0}}{du/dy} \quad \text{and} \quad \eta_{df} = \frac{\tau_{df}}{du/dy}$$

The basic idea of QZS (2000) is that internal surfaces in a Couette flow acts like (or is analogue to) mechanical slabs with friction forces acting on each surface as they slide past each other. According to the Amontons-Coulomb friction law in classical mechanics, the ratio between the kinetic friction force $F$ and the normal force $N$ is given by

$$\zeta  = \frac{F}{N} = \frac{A\tau_{df}}{A\sigma} = \frac{\tau_{df}}{\sigma}$$

where $\zeta$ is known as the kinetic friction coefficient, A is the area of the internal flow surface, $\tau$ is the shear stress and $\sigma$ is the normal stress (or pressure $P$) between neighboring layers in the Couette flow.

$$\eta_{df} = \frac{\tau_{df}}{du/dy} = \frac{\zeta\sigma}{du/dy}$$

The FF theory of QZS says that when a fluid is brought to have shear motion, the attractive and repulsive intermolecular forces will contribute to amplify or diminish the mechanical properties of the fluid. The friction shear stress term $\tau_{df}$ of the dense fluid can therefore be considered to consist of an attractive friction shear contribution $\tau_{dfatt}$ and a repulsive friction shear contribution $\tau_{dfrep}$. Inserting this gives us

$$\eta_{df} = \frac{\tau_{dfrep}+\tau_{dfatt}}{du/dy} = \frac{\zeta P}{du/dy}$$

The well known cubic equation of states (SRK, PR and PRSV EOS), can be written in a general form as

$$P = \frac {RT}{V-b} - \frac{a}{V^2+ubV+wb^2}$$

The parameter pair (u,w)=(1,0) gives the SRK EOS, and (u,w)=(2,-1) gives both the PR EOS and the PRSV EOS because they differ only in the temperature and composition dependent parameter / function a. Input variables are, in our case, pressure (P), temperature (T) and for mixtures also fluid composition which can be single phase (or total) composition $\mathbf{z} = \left[z_{1}, \cdots , z_{N}\right]$, vapor (gas) composition $\mathbf{y} = \left[y_{1}, \cdots , y_{N}\right]$ or liquid (in our example oil) composition $\mathbf{x} = \left[x_{1}, \cdots , x_{N}\right]$. Output is the molar volume of the phase (V). Since the cubic EOS is not perfect, the molar volume is more uncertain than the pressure and temperature values.

The EOS consists of two parts that are related to van der Waals forces, or interactions, that originates in the static electric fields of the colliding parts /spots of the two (or more) colliding molecules. The repulsive part of the EOS is usually modeled as a hard core behavior of molecules, hence the symbol (P_{h}), and the attractive part (P_{a}) is based on the attractive interaction between molecules (conf. van der Waals force). The EOS can therefore be written as

$$P = P_{h} - P_{a}$$

Assume that the molar volume (V) is known from EOS calculations, and prior vapor-liquid equilibrium (VLE) calculations for mixtures. Then the two functions $P_{h}$ and $P_{a}$ can be utilized, and these functions are expected to be a more accurate and robust than the molar volume (V) itself. These functions are

$$P_{h} = P_{h} (V,T,\mathbf{w} ) = \frac {RT}{V-b} \quad \text{where} \quad \mathbf{w} = \mathbf{x},\mathbf{y}, \mathbf{z}, 1_{pure fluid}$$

$$P_{a} = P_{a} (V,T,\mathbf{w} ) = \frac{a}{V^2+ubV+wb^2} \quad \text{where} \quad \mathbf{w} = \mathbf{x},\mathbf{y}, \mathbf{z}, 1_{pure fluid}$$

The friction theory therefore assumes that the residual attractive stress $\tau_{fatt}$ and the residual repulsive stress $\tau_{frep}$ are functions of the attractive pressure term $P_{a}$ and the repulsive pressure term $P_{h}$, respectively.

$$\tau_{dfatt} = F(T,P_{a},\mathbf{w}) \quad \text{and} \quad \tau_{dfrep} = F(T,P_{h},\mathbf{w}) \quad \text{and} \quad \mathbf{w} = \mathbf{x},\mathbf{y}, \mathbf{z}, 1_{pure fluid}$$

The first attempt is, of course, to try a linear function in the pressure terms / functions.

$$\eta_{df} = K_{a} P_{a} + K_{h} P_{h}$$

All $K$ coefficients are in general functions of temperature and composition, and they are called friction functions. In order to achieve high accuracy over a wide pressure and temperature ranges, it turned out that a second order term was needed even for non-polar molecules types such as hydrocarbon fluids in oil and gas reservoirs, in order to achieve a high accuracy at very high pressures. A test with a presumably difficult 3-component mixture of non-polar molecule types needed a third order power to achieve high accuracy at the most extreme super-critical pressures.

$$\eta = \eta_{0} + K_{a} P_{a} + K_{h} P_{h} + K_{h2} P_{h}^{2} + K_{h3} P_{h}^{3}$$

This article will concentrate on the second order version, but the third order term will be included whenever possible in order to show the total set of formulas. As an introduction to mixture notation, the above equation is repeated for component i in a mixture.

$$\eta_{i} = \eta_{0i} + K_{ai} P_{ai} + K_{hi} P_{hi} + K_{h2i} P_{hi}^{2} + K_{h3i} P_{hi}^{3}$$

The unit equations for the central variables in the multi-parameter FF-model is

$$[P_{c}] = bar \quad \text{and} \quad  [T] = K \quad \text{and} \quad [\eta] = \mu P$$

==== Friction functions ====
Friction functions for fluid component i in the 5 parameter model for pure n-alkane molecules are presented below.

$$K_{ai} = B_{a1i} \exp\left( \Gamma_{i} -1 \right) +
B_{a2i} \left[ \exp\left( 2 \Gamma_{i} - 2 \right) - 1 \right]$$

$$K_{hi} = B_{h1i} \exp\left( \Gamma_{i} -1 \right) +
B_{h2i} \left[ \exp\left( 2 \Gamma_{i} - 2 \right) - 1 \right]$$

$$K_{h2i} = B_{h22i} \left[ \exp\left( 2 \Gamma_{i} \right) - 1 \right]$$

$$\Gamma_{i} = T_{ci} / T$$

Friction functions for fluid component i in the 7- and 8-parameter models are presented below.

$$K_{ai} = B_{a0i} + B_{a1i} \left[ \exp\left( \Gamma_{i} -1 \right) - 1 \right] +
B_{a2i} \left[ \exp\left( 2 \Gamma_{i} - 2 \right) - 1 \right]$$

$$K_{hi} = B_{h0i} + B_{h1i} \left[ \exp\left( \Gamma_{i} -1 \right) - 1 \right] +
B_{h2i} \left[ \exp\left( 2 \Gamma_{i} - 2 \right) - 1 \right]$$

$$K_{h2i} = B_{h22i} \left[ \exp\left( 2 \Gamma_{i} \right) - 1 \right]$$

$$K_{h3i} = B_{h32i} \left[ \exp \left( 2 \Gamma_{i} \right) - 1 \right] \left( \Gamma_{i} - 1 \right)^{3}$$

$$\Gamma_{i} = T_{ci} / T$$

The empirical constants in the friction functions are called friction constants. Friction constants for some n-alkanes in the 5 parameter model using SRK and PRSV EOS (and thus PR EOS) is presented in tables below. Friction constants for some n-alkanes in the 7 parameter model using PRSV EOS are also presented in a table below. The constant $d_{2}$ for three fluid components are presented below in the last table of this table-series.

==== Mixture ====
$$P_{dyn} = P = \frac {RT}{V_{eos}-b_{eos}} - \frac{a_{eos}}{V_{eos}^2+ub_{eos}V_{eos}+wb_{eos}^2}$$

In the single phase regions, the mole volume of the fluid mixture is determined by the input variables are pressure (P), temperature (T) and (total) fluid composition $\mathbf{z}$. In the two-phase gas-liquid region a vapor-liquid equilibrium (VLE) calculation splits the fluid into a vapor (gas) phase with composition $\mathbf{y}$ and phase mixture molfraction n_{g} and a liquid phase (in our example oil) with composition $\mathbf{x}$ and phase mixture molfraction n_{o}. For liquid phase, vapor phase and single phase fluid the relation to VLE and EOS variables are

$$P_{hmix} = P_{heos} \left( V_{eos},T, \mathbf{w} \right) = \frac {RT}{V_{eos}-b_{eos}}
\quad \text{where} \quad \mathbf{w} =\mathbf{x}, \mathbf{y},\mathbf{z}$$

$$P_{amix} = P_{aeos} \left( V_{eos},T, \mathbf{w} \right) = \frac{a_{eos}}{V_{eos}^2+ub_{eos}V_{eos}+wb_{eos}^2}
\quad \text{where} \quad \mathbf{w} =\mathbf{x}, \mathbf{y},\mathbf{z}$$

In a compositional reservoir simulator the pressure is calculated dynamically for each grid cell and each timestep. This gives dynamic pressures for vapor and liquid (oil) or single phase fluid. Assuming zero capillary pressure between hydrocarbon liquid (oil) and gas, the simulator software code will give a single dynamic pressure $P_{dyn}$ which applies to both the vapor mixture and the liquid (oil) mixture. In this case the reservoir simulator software code may use

$$P_{amix} = P_{hmix} - P_{dyn} \quad \text{and} \quad P_{hmix} = P_{heos} (V_{eos},T,\mathbf{w}) = \frac {RT}{V_{eos}-b_{eos}} \quad \text{where} \quad \mathbf{w} =\mathbf{x}, \mathbf{y},\mathbf{z}$$

or

$$P_{hmix} = P_{dyn} + P_{amix} \quad \text{and} \quad P_{amix} = P_{aeos} (V_{eos},T,\mathbf{w}) = \frac{a_{eos}}{V_{eos}^2+ub_{eos}V_{eos}+wb_{eos}^2} \quad \text{where} \quad \mathbf{w} =\mathbf{x}, \mathbf{y},\mathbf{z}$$

The friction model for viscosity of a mixture is

$$\eta_{mix} = \eta_{0mix} + \eta_{dfmix}$$

$$\eta_{mix} = \eta_{0mix} + K_{amix} P_{amix} +K_{hmix} P_{hmix} +
K_{h2mix} P_{hmix}^{2} + K_{h3mix} P_{hmix}^{3}$$

The cubic power term is only needed when molecules with a fairly rigid 2-D structure are included in the mixture, or the user requires a very high accuracy at exemely high pressures. The standard model includes only linear and quadratic terms in the pressure functions.

==== Mixing rules ====
$$\ln \left( \eta_{0mix} \right) = \sum_{i=1}^{N} z_{i} \ln ( \eta_{0i} ) \quad \text{or} \quad \eta_{0mix} = \prod_{i=1}^{N} \eta_{0i}^{z_{i}}$$

$$K_{qmix} = \sum_{i=1}^{N} W_{i} K_{qi} \quad \text{where} \quad q = a,h,h2$$

$$\ln \left( K_{h3mix} \right) = \sum_{i=1}^{N} z_{i} \ln \left( K_{h3i} \right) \quad \text{or} \quad K_{h3mix} = \prod_{i=1}^{N} K_{h3i}^{z_{i}}$$

where the empirical weight fraction is

$$W_{i} = \frac {z_{i}} {M_{i}^{\varepsilon} \cdot MM} \quad \text{where} \quad
MM = \sum_{j=1}^{N} \frac {z_{j}} {M_{j}^{\varepsilon} }$$

The recommended values for $\varepsilon$ are

- $\quad \varepsilon = 0.15 \quad \;\;$ gave best performance for SRK EOS
- $\quad \varepsilon = 0.075 \quad$ gave best performance for PRSV EOS

These values are established from binary mixtures of n-alkanes using a 5-parameter viscosity model, and they seems to be used for 7- and 8-parameter models also. The motivation for this weight parameter $W_{i}$, and thus the $\varepsilon$-parameter, is that in asymmetric mixtures like CH_{4} - C_{10}H_{12}, the lightest component tends to decrease the viscosity of the mixture more than linearly when plotted versus molfraction of the light component (or the heavy component).

The friction coefficients of some selected fluid components is presented in the tables below for the 5,7 and 8-parameter models. For convenience are critical viscosities also included in the tables.

FF5 for n-alkanes using SRK EOS
	Name	$B_{h1}$	$B_{h2}$	$B_{a1}$	$B_{a2}$	$B_{h22}$	$\eta_{c}$
Formula		μP/bar	μP/bar	μP/bar	μP/bar	μP/bar^{2}	μP
CH_{4}	Methane	0.0954878	−0.0983074	−0.424734	0.0598492	1.34730E-5	152.930
C_{2}H_{6}	Ethane	0.0404072	−0.241910	−0.745442	0.0144118	1.53201E-5	217.562
C_{3}H_{8}	Propane	0.322169	−0.104459	−0.692914	0.0515112	1.08144E-5	249.734
C_{4}H_{10}	n-Butane	0.554315	−0.0334891	−0.577284	0.066969	1.03272E-5	257.682
C_{5}H_{12}	n-Pentane	0.556934	−0.143105	−0.825295	0.0812198	1.67262E-5	258.651
C_{6}H_{14}	n-Hexane	0.529445	−0.262603	−1.00295	−0.00765227	2.76425E-5	257.841
C_{7}H_{16}	n-Heptane	0.656480	−0.0643520	−0.964719	0.0485736	2.33140E-5	254.303
C_{8}H_{18}	n-Octane	0.503808	−0.114929	−1.29910	0.0479385	3.88652E-5	256.174
C_{9}H_{20}	n-Nonane	0.599863	−0.0625962	−1.40430	0.0220808	4.08108E-5	
C_{10}H_{22}	n-Decane	0.396401	−0.345116	−1.73836	−0.178929	6.85603E-5	257.928

FF5 for n-alkanes using PRSV EOS
	Name	$B_{h1}$	$B_{h2}$	$B_{a1}$	$B_{a2}$	$B_{h22}$	$\eta_{c}$
Formula		$\mu P / bar$	$\mu P / bar$	$\mu P / bar$	$\mu P / bar$	$\mu P / bar^{2}$	$\mu P$
CH_{4}	Methane	0.0978603	−0.0947431	−0.347478	0.060992	1.09269E-5	152.930
C_{2}H_{6}	Ethane	0.126032	−0.180542	−0.54886	0.033303	9.64845E-6	217.562
C_{3}H_{8}	Propane	0.245709	−0.164913	−0.630638	0.0339251	1.13654E-5	249.734
C_{4}H_{10}	n-Butane	0.478611	−0.0819001	−0.495743	0.0652985	1.07941E-5	257.682
C_{5}H_{12}	n-Pentane	0.439938	−0.232544	−0.753537	0.0584165	1.82595E-5	258.651
C_{6}H_{14}	n-Hexane	0.426605	−0.335750	−0.895709	−0.00664088	2.69972E-5	257.841
C_{7}H_{16}	n-Heptane	0.561799	−0.137427	−0.834083	0.0613722	2.33423E-5	254.303
C_{8}H_{18}	n-Octane	0.406290	−0.258599	−1.14826	0.0283937	3.88084E-5	256.174
C_{9}H_{20}	n-Nonane	0.484008	−0.256690	−1.24586	−0.00934743	4.30254E-5	
C_{10}H_{22}	n-Decane	0.244111	−0.760327	−1.63800	−0.311341	7.4966710E-5	257.928

FF7 for n-alkanes using PRSV EOS
	Name	$B_{h0}$	$B_{h1}$	$B_{h2}$	$B_{a0}$	$B_{a1}$	$B_{a2}$	$B_{h22}$	$\eta_{c}$
Formula		μP/bar	μP/bar	μP/bar	μP/bar	μP/bar	μP/bar	μP/bar^{2}	μP
CH_{4}	Methane	0.053816	−0.124174	0.028406	−0.430873	−0.369093	0.116296	9.71321E-6	152.930
C_{2}H_{6}	Ethane	0.210510	0.524279	−0.226923	−0.460617	−0.010559	−0.098116	6.97853E-6	217.562
C_{3}H_{8}	Propane	0.275468	0.773038	−0.191915	−0.612507	0.020985	−0.059749	8.98138E-6	249.734
C_{4}H_{10}	n-Butane	0.024164	0.859899	−0.828038	−0.952995	−0.327070	−0.382722	3.02572E-5	257.682
C_{5}H_{12}	n-Pentane	0.423099	0.519851	−0.059803	−0.765609	−0.343983	0.095436	1.50614E-5	258.651
C_{6}H_{14}	n-Hexane	0.375053	0.676194	−0.153389	−1.02588	−0.121181	−0.043562	2.04217E-5	257.841
C_{7}H_{16}	n-Heptane	0.486876	0.357007	−0.047235	−0.962702	−0.636737	0.035438	2.39889E-5	254.303
C_{8}H_{18}	n-Octane	0.528242	−0.272297	0.126597	−1.08722	−1.34905	0.209537	3.25271E-5	256.174
C_{9}H_{20}	n-Nonane								
C_{10}H_{22}	n-Decane	1.36796	−4.83660	1.35246	−0.899394	−4.82959	1.04980	4.49837E-5	257.928
C_{11}H_{24}	n-Undecane								
C_{12}H_{26}	n-Dodecane	7.14537	−18.9732	3.66800	4.49233	−18.8211	3.36729	7.81348E-5	245.148
C_{13}H_{28}	n-Tridecane	7.16560	−15.4258	3.37122	6.20650	−18.3811	3.35921	6.13474E-5	240.550
C_{14}H_{30}	n-Tetradecane	19.1819	−39.4083	7.32513	13.2010	−33.8698	5.86977	8.23832E-5	232.314
C_{15}H_{32}	n-Pentadecane	12.6811	−31.3240	5.94936	8.42368	−28.9591	5.08195	1.08073E-4	229.852
C_{16}H_{34}	n-Hexadecane	20.0877	−43.4274	7.11506	11.2682	−35.3317	5.55183	1.55344E-4	217.100
C_{17}H_{36}	n-Heptadecane								
C_{18}H_{38}	n-Octadecane	27.9413	−61.8540	12.9142	17.5532	−48.2830	9.13626	8.38258E-5	206.187

$B_{h32}$ using PR EOS
	Name	$B_{h32}$	$\eta_{c}$
Formula		μP/bar^{3}	μP
C_{11}H_{10}	1-Methylnaphthalene	1.05763E-9	340.458
C_{13}H_{28}	n-Tridecane	1.80168E-10	240.550
C_{16}H_{34}	2,2,4,4,6,8,8-Heptamethylnonane	2.14681E-7	580.515

.

=== One-parameter friction force theory ===
The one-parameter version of the friction force theory (FF1 theory and FF1 model) was developed by Quiñones-Cisneros et al. (2000, 2001a, 2001b and Z 2001, 2004), and its basic elements, using some well known cubic EOSs, are displayed below.

The first step is to define the reduced dense fluid (or frictional) viscosity for a pure (i.e. single component) fluid by dividing by the critical viscosity. The same goes for the dilute gas viscosity.

$$\eta_{dfr} = \frac {\eta_{df}}{\eta_{c}} \quad \text{and} \quad  \eta_{0r}= \frac {\eta_{0}}{\eta_{c}}$$

The second step is to replace the attractive and repulsive pressure functions by reduced pressure functions. This will of course, affect the friction functions also. New friction functions are therefore introduced. They are called reduced friction functions, and they are of a more universal nature. The reduced frictional viscosity is

$$\eta_{dfr} = K_{ar} \left( \frac {P_{a}}{P_{c}} \right) +
K_{hr} \left( \frac {P_{h}}{P_{c}} \right) +
K_{h2r} \left( \frac {P_{h}}{P_{c}} \right)^{2}$$

Returning to the unreduced frictional viscosity and rephrasinge the formula, gives

$$\eta_{df} = \frac{\eta_{c} K_{ar}}{P_{c}} P_{a} +
\frac{\eta_{c} K_{hr}}{P_{c}} P_{h} +
\frac{\eta_{c} K_{h2r}}{P_{c}^{2}} P_{h}^{2}$$

Critical viscosity is seldom measured and attempts to predict it by formulas are few. For a pure fluid, or component i in a fluid mixture, a formula from kinetic theory is often used to estimate critical viscosity.

$$\eta_{ci} =K_{vi} D_{vi} \quad \text{where} \quad   D_{vi} = M_{i}^{1/2}T_{ci}^{1/2}V_{ci}^{-2/3}$$

where $K_{vi}$ is a constant, and critical molar volume V_{ci} is assumed to be proportional to the collision cross section. The critical molar volume V_{ci} is significantly more uncertain than the parameters P_{ci} and T_{ci}. To get rid of V_{ci}, the critical compressibility factor Z_{ci} is often replaced by a universal average value. This gives

$$\eta_{ci} = K_{p} D_{pi} \quad \text{where} \quad   D_{pi} = M_{i}^{1/2}P_{ci}^{2/3}T_{ci}^{-1/6}$$

where $K_{p}$ is a constant. Based on an average critical compressibility factor of Z_{c} = 0.275 and measured critical viscosity values of 60 different molecule types, Uyehara and Watson (1944) determined an average value of K_{p} to be

$$K_{p} = 7.7 \cdot 1.01325^{2/3} \approx 7.77$$

Zéberg-Mikkelsen (2001) proposed an empirical correlation for V_{ci}, with parameters for n-alkanes, which is

$$V _{ci}^{-1} = A + B \cdot \frac {P_{ci}}{RT_{ci}} \iff
V _{ci} = \frac {RT_{ci}}{ART_{ci} + BP_{ci}}$$

where $V _{ci}^{-1} = \rho_{nci} = c_{ci}$. From the above equation and the definition of the compressibility factor it follows that

$$Z _{ci} = \frac {P_{ci}}{ART_{ci} + BP_{ci}} \iff  \frac{Z_{ci}RT_{ci}}{P_{ci}V_{ci}} = 1$$

Zéberg-Mikkelsen (2001) also proposed an empirical correlation for η_{ci}, with parameters for n-alkanes, which is

$$\eta_{ci} = C \cdot P_{ci} M_{i}^{D}$$

The unit equations for the two constitutive equations above by Zéberg-Mikkelsen (2001) are

$$[P_{c}] = bar \quad \text{and} \quad [V_{c}] = [RT_{c}/P_{c}] = cm^{3}/mol \quad \text{and} \quad  [T] = K
\quad \text{and} \quad [\eta_{c}] = \mu P$$

Constants for n-alkanes
symbol	value	unit
A	0.000235751	mol/cm^{3}
B	3.42770	1
C	0.597556	μP
D	0.601652	1

The next step is to split the formulas into formulas for well defined components (designated by subscript d) with respect critical viscosity and formulas for uncertain components (designated by subscript u) where critical viscosity is estimated using $D_{pi}$ and the universal constant $K_{p}$ which will be treated as a tuning parameter for the current mixture. The dense fluid viscosity (for fluid component i in a mixture) is then written as

$$\eta_{dfi} = \eta_{dfdi} + \eta_{dfui} = \eta_{dfdi} + K_{pu}F_{ui}$$

The formulas from friction theory is then related to well defined and uncertain fluid components. The result is

$$\eta_{dfdi} = \frac{\eta_{ci} K_{ari}}{P_{ci}} P_{ai} +
\frac{\eta_{ci} K_{hri}}{P_{ci}} P_{hi} +
\frac{\eta_{ci} K_{h2ri}}{P_{ci}^{2}} P_{hi}^{2} \quad \text{for} \quad i=1,\ldots,m$$

$$F_{ui} = \frac{D_{pi} K_{ari}}{P_{ci}} P_{ai} +
\frac{D_{pi} K_{hri}}{P_{ci}} P_{hi} +
\frac{D_{pi} K_{h2ri}}{P_{ci}^{2}} P_{hi}^{2} \quad \text{for} \quad i=m+1,\ldots,N$$

$$D_{pi} = M_{i}^{1/2} P_{ci}^{2/3}T_{ci}^{-1/6}$$

However, in order to obtain the characteristic critical viscosity of the heavy pseudocomponents, the following modification of the Uyehara and Watson (1944) expression for the critical viscosity can be used. The frictional (or residual) viscosity is then written as

$$\eta_{ci} = K_{p} D_{pi} \quad \text{where} \quad K_{p} = 7.9483$$

The unit equations are $\left[ \eta \right] = \left[ \eta_{c} \right] = \mu P$ and $\left[ P \right] = \left[ P_{c} \right] = bar$ and $\left[ T \right] = \left[ T_{c} \right] = K$.

==== Reduced friction functions ====
$$K_{qri} = B_{qrc} +B_{qr00} \left( \Gamma_{i} -1 \right) +
\sum_{m=1}^{2} \sum_{n=0}^{m} B_{qrmn} \psi_{i}^{n} \left[ \exp ( m \Gamma_{i} - m ) -1  \right]
\quad \text{where} \quad q=a,h$$

$$K_{h2ri} = B_{h2rc} + B_{h2r21} \psi_{i} \left[ \exp ( 2 \Gamma_{i} ) -1  \right]
\left( \Gamma_{i} - 1 \right)^{2}$$

$$\psi_{i} = \frac {R T_{ci}}{P_{ci}}
\quad \text{and} \quad  \Gamma_{i} = \frac {T_{ci}}{T}$$

The unit equation of $\psi_{i}$ is $\left[ \psi_{i} \right] = cm^{3}/mol$.

The 1-parameter model have been developed based on single component fluids in the series from methane to n-octadecane (C_{1}H_{4} to C_{18}H_{38}). The empirical parameters in the reduced friction functions above are treated as universal constants, and they are listed in the following table. For convenience are critical viscosities included in the tables for models with 5- and 7-parameters that was presented further up.

Universal constants in FF1
symbol	SRK	PR	PRSV
$B_{arc}$	−0.165302	−0.140464	−0.140464
$B_{hrc}$	0.00699574	0.0119902	0.0119902
$B_{h2rc}$	0.00126358	0.000855115	0.000855115
$B_{ar00}$	−0.114804	−0.0489197	0.0261033
$B_{ar10}$	0.246622	0.270572	0.194487
$B_{ar11}$	−1.15648E-4	−1.10473E-4	−1.00432E-4
$B_{ar20}$	−0.0394638	−0.0448111	−0.0401761
$B_{ar21}$	4.18863E-5	4.08972E-5	3.94113E-5
$B_{ar22}$	−5.91999E-9	−5.79765E-9	−5.91258E-9
$B_{hr00}$	−0.315903	−0.357875	−0.325026
$B_{hr10}$	0.566713	0.637572	0.586974
$B_{hr11}$	−1.00860E-4	−6.02128E-5	−3.70512E-5
$B_{hr20}$	−0.0729995	−0.079024	−0.0764774
$B_{hr21}$	5.17459E-5	3.72408E-5	3.38714E-5
$B_{hr22}$	−5.68708E-9	−5.65610E-9	−6.32233E-9
$B_{h2r21}$	1.35994E-8	1.37290E-8	1.43698E-8

.

==== Mixture ====
The mixture viscosity is given by

$$\eta_{mix} = \eta_{dmix} + \eta_{umix} = \eta_{dmix} + K_{pu}F_{umix}$$

The mixture viscosity of well defined components is given by

$$\eta_{dmix} = \eta_{0dmix} + K_{admix}P_{amix}  + K_{hdmix}P_{hmix} + K_{h2dmix}P_{hmix}^{2} + K_{h3dmix}P_{hmix}^{3}$$

The mixture viscosity function of uncertain components is given by

$$F_{umix} = \eta_{0umix} + K_{aumix}P_{amix}  + K_{humix}P_{hmix} + K_{h2umix}P_{hmix}^{2} + K_{h3umix}P_{hmix}^{3}$$

The mixture viscosity can be tuned to measured viscosity data by optimizing (regressing) the parameter $K_{pu}$.

where the mixture friction coefficients are obtained by eq(I.7.45) through eq(I.7.47) and $P_{a}$ and $P_{h}$ are the attractive and repulsive pressure term of the mixture.

==== Mixing rules ====
The mixing rules for the well defined components are

$$\ln \left( \eta_{0dmix} \right) = \sum_{i=1}^{m} z_{i} \ln ( \eta_{0i} ) \quad \text{or} \quad \eta_{0mix} = \prod_{i=1}^{m} \eta_{0i}^{z_{i}}$$

$$K_{qrdmix} =\sum_{i=1}^{m}W_{i} \frac{\eta_{ci}K_{qri}}{P_{ci}} \quad \text{where} \quad q=a,h$$

$$K_{qprdmix} =\sum_{i=1}^{m}W_{i} \frac{\eta_{ci}K_{qrpi}}{P_{ci}^{p}} \quad \text{where} \quad q=a,h  \quad \text{and} \quad p=2,3$$

QZS recommends to drop the dilute gas term for the uncertain fluid components which are usually the heavier (hydrocarbon) components. The formula is kept here for consistency. The mixing rules for the uncertain components are

$$\ln \left( \eta_{0umix} \right) = \sum_{i=m+1}^{N} z_{i} \ln ( \eta_{0i} ) \quad \text{or} \quad \eta_{0mix} = \prod_{i=m+1}^{N} \eta_{0i}^{z_{i}}$$

$$K_{qrumix} =\sum_{i=m+1}^{N}W_{i} \frac{D_{pi}K_{qri}}{P_{ci}} \quad \text{where} \quad q=a,h$$

$$K_{qprumix} =\sum_{i=m+1}^{N}W_{i} \frac{D_{pi}K_{qpri}}{P_{ci}^{p}} \quad \text{where} \quad q=a,h  \quad \text{and} \quad p=2,3$$

$$\varepsilon = 0.30 \quad \text{when SRK, PR or PRSV EOS is used}$$

==== Dilute gas limit ====
Zéberg-Mikkelsen (2001) proposed an empirical model for dilute gas viscosity of fairly spherical molecules as follows

$$\eta_{0} = d_{g1} \sqrt{T} + d_{g2} T^{d_{g3}}$$

or

$$\eta_{0} = D_{g1} \sqrt{T_{r}} + D_{g2} T_{r}^{D_{g3}}$$

$$D_{g1} = d_{g1} \cdot \sqrt{T_{c}} \quad \text{and} \quad D_{g2} = d_{g2} \cdot T_{c}^{d_{g3}}
\quad \text{and} \quad D_{g3} = d_{g3}$$

The unit equations for viscosity and temperature are

$$\left[ \eta_{0} \right] = \mu P \quad \text{and} \quad  \left[ T \right]  = K$$

The second term is a correction term for high temperatures. Note that most $d_{g2}$ parameters are negative.

Parameters for light gas viscosity using PR EOS
chemical	name	$d_{g1}$	$d_{g2}$	$d_{g3}$
formula		μP/K^{0.5}	μP/K^{d_{g3}}	1
Ar	Argon	28.2638	−80.5002	0.206762
He	Helium	3.65477	1.80913	0.758601
H_{2}	Hydrogen	−1.55199	2.92788	0.645731
Kr	Krypton	37.0292	−101.369	0.232700
CH_{2}	Methane	13.3919	−47.9429	0.160913
Ne	Neon	36.6876	−49.5702	0.325255
N_{2}	Nitrogen	19.1275	−53.0591	0.184743
O_{2}	Oxygen	23.7298	−67.7604	0.192271

.

==== Light gases ====
Zéberg-Mikkelsen (2001) proposed a FF-model for light gas viscosity as follows

$$\eta_{lg}  = \eta_{0} + K_{a} P_{a} + K_{h} P_{h} + K_{h2} P_{h}^{2}$$

The friction functions for light gases are simple

$$K_{a} = B_{a0}$$

$$K_{h} = B_{h0}$$

$$K_{h2} = \frac { B_{h20} } {T_{r}^{2}}$$

The FF-model for light gas is valid for low, normal, critical and super critical conditions for these gases. Although the FF-model for viscosity of dilute gas is recommended, any accurate viscosity model for dilute gas can also be used with good results.

The unit equations for viscosity and temperature are

$$\left[ \eta_{lg} \right] = \mu P \quad \text{and} \quad  \left[ T \right]  = K$$

Parameters for light gas viscosity using PR EOS
chemical	name	$B_{a0}$	$B_{h0}$	$B_{h20}$
formula		μP/bar	μP/bar	μP/bar^{2}
Ar	Argon	−0.727451	0.102756	1.50831E-4
He	Helium	−0.507319	−0.0427035	2.72888E-2
H_{2}	Hydrogen	−0.332575	−0.00185308	1.35146E-4
Kr	Krypton	−0.941704	0.152164	1.43747E-4
CH_{2}	Methane	−0.382909	0.0731796	6.63615E-5
Ne	Neon	−0.794717	0.0517444	7.44634E-4
N_{2}	Nitrogen	−0.675406	0.0806720	2.81086E-4
O_{2}	Oxygen	−0.643424	0.0633893	1.17249E-4

Parameters for light gas viscosity using SRK EOS
chemical	name	$B_{a0}$	$B_{h0}$	$B_{h20}$
formula		μP/bar	μP/bar	μP/bar^{2}
Ar	Argon	−0.835290	0.115788	1.78345E-4
He	Helium	−0.831727	−0.0367788	2.64680E-2
H_{2}	Hydrogen	−0.436199	0.00256407	2.29206E-4
Kr	Krypton	−0.992414	0.173573	2.36628E-4
CH_{2}	Methane	−0.422054	0.0803060	9.48629E-5
Ne	Neon	−0.846085	0.0606315	1.00209E-3
N_{2}	Nitrogen	−0.760370	0.0901145	3.50877E-4
O_{2}	Oxygen	−0.714059	0.0724354	1.57748E-4

Parameters for light gas viscosity using PRSV EOS
chemical	name	$B_{a0}$	$B_{h0}$	$B_{h20}$
formula		μP/bar	μP/bar	μP/bar^{2}
Ar	Argon	−0.761658	0.0652867	1.67369E-4
He	Helium	−1.14514	−0.0213745	1.48013E-2
H_{2}	Hydrogen	−0.33798	−0.00260014	1.38423E-4
Kr	Krypton	−0.957231	0.122511	1.58880E-4
CH_{2}	Methane	−0.39996	0.0542854	7.52500E-5
Ne	Neon	−0.784327	0.0378022	7.95184E-4
N_{2}	Nitrogen	−0.684294	0.0498357	3.03099E-4
O_{2}	Oxygen	−0.662772	0.0378931	1.26928E-4

Parameters for light gas viscosity using SRKM EOS
chemical	name	$B_{a0}$	$B_{h0}$	$B_{h20}$
formula		μP/bar	μP/bar	μP/bar^{2}
Ar	Argon	−0.877401	0.0683988	2.03442E-4
He	Helium	−1.34900	−0.0202833	1.83984E-2
H_{2}	Hydrogen	−0.400596	−0.00136468	2.22197E-4
Kr	Krypton	−1.01227	0.136152	2.56269E-4
CH_{2}	Methane	−0.444138	0.056294	1.07892E-4
Ne	Neon	−0.825002	0.0431686	1.08049E-3
N_{2}	Nitrogen	−0.765597	0.0540651	3.80282E-4
O_{2}	Oxygen	−0.735723	0.0422321	1.71242E-4

.

== Transition state analogy ==
This article started with viscosity for mixtures by displaying equations for dilute gas based on elementary kinetic theory, hard core (kinetic) theory and proceeded to selected theories (and models) that aimed at modeling viscosity for dense gases, dense fluids and supercritical fluids. Many or most of these theories where based on a philosophy of how gases behaves with molecules flying around, colliding with other molecules and exchanging (linear) momentum and thus creating viscosity. When the fluid became liquid, the models started to deviate from measurements because a small error in the calculated molar volume from the EOS is related to a large change in pressure and vica versa, and thus also in viscosity. The article has now come to the other end where theories (or models) are based on a philosophy of how a liquid behaves and give rise to viscosity. Since molecules in a liquid are much closer to each other, one may wonder how often a molecule in one sliding fluid surface finds a free volume in the neighboring sliding surface that is big enough for the molecule to jump into it. This may be rephrased as: when do a molecule have enough energy in its fluctuating movements to squeeze into a small open volume in the neighboring sliding surface, similar to a molecule that collides with another molecule and locks into it in a chemical reaction, and thus creates a new compound, as modeled in the transition state theory (TS theory and TS model).

=== Free volume theory ===
The free volume theory (short FV theory and FV model) originates from Doolittle (1951) who proposed that viscosity is related to the free volume fraction $f_{\nu}$ in a way that is analogous to the Arrhenius equation. The viscosity model of Doolittle (1951) is

$$\eta = A \exp \left[ \frac{B}{f_{\nu}} \right] \quad \text{where} \quad f_{\nu}  = \frac{V - b} {b}$$

where $V$ is the molar volume and $b$ is the molar hard core volume.

There where, however, little activity on the FV theory until Allal et al. (1996, 2001a) proposed a relation between the free volume fraction and parameters (and/or variables) at the molecular level of the fluid (also called the microstructure of the fluid). The 1996-model became the start of a period with high research activity where different models were put forward. The surviving model was presented by Allal et al. (2001b), and this model will be displayed below.

The viscosity model is composed of a dilute gas contribution $\eta_{0}$ (or $\eta_{dg}$ ) and a dense-fluid contribution $\eta_{df}$ (or dense-state contribution $\eta_{ds}$ or $\Delta \eta$).

$$\eta = \eta_{0} + \eta_{df}$$

Allal et al. (2001b) showed that the dense-fluid contribution to viscosity can be related to the friction coefficient $\zeta$ of the sliding fluid surface, and Dulliens (1963) has shown that the self-diffusion coefficient $D$ is related to the friction coefficient of an internal fluid surface. These two relations are shown here:

$$\eta_{df} = \frac{\rho N_{A}L_{p}^{2}\zeta}{M} \quad \text{and} \quad D = \frac{k_{B}T}{\zeta}$$

By eliminating the friction coefficient $\zeta$, Boned et al. (2004) expressed the characteristic length $L_{p}$ as

$$L_{p}^{2} = \frac{DM \eta_{df}}{\rho N_{A} k_{B}T} = \frac{DM \eta_{df}}{\rho RT}$$

The right hand side corresponds to the so-called Dullien invariant which was derived by Dullien (1963, 1972). A result from this is that the characteristic length $L_{p}$ is interpreted as the average momentum transfer distance to a molecule that will enter a free volume site and collide with a neighboring molecule.

The friction coefficient $\zeta$ is modeled by Allal et alios (2001b) as

$$\zeta = \zeta_{0} \exp \left[ \frac{B}{f_{\nu}} \right] \quad \text{and} \quad \zeta_{0} = \frac{E}{N_{A}L_{d}} \left( \frac{M}{3RT}\right)^{1/2}$$

The free volume fraction is now related to the energy E by

$$f_{\nu} = \left( \frac {RT}{E} \right)^{3/2} \quad \text{and} \quad E = E_{0} + PV  \quad \text{and} \quad E_{0} = \alpha \rho$$
$$\text{where} \quad \rho = \frac{M} {V}$$

where $E$ is the total energy a molecule must use in order to diffuse into a vacant volume, and $PV$ is connected to the work (or energy) necessary to form or expand a vacant volume available for diffusion of a molecule. The energy $E_{0}$ is the barrier energy that the molecule must overcome in order to diffuse, and it is modeled to be proportional to mass density in order to improve match of measured viscosity data. Note that the sensitive term $V-b$ in the denominator of Doolittle's (1951) model has disappeared, making the viscosity model of Allal et alios (2001b) more robust to numerical calculations of liquid molar volume by an imperfect EOS. The pre-exponential factor A is now a function and becomes

$$A = \frac{L_{c} \rho (\alpha\rho+PV)}{\sqrt{3MRT}} \quad \text{where} \quad L_{c} = \frac{L_{p}^{2}}{L_{d}}$$

The viscosity model proposed by Allal et al.(2001b) is thus

$$\eta =\eta_{0} + A  \exp \left[ B \left( \frac{\alpha\rho+PV}{RT} \right)^{3/2} \right]$$

A digression is that the self-diffusion coefficient of Boned et al. (2004) becomes

$$D =\frac{RT L_{d}}{\alpha\rho+PV} \sqrt{\frac{3RT}{M}}  \exp \left[ - B \left( \frac{\alpha\rho+PV}{RT} \right)^{3/2} \right]$$

Local nomenclature list:

- $B$ parameter that characterizes the free volume overlap or empirical tuning parameter [1]
- $b$ molar hard core volume [m^{3}/mol]
- $E$ total energy which the molecule must use in order to diffuse [J/mole]
- $E_{0}$ barrier energy which the molecule must overcome in order to diffuse [J/mole]
- $L_{p}$ average momentum transfer distance for a molecular that transfer linear momentum (conf. hard core radius) and/or angular momentum (conf. radius of gyration) [Å]
- $L_{d}$ dissipation length to the energy E [Å]
- $L_{c}$ composite parameter that is characteristic for viscosity [Å]
- $M$ molar mass, conf. molecular weight [kg/mol]
- $N_{A}$ Avogadros constant
- $P$ pressure [MPa]
- $R$ gas constant R = 8.31451 [K·J/mol]
- $V$ molar volume [m^{3}/mol]
- $\alpha$ characteristic parameter or empirical tuning parameter [1]
- $\eta$ viscosity [Pas]
- $\rho$ mass density [kg/m^{3}]
- $\zeta$ friction coefficient of a molecule related to the mobility of the molecule [1]
- $\zeta_{0}$ friction coefficient for zero mass density i.e. for a dilute system / low pressure limit [1]

==== Mixture ====
The mixture viscosity is

$$\eta_{mix} = \eta_{0mix} + \eta_{dfmix}$$

The dilute gas viscosity $\eta_{0}$ is taken from Chung et al.(1988) which is displayed in the section on SS theory. The dense fluid contribution to viscosity in FV theory is

$$\eta_{dfmix} = \frac {L_{cmix} \rho_{eos}(\alpha_{mix} \rho_{eos} + PV_{eos})}{\sqrt{3RTM_{mix}}}
\exp {\left[ B_{mix} \left( \frac{ \alpha_{mix} \rho_{eos} + PV_{eos}}{RT} \right)^{3/2} \right] }$$

where $\alpha \text{,} \, B \text{,} \, L_{c} \,$ are three characteristic parameters of the fluid w.r.t. viscosity calculations. For fluid mixtures are these three parameters calculated using mixing rules. If the self-diffusion coefficient is included in the governing equations, probably via the diffusion equation, use of four characteristic parameters (i.e. use of L_{p} and L_{d} instead of L_{c}) will give a consistent flow model, but flow studies that involves the diffusion equation belongs a small class of special studies.

The unit for the viscosity is [Pas], when all other units are kept in SI units.

==== Mixing rules ====
At the end of the intensive research period Allal et al. (2001c) and Canet (2001) proposed two different set of mixing rules, and according to Almasi (2015) there has been no agreement in the literature about which are the best mixing rules. Almasi (2015) therefore recommended the classic linear mole weighted mixing rules which are displayed below for a mixture of N fluid components.

$$M_{mix} = M_{n} = \sum_{i=1}^{N} z_{i} M_{i}$$

$$\alpha_{mix} = \sum_{i=1}^{N} z_{i} \alpha_{i}$$

$$B_{mix} = \sum_{i=1}^{N} z_{i} B_{i}$$

$$L_{cmix} = \sum_{i=1}^{N} z_{i} L_{ci}$$

The three characteristic viscosity parameters $\, \alpha_{i}, \, B_{i}, L_{ci} \,$ are usually established by optimizing the viscosity formula against measured viscosity data for pure fluids (i.e. single component fluids).

==== Trend functions ====
The three characteristic viscosity parameters $\, \alpha_{}, \, B_{}, L_{c} \,$ are usually established by optimizing the viscosity formula against measured viscosity data for pure fluids (i.e. single component fluids). Data for these parameters can then be stored in databases together with data for other chemical and physical material properties and information. This happens more often if use of the equation becomes widespread. Hydrocarbon molecules is a huge group of molecules that has several subgroups which itself contains molecules of the same basic structure, but with different lengths. The alkanes is the simplest of these groups. A material property of molecules in such a group normally shows up as a function when plotted against another material property. A mathematical function is then selected based physical/chemical knowledge, experience and intuition, and the empirical parameters (i.e. constants) in the function are determined by curve fitting. Such a function is called a trend or trend function, and the group of molecule types is called a homologous series. Llovell et al. (2013a, 2013b) proposed trend functions for the three FV parameters $\alpha, \, B, \, L_{c} \,$ for alkanes. Oliveira et al. (2014) proposed trend functions for the FV parameters for fatty acid methyl esters (FAME) and fatty acid ethyl esters (FAEE), both including compounds with up to three unsaturated bonds, which are displayed below.

$$\alpha = a_{0} + a_{1}M$$

$$B = b_{0} + b_{1}M + b_{2}M^{2}$$

$$L_{c} = c_{0} + c_{1}M$$

The molar mass M [g/mol] (or molecular mass / weight) associated with the parameters used in curve fitting process (where $a_{i}$, $b_{i}$, and $c_{i}$ are empirical parameters) corresponds to carbon numbers in the range 8-24 and 8-20 for FAME and FAEE respectively.

=== Significant structure theory ===
Viscosity models based on significant structure theory, a designation originating from Eyring, (short SS theory and SS model) has in the first two decades of the 2000s evolved in a development relay. It starting with Macías-Salinas et al.(2003), continued with a significant contribution from Cruz-Reyes et al.(2005), followed by a third stage of development by Macías-Salinas et al.(2013), whose model is displayed here. The SS theories have three basic assumptions:

- A liquid behaves similar to a solid in many aspects, e.g. a sensitive relation between molar volume (or mass density) and pressure; position and distance between molecules is like a quasi-lattice with "fluidized vacancies" of molecular size distributed randomly throughout the quazi-lattice. The vacancies are assumed to have molecular size and move freely throughout the quasi-lattise structure.
- The fluid viscosity is calculated from two components which is a gas-like and a solid-like contribution, and both contributions contain all molecule types occurring in the fluid phase. A molecule that jumps from one sliding surface to a vacant site in the neighboring surface, is said to display gas-like behavior. A molecule that remains on its site in the sliding surface for some time, is said to display solid-like behavior.
- Collisions between molecules from neighboring layers are equivalent to molecules jumping to vacant sites, and these events within viscosity modeling are analogous to chemical reactions between colliding molecules within TS theory.

The fraction of gas-like molecules $X_{gl}$ and solid-like molecules $X_{sl}$ are

$$X_{gl} = (V - V_{s})/V \quad \text{and} \quad X_{sl} = V_{s}/V \quad \text{and} \quad V_{s} \approx b$$

where $V$ is the molar volume of the phase in question, $V_{s}$ is the molar volume of solid-like molecules and $b$ is the molar hard core volume. The viscosity of the fluid is a mixture of these two classes of molecules

$$\eta = X_{gl}\eta_{gl} + X_{sl} \eta_{sl}$$

==== Gas-like contribution ====
The gas-like viscosity contribution is taken from the viscosity model of Chung et al.(1984, 1988), which is based on the Chapman–Enskog(1964) kinetic theory of viscosity for dilute gases and the empirical expression of Neufeld et al.(1972) for the reduced collision integral, but expanded empirical to handle polyatomic, polar and hydrogen bonding fluids over a wide temperature range. The viscosity model of Chung et al.(1988) is

$$\eta_{gl} = 40.785 \frac{\sqrt{MT^{*}}}{V_{c}^{2/3} \Omega^{*}} * F_{c}
\quad \text{with unit equation} \quad [ \eta_{gl} ] = \mu P$$

$$\Omega^{*} = \frac{1.16145}{(T^{*})^{0.14874}} +
\frac{0.52487}{exp(0.7732T^{*})} +
\frac{2.16178}{exp(2.43787T^{*})} -
6.435 \times 10^{-4} (T^{*})^{0.14874} *
sin \left[ 18.0323 (T^{*})^{0.7683} - 7.27371 \right]$$

where

$$T^{*} = 1.2593 * T / T_{c}
\quad \text{and} \quad F_{c} = 1 - 0.2756 \omega +
0.059035 \mu_{r}^{4}  + \kappa$$

Local nomenclature list:

- $F_{c} \,$ : factor for molecular shape and polarities of dilute gases [1]
- $M \$ : molar mass, conf. molecular weight [g/mol]
- $T \ \$ : temperature [K]
- $T_{c} \$ : critical temperature [K]
- $V_{c} \$ : molar critical volume [cm^{3}/mol]
- $\eta_{gl} \,$ : gas-like viscosity contribution [μP]
- $\kappa \ \ \,$ : correction factor for hydrogen bonding effects [1]
- $\mu_{r} \,$ : reduced dipole moment [1]
- $\Omega^{*}$ : reduced collision integral [1]
- $\omega \ \$ : acentric factor [1]

==== Solid-like contribution ====
In the 2000s, the development of the solid-like viscosity contribution started with Macías-Salinas et al.(2003) who used the Eyring equation in TS theory as an analogue to the solid-like viscosity contribution, and as a generalization of the first exponential liquid viscosity model proposed by Reynolds(1886). The Eyring equation models irreversible chemical reactions at constant pressure, and the equation therefore uses Gibbs activation energy, $\Delta G^{\ddagger}$, to model the transition state energy that the system uses to move matter (i.e. separate molecules) from the initial state to the final state (i.e. the new compound). In the Couette flow, the system moves matter from one sliding surface to another, due to fluctuating internal energy, and probably also due to pressure and the pressure gradient. Besides, the pressure effect on viscosity is somewhat different for systems in a medium pressure range than it is for systems in a very high pressure range. Cruz-Reyes et al.(2005) uses Helmholtz energy (F = U-TS = G-PV) as potential in the exponential function. This gives

$$\eta_{sl} = A * exp{\left[ -\frac{\Delta G^{\ddagger} - PV}{RT} \right]}$$

Cruz-Reyes et al.(2005) states that the Gibbs activation energy is negative proportional to the internal energy of vaporization (and thus calculated at a point on the freezing curve), but Macías-Salinas et al.(2013) changes that to be the residual internal energy, $\Delta U^{r}$, at the general pressure and temperature of the system. One could alternatively use the grand potential ($\Omega$ = U-TS-G = -PV, sometimes called Landau energy or potential) in the exponential function and argue that the Couette flow is not a homogeneous system, such that a term with the residual internal energy must be added. Both arguments gives the proposed solid-like contribution which is

$$\eta_{sl} = A*exp \left[ -\frac{\alpha \Delta U^{r}-PV}{RT} \right]
= A*exp \left[ -\frac{ \alpha \Delta U^{r}}{RT} + Z \right]$$

The pre-exponential factor $A$ is taken as

$$A = \frac{RT}{V-b} * \frac{1}{\nu}$$

The jumping frequency of a molecule that jumps from its initial position to a vacant site, $\nu$, is made dependent on the number of vacancies, $X_{gl}$, and pressure in order to extend the applicability of $\eta_{sl}$ to much wider ranges of temperature and pressure than a constant jumping frequency would do. The final jumping frequency model is

$$\nu = X_{gl}^{-1} * 10^{12} \left( \nu_{0}+\nu_{1}P \right) =
\frac {V}{V - b} * 10^{12} \left( \nu_{0}+\nu_{1}P \right)$$

A recurrent problem for viscosity models is the calculation of liquid molar volume for a given pressure using an EOS that is not perfect. This calls for introduction of some empirical parameters. Use of adjustable proportionality factors for both the residual internal energy and the Z-factor is a natural choice. The sensitivity of P versus V-b values for liquids makes it natural to introduce an empirical exponent (power) to the dimensionless Z-factor. The empirical power turns out to be very effective in the high pressure (high Z-factor) region. The solid-like viscosity contribution proposed by Macías-Salinas et al.(2013) is then

$$\eta_{sl} = \frac{RT}{V}*
\frac{1}{10^{12} \left( \nu_{0}+\nu_{1}P \right)}*
exp \left[ - \alpha \frac{\Delta U^{r}}{RT} \right]*
exp \left[ \beta_{0}Z^{\beta_{1}} \right]$$

Local nomenclature list:

- $b \ \ \ \ \$ : molar hard core volume of the fluid phase [cm^{3}/mol]
- $P \ \ \ \,$ : pressure [bar]
- $T \ \ \ \,$ : temperature [K]
- $V \ \ \ \,$ : molar volume of the fluid phase [cm^{3}/mol]
- $X_{jl} \$ : volume fraction of the j-like contribution j=g,s [1]
- $Z \ \ \ \,$ : compressibility factor (Z-factor) [1]
- $\alpha \ \ \ \$ : proportionality factor [1]
- $\beta_{i} \ \ \$ : adjustable parameters i=0,1 [1]
- $\eta \ \ \ \ \,$ : viscosity of the fluid phase [μPa·s]
- $\eta_{sl} \ \$ : solid-like viscosity contribution [μPa·s]
- $\nu_{i} \ \ \$ : adjustable parameters i=0,1 [s^{−1}] and [bar^{−1}s^{−1}]
- $\Delta G^{\ne}$ : activation energy of the fluid [J/mol]
- $\Delta U^{r} \,$ : residual internal energy of the fluid [J/mol]

==== Mixture ====
$$\eta_{mix} = \frac{V_{mix}-b_{mix}}{V_{mix}} * \eta_{gl}^{mix} + \frac{b_{mix}}{V_{mix}} * \eta_{sl}^{mix}$$

$$\eta_{gl}^{mix} = F ( T_{cmix},M_{cmix},V_{cmix},\omega_{mix},\mu_{rmix};T)$$

$$\eta_{sl}^{mix} = F ( V_{mix},\Delta U_{mix}^{r},Z_{mix};P,T)$$

In order to clarify the mathematical statements above, the solid-like contribution for a fluid mixture is displayed in more details below.

$$\eta_{sl}^{mix} = \frac{RT}{V_{mix}}*
\frac{1}{10^{12} \left( \nu_{0}+\nu_{1}P \right)}*
exp \left[ - \alpha \frac{\Delta U_{mix}^{r}}{RT} \right]*
exp \left[ \beta_{0}Z_{mix}^{\beta_{1}} \right]$$

==== Mixing rules ====
The variables $V_{mix},\Delta U_{mix}^{r},Z_{mix}$ and all EOS parameters for a fluid mixture are taken from the EOS (conf. W) and the mixing rules used by the EOS (conf. Q). More details on this is displayed below.

A fluid of n mole in the single phase region where the total fluid composition is $\mathbf{z}$ [molefractions]:

$$Q_{mix} = Q_{eos}(\mathbf{z}) \quad \text{and} \quad W_{mix} = W_{eos}(P,T,\mathbf{z})$$

Gas phase of n_{g} mole in two-phase region where the gas composition is $\mathbf{y}$ [molefractions]:

$$Q_{mix} = Q_{eos}(\mathbf{y}) \quad \text{and} \quad W_{mix} = W_{eos}(P,T,\mathbf{y})$$

Liquid phase of n_{l} mole in two-phase region where the liquid composition is $\mathbf{x}$ [molefractions]:

$$Q_{mix} = Q_{eos}(\mathbf{x}) \quad \text{and} \quad W_{mix} = W_{eos}(P,T,\mathbf{x})$$

where

$$n = n_{l} + n_{g} \quad \text{and} \quad n z_{i} = n_{l}x_{i} + n_{g}y_{i} \quad \text{and} \quad  i = 1,\ldots,N$$

$$Q = T_{c}, M, V_{c}, \omega, b \quad \text{and} \quad W = V, \Delta U^{r}, Z$$

Since nearly all input to this viscosity model is provided by the EOS and the equilibrium calculations, this SS model (or TS model) for viscosity should be very simple to use for fluid mixtures. The viscosity model also have some empirical parameters that can be used as tuning parameters to compensate for imperfect EOS models and secure high accuracy also for fluid mixtures.

== See also ==
- Collision theory
- Compressibility factor
- Concentration
- Conversion of units
- Curve fitting
- Dortmund Data Bank
- Ideal gas
- Ideal gas law
- Kinetic theory of gases
- List of thermodynamic properties
- Molar volume
- PSRK
- Real gas
- Real gas law
- Statistical mechanics
- Statistical physics
- Table of thermodynamic equations
- Transport phenomena
- Trend estimation
- VTPR
