= Jürgen Gmehling =

German chemist (born 1946)

Jürgen Gmehling (born 13 January 1946 in Duisburg) is a retired German professor of technical and industrial chemistry at the Carl von Ossietzky University of Oldenburg.

== Biography ==
His career started with an apprenticeship as a laboratory assistant at the Duisburg copper works before he studied chemical engineering at the engineering school in Essen and then chemistry in Dortmund and Clausthal. He received his diploma from the University of Dortmund in 1970 and his PhD (Dr. rer. nat., inorganic chemistry) in 1973. After this he worked as a scientific coworker in Dortmund before he became a private lecturer and, after his habilitation, an assistant professor.

Gmehling was appointed a full professor for technical chemistry at the University of Oldenburg in 1989 and retired in 2011.

== Fields of research ==
Gmehling's main focus is the process development. This includes the development of software for process synthesis and process simulation as well as measurement, collection, and estimation of thermophysical properties of pure components and component mixtures. The following list summarizes fields of his scientific work but is in no way complete.

=== Measurements ===
- Phase equilibrium data (vapor-liquid equilibria, liquid-liquid equilibria, solid–liquid equilibria, gas solubilities, heats of mixing, activity coefficients and more)

=== Data collection ===
Gmehling began in the 1970s with the systematic evaluation of the scientific literature, aiming to build a data bank for vapor-liquid equilibria. These data were needed for the development of a new method for the prediction of activity coefficients named UNIFAC. This data bank is still named the Dortmund Data Bank.

=== Development of estimation and correlation models ===
Gmehling developed with colleagues models for the estimation of several thermodynamic and thermophysical properties:

- Activity coefficient models like UNIFAC (see also group contribution method) and extensions. For the further development of these widely used methods Gmehling founded an industry consortium where many international companies are participating.
- Equations of state (EOS) including mixing rules for applying EOS to mixtures (see PSRK).

=== Software development ===
The following implementation of his methods are also developments:

- an expert system for the entrainer selection for the azeotropic and extractive distillation

== Awards ==
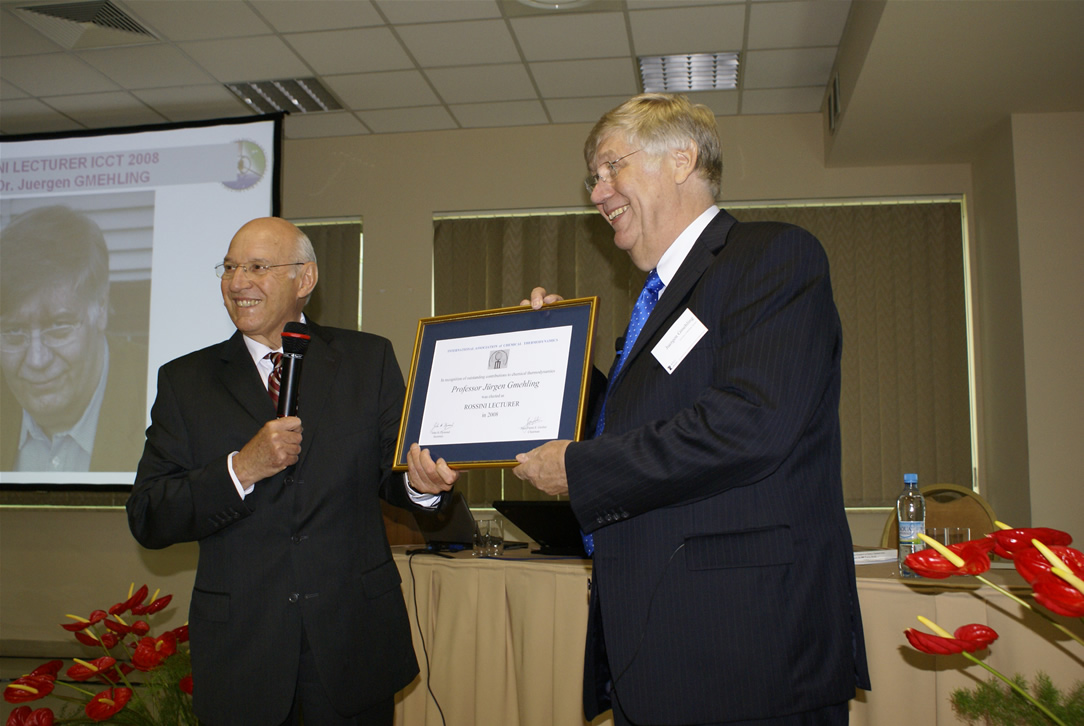
Rossini Lectureship Award; left: J.-P. E. Grolier; right: J. Gmehling

Gmehling has received some awards:

- Arnold-Eucken Price in 1982
- The Rosini Lectureship Award in 2008
- The Gmelin-Beilstein-Denkmünze (Silver Medal) in 2010
- The Emil Kirschbaum Medal in 2013

== Publications ==
Gmehling has published scientific articles and books.
