= VTPR =

VTPR (short for Volume-Translated Peng–Robinson) is an estimation method for the calculation of phase equilibria of mixtures of chemical components. The original goal for the development of this method was to enable the estimation of properties of mixtures which contain supercritical components. These class of substances couldn't be predicted with established models like UNIFAC.

== Principle ==
VTPR is a group contribution equation of state. This is class of prediction methods combine equations of state (mostly cubic) with activity coefficient models based on group contributions like UNIFAC. The activity coefficient model is used to adapt the equation of state parameters for mixtures by a so-called mixing rule.

The usage of an equation of state introduces all thermodynamic relations defined for equations of state into the VTPR model. This allows the calculation of densities, enthalpies, heat capacities, and more.

== Equations ==
VTPR is based on a combination of the Peng–Robinson equation of state with a mixing rule whose parameters are determined by UNIFAC.

=== Equation of state ===
The Peng–Robinson equation of state is defined as follows:

$P = \frac{ R \; T } { v - b } - \frac{ a\; \alpha(T) } { v^2 + 2bv - b^2 }$

The originally used α-function has been replaced by the function of Twu, Bluck, Cunningham and Coon .

$\alpha(T_r) = T_r^{N \left( M-1 \right)} exp \left( L \left( 1- T_r^{ M N }\right) \right)$

The parameters of the Twu equation are fitted to experimental vapor pressure data of pure components and guarantee therefore a better description of the vapor pressure than the original relation.

=== Mixing rule ===
The VTPR mixing rule calculate the parameter a and b of the equation of state by

$a(T) = b \cdot \left( \sum_i {x_i} \frac{a_{ii}(T)}{b_{ii}} + \frac{g^E_{res}} {-0.53087} \right)$

with

$P_{ref} = 1\,atm$

and

$b_{ij}^{3/4} = \frac{ b_{ii}^{3/4} + b_{jj}^{3/4} }{2}$

$b_{ii}=0.0778 \cdot \frac{R \cdot T_{c,i}}{P_{c,i}}$

$b = \sum_i \sum_j x_i \; x_j \; b_{ij}$

by the parameters a_{i} und b_{i} of the pure substances, their mole fractions x_{i} and the residual part of excess Gibbs energy g^{E}. The excess Gibbs energy is calculated by a modified UNIFAC model.

== Model parameters ==
For the equation of state VTPR needs the critical temperature and pressure and additionally at least the acentric factor for all pure components in the considered mixture.

A better quality can be achieved if the acentric factor is replaced by Twu constants which have been fitted to experimal vapor pressure data of pure components.

The mixing rule uses UNIFAC which needs a variety of UNIFAC-specific parameters. Beside some model constants the most important are group interaction parameters which are fitted to experimental vapor–liquid equilibria of mixtures.

Hence, for high-quality model parameters experimental data (pure component vapor pressures and vapor–liquid equilibrium and liquid–liquid equilibrium data, activity coefficients of mixtures, heats of mixing) are needed. These are normally provided by factual data banks like the Dortmund Data Bank which has been the base for the VTPR development.

== Volume translation ==
VTPR implements a correction to the pure component densities resp. volume. This volume translation corrects systematic deviations of the Peng–Robinson equation of state (PR EOS). The translation constant is obtained by determining the difference between the calculated density at T_{r}=0.7 and the real value of the density obtained from experimental data. T_{r} is close to the normal boiling point for many substances. The volume translation constant c_{i}

$c_i=v_{PR,i}-v_{exp,i}$

is therefore component specific.

This volume/density translation is then applied to the complete density/volume curve calculated by the PR EOS. This is sufficient because the calculated curve has the right slope and is only shifted.

The Peng–Robinson equation of state is then

$P=\frac{R \cdot T}{v+c-b} - \frac{a \cdot \alpha(T)}{(v+c) \cdot (v+c+b) + b \cdot (v+c-b)}$

== Modifications to the UNIFAC model ==
UNIFAC use two separate parts to calculate the activity coefficients, a combinatorial part and a residual part. The combinatorial part is calculated only from group specific constants and is omitted in the VTPR model. VTPR use only the residual part calculated from interaction parameters between groups.

$g_{res}^E= R \cdot T \cdot \sum { x_i \cdot \ln \; \gamma_{res,i} }$

This has the side effect that r_{i} values (van der Waals volumes) are not needed and only the van der Waals surfaces q_{i} are used.

In addition, the q_{i} values are not constant properties of the groups, instead they are adjustable parameters and fitted to experimental data together with the interaction parameters between groups.

== Example calculation ==
The prediction of a vapor–liquid equilibrium is successful even in mixtures containing supercritical components.

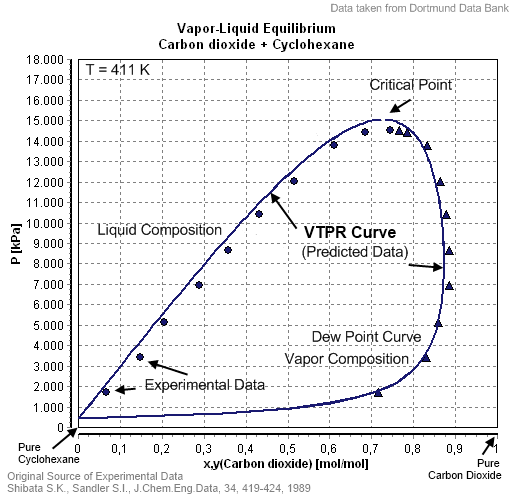

The mixture has to be subcritical though. In the given example carbon dioxide is the supercritical component with T_{c}=304.19 K and P_{c}=7475 kPa. The critical point of the mixture lies at T=411 K und P≈15000 kPa. The composition of the mixture is near 78 mole% carbon dioxide und 22 mole% cyclohexane.

VTPR describes this binary mixture quite well, the dew point curve as well as the bubble point curve and the critical point of the mixture.

== Electrolyte systems ==
VTPR normally cannot handle electrolyte containing mixtures because the underlying UNIFAC doesn't support salts. It is however possible to exchange the UNIFAC activity coefficient model by a model that supports electrolytes like LIFAC.

== See also ==
- PSRK (Predictive Soave–Redlich–Kwong), VTPRs predecessor of the same group contribution equation of state type but using a different equation of state, a different α function, and a different UNIFAC modification.
