= UNIFAC Consortium =

Private sponsorship of thermodynamic models

The UNIFAC Consortium was founded at the Carl von Ossietzky University of Oldenburg at the chair of industrial chemistry of Prof. Gmehling to invite private companies to support the further development of the group-contribution methods UNIFAC and its successor modified UNIFAC (Dortmund). Both models are used for the prediction of thermodynamic properties, especially the estimation of phase equilibria.

The UNIFAC consortium is a successful example of private sponsorship of a public university in Germany.

== History ==
The consortium was founded in 1997 when the public financing of the further development of the models became unlikely. The models UNIFAC and mod. UNIFAC (Dortmund) have already been used widely in software for the simulation and synthesis of chemical processes. Many companies doing process development in the field of chemical engineering had announced their support for a new way to subsidize the further development. This is facilitated through the support of over 40 companies, and is particularly aided by the DDBST GmbH, which supplies the complete Dortmund Data Bank (DDB) and several software tools for free. The DDB, a factual data bank for thermodynamic data, especially phase equilibrium data, is the main source for the work of the consortium.

== Objectives ==
The normal work of the consortium includes

- the creation of new and the improvement of older model parameters
- the measurement of experimental data (partly own work, partly given to contractors)
- holding annual member meetings

The consortium has e. g. added or modified 404 interaction parameters in the original UNIFAC matrix compared to the 635 parameters from the latest publication.

Interaction parameters of the original UNIFAC model

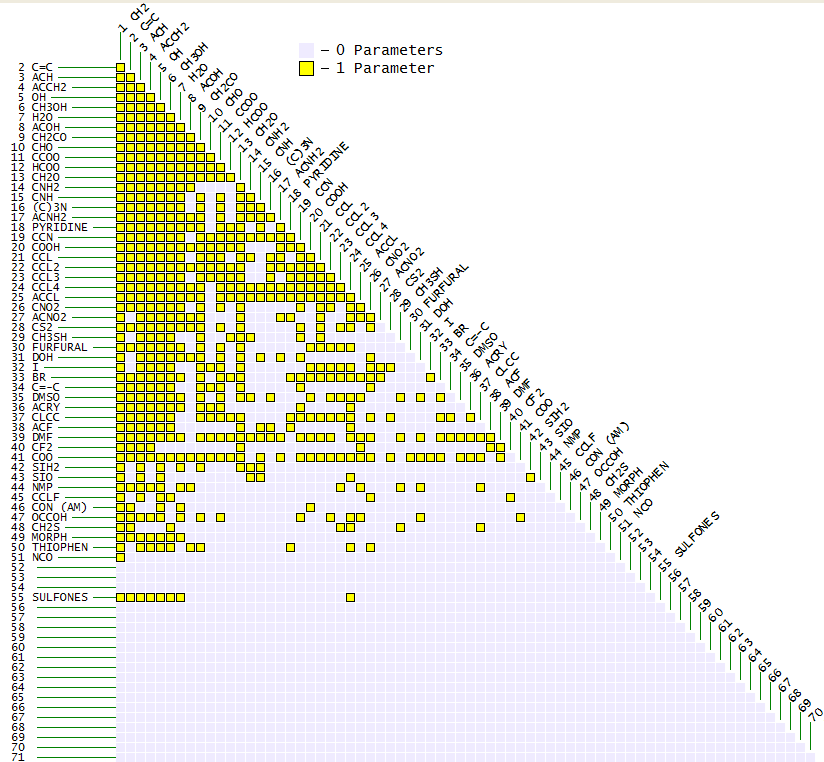
Latest published parameters

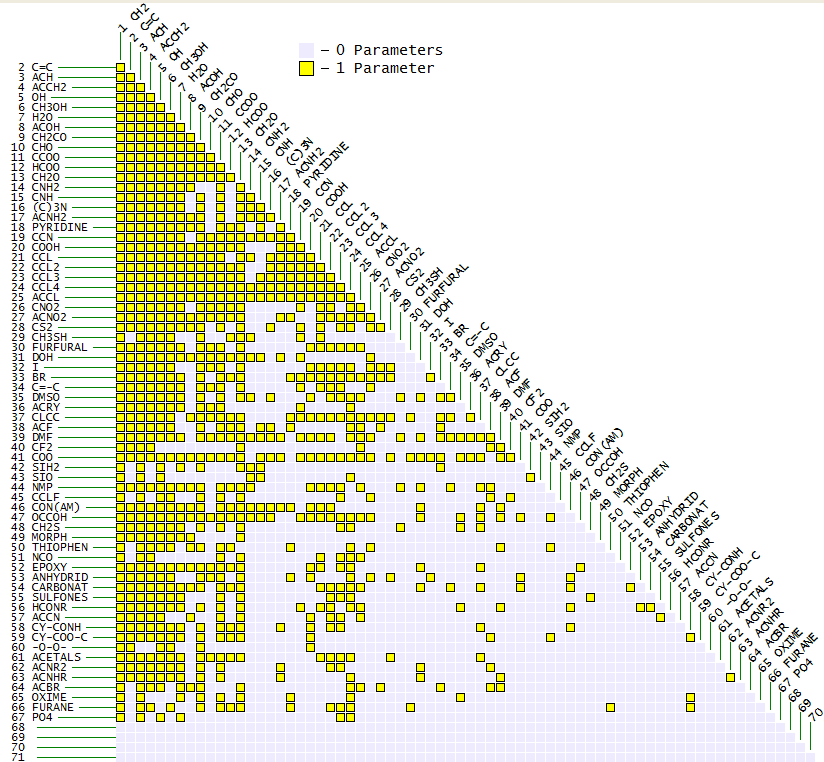
UNIFAC consortium parameters September 2008

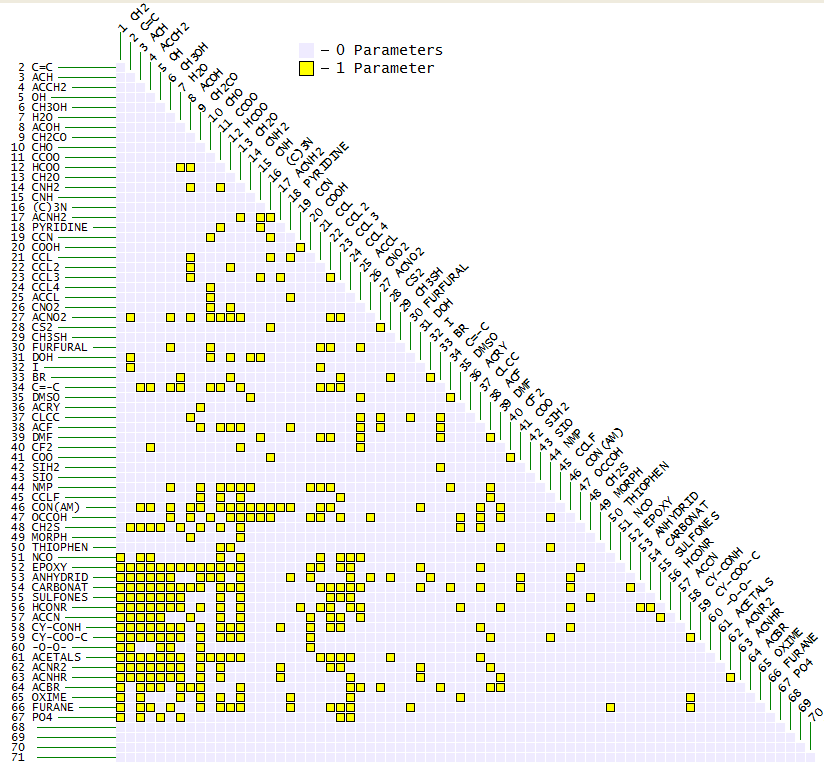
In the UNIFAC consortium added or modified parameters

The major goals are to

- improve the quality of the predictions
- extend the range of applicability of the models. This include the support for further component types with new functional groups.
- supply the parameters to process simulation and DDB software (for consortium members only)

The model parameters are confidential and only accessible to consortium members for at least two and a half year after the first delivery. After this time the university can publish the model parameters.

== Supported models ==
The UNIFAC consortium supports the development of three different models,

- original UNIFAC,
- mod. UNIFAC (Dortmund), and,
- PSRK (since 2005).

Both UNIFAC models are estimating activity coefficients, PSRK (short for Predictive Soave-Redlich-Kwong) however is a combination of the original UNIFAC model with an equation of state.
