= PSRK =

PSRK (short for Predictive Soave–Redlich–Kwong) is an estimation method for the calculation of phase equilibria of mixtures of chemical components. The original goal for the development of this method was to enable the estimation of properties of mixtures containing supercritical components. This class of substances cannot be predicted with established models, for example UNIFAC.

== Principle ==
PSRK is a group-contribution equation of state. This is a class of prediction methods that combines equations of state (mostly cubic) with activity coefficient models based on group contributions, such as UNIFAC. The activity coefficient model is used to adapt the equation-of-state parameters for mixtures by a so-called mixing rule.

The use of an equation of state introduces all thermodynamic relations defined for equations of state into the PRSK model. This allows the calculation of densities, enthalpies, heat capacities, and other properties.

== Equations ==
As stated previously, the PSRK model is based on a combination of the Soave–Redlich–Kwong equation of state with a mixing rule whose parameters are determined by the UNIFAC method.

=== Equation of state ===
The equation of state of Soave is defined as follows:

$$P = \frac{RT}{v - b} - \frac{a \alpha(T)}{v(v + b)}.$$

The original α-function has been replaced by the function of Mathias–Copeman:

$$\alpha(T_r) = \left[1 + c_1 \left(1 - \sqrt{T_r}\right) + c_2 \left(1 - \sqrt{T_r}\right)^2 + c_3 \left(1 - \sqrt{T_r}\right)^3 \right]^2.$$

The parameters of the Mathias–Copeman equation are fitted to experimental vapor-pressure data of pure components and provide a better description of the vapor pressure than the original relation. The form of the equation is chosen as it can be reduced to the original Soave form by setting the parameters c_{2} and c_{3} to zero. Additionally, the parameter c_{1} can be obtained from the acentric factor, using the relation

$$c_1 = 0.48 + 1.574 \, \omega - 0.176 \, \omega^2.$$

This may be performed if no fitted Mathias–Copeman parameter is available.

=== Mixing rule ===
The PSRK mixing rule calculates the parameters a and b of the equation of state by

$$\frac{a}{bRT} = \sum_i x_i \frac{a_i}{b_i RT} - \frac{\frac{g^E_0}{R T} + \sum x_i \ln \frac{b}{b_i}}{0.64663}$$

and

$$b = \sum_i x_i b_i,$$

where the parameters a_{i} and b_{i} are those of the pure substances, their mole fractions are given by x_{i}, and the excess Gibbs energy by g^{E}. The excess Gibbs energy is calculated by a slightly modified UNIFAC model.

== Model parameters ==
For the equation of state PSRK needs the critical temperature and pressure, additionally at a minimum the acentric factor for all pure components in the considered mixture is also required.

The integrity of the model can be improved if the acentric factor is replaced by Mathias–Copeman constants fitted to experimental vapor-pressure data of pure components.

The mixing rule uses UNIFAC, which needs a variety of UNIFAC-specific parameters. Aside from some model constants, the most important parameters are the group-interaction parameters — these are obtained from parametric fits to experimental vapor–liquid equilibria of mixtures.

Hence, for high-quality model parameters, experimental data (pure-component vapor pressures and VLE of mixtures) are needed. These are normally provided by factual data banks, like the Dortmund Data Bank, which has been the base for the PSRK development. In few cases additionally needed data have been determined experimentally if no data have been available from other sources.

The latest available parameters have been published in 2005. The further development is now taken over by the UNIFAC Consortium.

== Example calculation ==
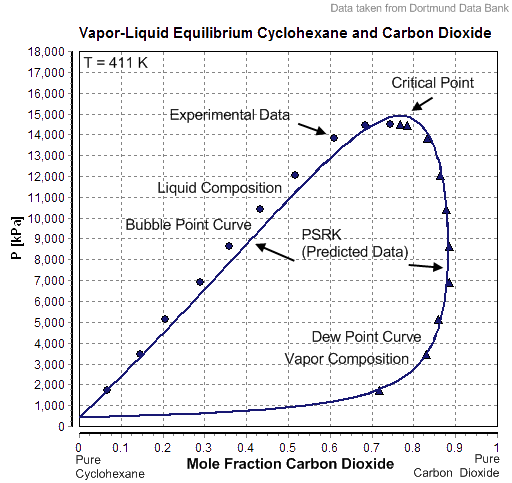
Vapor–liquid equilibrium of cyclohexane and carbon dioxide

The prediction of a vapor–liquid equilibrium is successful even in mixtures containing supercritical components. However, the mixture has to be subcritical. In the given example carbon dioxide is the supercritical component with T_{c} = 304.19 K and P_{c} = 7475 kPa. The critical point of the mixture lies at T = 411 K and P ≈ 15000 kPa. The composition of the mixture is near 78 mole% carbon dioxide and 22 mole% cyclohexane.

PSRK describes this binary mixture quite well, the dew point curve, as well as the bubble point curve and the critical point of the mixture.

== Model weaknesses ==
In a PSRK follow-up work (VTPR) some model weaknesses are quoted:

- The gradient of the Mathias–Copeman α-function is without any thermodynamic background and, if extrapolated to higher temperatures, the described vapor-pressure curve tends to diverge.
- The Soave–Redlich–Kwong equation of state describes the vapor densities of pure components and mixtures quite well, but the deviations of the liquid-density prediction are high.
- For the VLE prediction of mixtures with components that have very differing sizes (e. g. ethanol, C_{2}H_{6}O, and eicosane, C_{20}H_{42}) larger systematic errors are found.
- Heats of mixing and activity coefficients at infinite dilution are predicted poorly.
