= Kinetic diameter =

Measurement in molecular physics

Kinetic diameter is a measure applied to atoms and molecules that expresses the likelihood that a molecule in a gas will collide with another molecule. It is an indication of the size of the molecule as a target. The kinetic diameter is not the same as atomic diameter defined in terms of the size of the atom's electron shell, which is generally a lot smaller, depending on the exact definition used. Rather, it is the size of the sphere of influence that can lead to a scattering event.

Kinetic diameter is related to the mean free path of molecules in a gas. Mean free path is the average distance that a particle will travel without collision. For a fast moving particle (that is, one moving much faster than the particles it is moving through) the kinetic diameter is given by,

$$d^2 = {1 \over \pi l n}$$
where,
d is the kinetic diameter,
r is the kinetic radius, r = d/2,
l is the mean free path, and
n is the number density of particles

However, a more usual situation is that the colliding particle being considered is indistinguishable from the population of particles in general. Here, the Maxwell–Boltzmann distribution of energies must be considered, which leads to the modified expression,

$$d^2 = {1 \over \sqrt 2 \pi l n}$$

== List of diameters ==
The following table lists the kinetic diameters of some common molecules;

Molecule		Molecular mass	Kinetic diameter (pm)	ref
Name	Formula	Molecular mass	Kinetic diameter (pm)	ref
Hydrogen	H_{2}	2	289	
Helium	He	4	260	
Methane	CH_{4}	16	380	
Ammonia	NH_{3}	17	260	
Water	H_{2}O	18	265	
Neon	Ne	20	275	
Acetylene	C_{2}H_{2}	26	330	
Nitrogen	N_{2}	28	364	
Carbon monoxide	CO	28	376	
Ethylene	C_{2}H_{4}	28	390	
Nitric oxide	NO	30	317	
Oxygen	O_{2}	32	346	
Hydrogen sulfide	H_{2}S	34	360	
Hydrogen chloride	HCl	36	320	
Argon	Ar	40	340	
Propylene	C_{3}H_{6}	42	450	
Carbon dioxide	CO_{2}	44	330	
Nitrous oxide	N_{2}O	44	330	
Propane	C_{3}H_{8}	44	430	
Sulfur dioxide	SO_{2}	64	360	
Chlorine	Cl_{2}	70	320	
Benzene	C_{6}H_{6}	78	585	
Hydrogen bromide	HBr	81	350	
Krypton	Kr	84	360	
Xenon	Xe	131	396	
Sulfur hexafluoride	SF_{6}	146	550	
Carbon tetrachloride	CCl_{4}	154	590	
Bromine	Br_{2}	160	350	

== Dissimilar particles ==
Collisions between two dissimilar particles occur when a beam of fast particles is fired into a gas consisting of another type of particle, or two dissimilar molecules randomly collide in a gas mixture. For such cases, the above formula for scattering cross section has to be modified.

The scattering cross section, σ, in a collision between two dissimilar particles or molecules is defined by the sum of the kinetic diameters of the two particles,

$$\sigma = \pi (r_1 + r_2)^2$$
where.
r_{1}, r_{2} are, half the kinetic diameter (ie, the kinetic radii) of the two particles, respectively.

We define an intensive quantity, the scattering coefficient α, as the product of the gas number density and the scattering cross section,

$$\alpha \equiv n \sigma$$

The mean free path is the inverse of the scattering coefficient,

$$l = {1 \over \alpha} = {1 \over \sigma n}$$

For similar particles, r_{1} = r_{2} and,

$$l = {1 \over \sigma n} = {1 \over 4 \pi r^2 n} = {1 \over \pi d^2 n}$$

as before.

== Bibliography ==
- Breck, Donald W., "Zeolite Molecular Sieves: Structure, Chemistry, and Use", New York: Wiley, 1974 ISBN 0471099856.
- Freude, D., Molecular Physics, chapter 2, 2004 unpublished draft, retrieved and archived 18 October 2015.
- Ismail, Ahmad Fauzi; Khulbe, Kailash; Matsuura, Takeshi, Gas Separation Membranes: Polymeric and Inorganic, Springer, 2015 ISBN 3319010956.
- Joos, Georg; Freeman, Ira Maximilian, Theoretical Physics, Courier Corporation, 1958 ISBN 0486652270.
- Li, Jian-Min; Talu, Orhan, "Effect of structural heterogeneity on multicomponent adsorption: benzene and p-xylene mixture on silicalite", in Suzuki, Motoyuki (ed), Fundamentals of Adsorption, pp. 373-380, Elsevier, 1993 ISBN 0080887724.
- Matteucci, Scott; Yampolskii, Yuri; Freeman, Benny D.; Pinnau, Ingo, "Transport of gases and vapors in glassy and rubbery polymers" in, Yampolskii, Yuri; Freeman, Benny D.; Pinnau, Ingo, Materials Science of Membranes for Gas and Vapor Separation, pp. 1-47, John Wiley & Sons, 2006 ISBN 0470029048.
