= Bubble point =

Temperature of a liquid at first bubbles

Mole fraction vs. temperature diagram for a two-component system, showing the bubble point and dew point curves.

In thermodynamics, the bubble point is the temperature (at a given pressure) where the first bubble of vapor is formed when heating a liquid consisting of two or more components. Given that vapor will probably have a different composition than the liquid, the bubble point (along with the dew point) at different compositions are useful data when designing distillation systems.

For a single component the bubble point and the dew point are the same and are referred to as the boiling point.

== Calculating the bubble point ==
At the bubble point, the following relationship holds:

$$\sum_{i=1}^{N_c} y_i = \sum_{i=1}^{N_c} K_i x_i = 1$$

where

$$K_i \equiv \frac{y_{ie}}{x_{ie}}$$.

K is the distribution coefficient or K factor, defined as the ratio of mole fraction in the vapor phase $\big(y_{ie}\big)$ to the mole fraction in the liquid phase $\big(x_{ie}\big)$ at equilibrium.
When Raoult's law and Dalton's law hold for the mixture, the K factor is defined as the ratio of the vapor pressure to the total pressure of the system:

$$K_i = \frac{P'_i}{P}$$

Given either of $x_i$ or $y_i$ and either the temperature or pressure of a two-component system, calculations can be performed to determine the unknown information.

== See also ==
- Phase diagram
- Azeotrope
- Dew point
