= Dortmund Data Bank =

- Producer: DDBST Gmbh (Germany)

Links
- Website: http://www.ddbst.com

The Dortmund Data Bank (short DDB) is a factual data bank for thermodynamic and thermophysical data. Its main usage is the data supply for process simulation where experimental data are the basis for the design, analysis, synthesis, and optimization of chemical processes. The DDB is used for fitting parameters for thermodynamic models like NRTL or UNIQUAC and for many different equations describing pure component properties, e.g., the Antoine equation for vapor pressures. The DDB is also used for the development and revision of predictive methods like UNIFAC and PSRK.

== Contents ==
=== Mixture properties ===
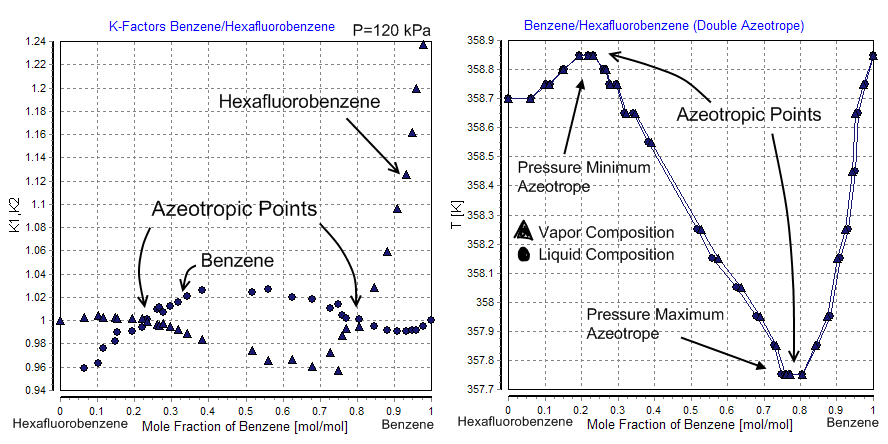
Double Azeotrope of Benzene and Hexafluorobenzene, taken from Dortmund Data Bank

- Phase equilibria data (vapor–liquid, liquid–liquid, solid–liquid), data on azeotropy and zeotropy
- Mixing enthalpies
- Gas solubilities
- Activity coefficients at infinite dilution
- Heat capacities and excess heat capacities
- Volumes, densities, and excess volumes (volume effect of mixing)
- Salt solubilities
- Octanol-water partition coefficients
- Critical data

The mixture data banks contain (as of April 2007) approx. 308,000 data sets with 2,157,000 data points for 10,750 components building 84,870 different binary, ternary, and higher systems/combinations.

=== Pure component properties ===
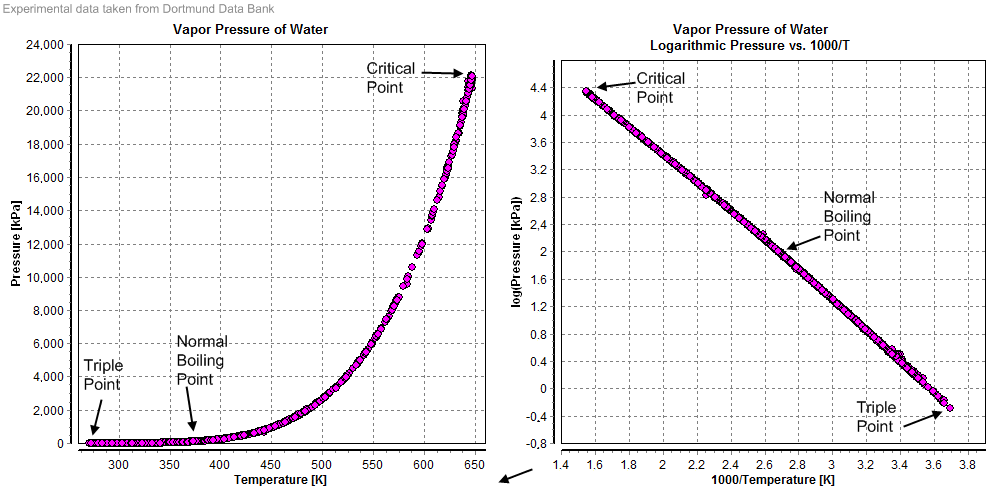
Vapor pressure diagrams of Water

- Saturated vapor pressures
- Saturated densities
- Viscosities
- Thermal conductivities
- Critical data (T_{c}, P_{c}, V_{c})
- Triple points
- Melting points
- Heat capacities
- Heats of fusion, sublimation and vaporization
- Heats of formation and combustion
- Heats and temperatures of transitions for solids
- Speed of sound
- P-v-T data including virial coefficients
- Energy functions
- Enthalpies and entropies
- Surface tensions

The pure component properties data bank contains (as of April 2007) approx. 157,000 data sets with 1,080,000 data points for 16,700 different components.

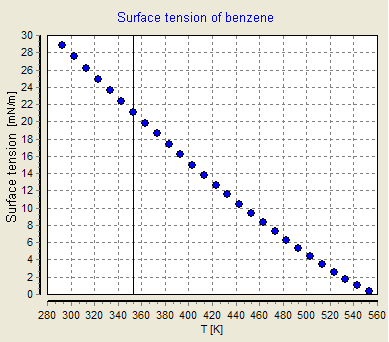
Surface tension of benzene

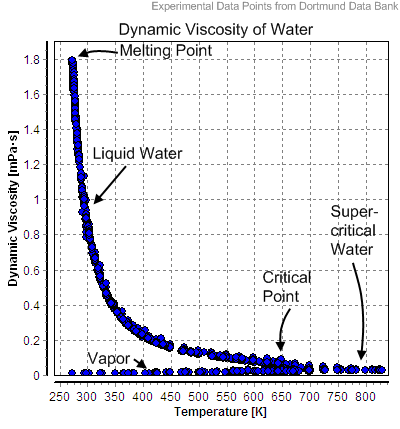
Dynamic viscosity of water

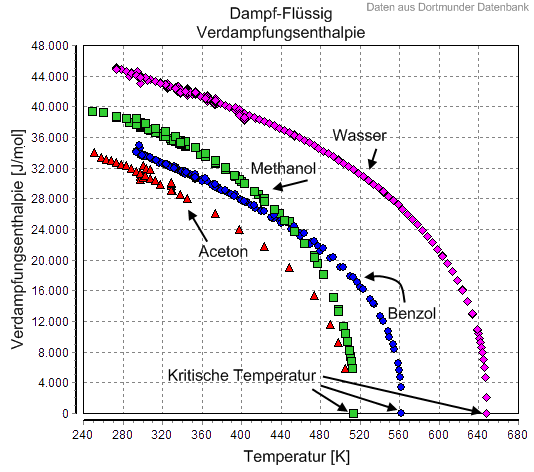
Heat of vaporization of water, methanol, benzene, and acetone

== Data sources ==
The DDB is a collection of experimental data published by the original authors. All data are referenced and a quite large literature data bank is part of the DDB, currently containing more than 92,000 articles, books, private communications, deposited documents from Russia (VINITI), Ukraine (Ukrniiti) and other former USSR states, company reports (mainly from former GDR companies), theses, patents, and conference contributions.

Secondary sources like data collections are normally neglected and only used as a literature source. Derived data are also not collected with the main exception of the azeotropic data bank which is built partly from evaluated vapor–liquid equilibrium data.

== History ==
The Dortmund Data Bank was founded in the 1970s at the University of Dortmund in Germany. The original reason for starting a vapor–liquid phase equilibria data collection was the development of the group contribution method UNIFAC which allows to estimate vapor pressures of mixtures.

The DDB has since been extended to many other properties and has increased dramatically in size also because of intensive (German) government aid. The funding has ended and the further development and maintenance is performed by DDBST GmbH, a company founded by members of the industrial chemistry chair of the Carl von Ossietzky University of Oldenburg, Germany.

Additional contributors are the DECHEMA, the FIZ CHEMIE (Berlin), the Technical University in Tallinn, and others.

== Availability ==
The Dortmund Data Bank is distributed by DDBST GmbH as in-house software. Many parts of the Dortmund Data Bank are also distributed as part of the DETHERM data bank which is also available online.

== See also ==
- Beilstein database
- Elektrolytdatenbank Regensburg
