= Outline of chemical engineering =

Overview of and topical guide to chemical engineering

The following outline is provided as an overview of and topical guide to chemical engineering:

Chemical engineering – deals with the application of physical science (e.g., chemistry and physics), and life sciences (e.g., biology, microbiology and biochemistry) with mathematics and economics, to the process of converting raw materials or chemicals into more useful or valuable forms. In addition to producing useful materials, modern chemical engineering is also concerned with pioneering valuable new materials and techniques – such as nanotechnology, fuel cells and biomedical engineering.

== Essence of chemical engineering ==
- Math
- Chemistry
- Physics
- Fluid Mechanics
- Chemical Reaction Engineering
- Thermodynamics
- Chemical Thermodynamics
- Engineering Mechanics
- Fluid Dynamics
- Heat Transfer
- Mass Transfer
- Transport Phenomena
- Green Chemistry and Sustainability
- Process Control
- Process Instrumentation
- Process Safety
- Unit Operation
- Process Design
- Chemical Process Modeling and Simulation
- Engineering Economics

== Branches of chemical engineering ==
- Biochemical engineering
- Biomedical engineering
- Biotechnology
- Ceramics
- Chemical process modeling
- Chemical Technologist
- Chemical reactor
- Chemical reaction engineering
- Distillation Design
- Electrochemistry
- Fluid dynamics
- Food engineering
- Heat transfer
- Mass transfer
- Materials science
- Microfluidics
- Nanotechnology
- Natural environment
- Plastics engineering
- Polymer engineering
- Process control
- Process design (chemical engineering)
- Separation processes (see also: separation of mixture)
  - Crystallization processes
  - Distillation processes
  - Membrane processes
- Semiconductors
- Thermodynamics
- Transport phenomena
- Unit operations
- Unit Operations of Chemical Engineering

== History of chemical engineering ==
History of chemical engineering

- Batch production

== General chemical engineering concepts ==
- Chemical engineer
- Chemical reaction
- Distillation Design
- Fluid mechanics
- Heat transfer
- Mass transfer and equilibrium stages
- Operations involving particulate solids.
- Process design
- Transport Phenomena
- Unit operations
- Polymerization
- 3D Plant Design
- FEED

== Leaders in chemical engineering ==
- List of chemical engineers

== See also ==
- Outline of chemistry
