= COCO simulator =

Simulation process modeling environment

The COCO Simulator is a free-of-charge, non-commercial, graphical, modular and CAPE-OPEN compliant, steady-state, sequential simulation process modeling environment. It was originally intended as a test environment for CAPE-OPEN modeling tools but now provides free chemical process simulation for students. It is an open flowsheet modeling environment allowing anyone to add new unit operations or thermodynamics packages.

The COCO Simulator uses a graphical representation, the Process Flow Diagram (PFD), for defining the process to be simulated. Clicking on a unit operation with the mouse allows the user to edit the unit operation parameters it defines via the CAPE-OPEN standard or to open the unit operation's own user interface, when available. This interoperability of process modeling software was enabled by the advent of the CAPE-OPEN standard. COCO thermodynamic library "TEA" and its chemical compound data bank are based on ChemSep LITE, a free equilibrium column simulator for distillation columns and liquid-liquid extractors. COCO's thermodynamic library exports more than 100 property calculation methods with their analytical or numerical derivatives. COCO includes a LITE version of COSMOtherm, an activity coefficient model based on Ab initio quantum chemistry methods. The simulator entails a set of unit-operations such as stream splitters/mixers, heat-exchangers, compressors, pumps and reactors. COCO features a reaction numerics package to power its simple conversion, equilibrium, CSTR, Gibbs minimization and plug flow reactor models.

== See also ==
- Process design (chemical engineering)
- List of Chemical Process Simulators
- Thermodynamic and thermophysical data
- Standard temperature and pressure
