= Process engineering =

Study of making products from raw materials

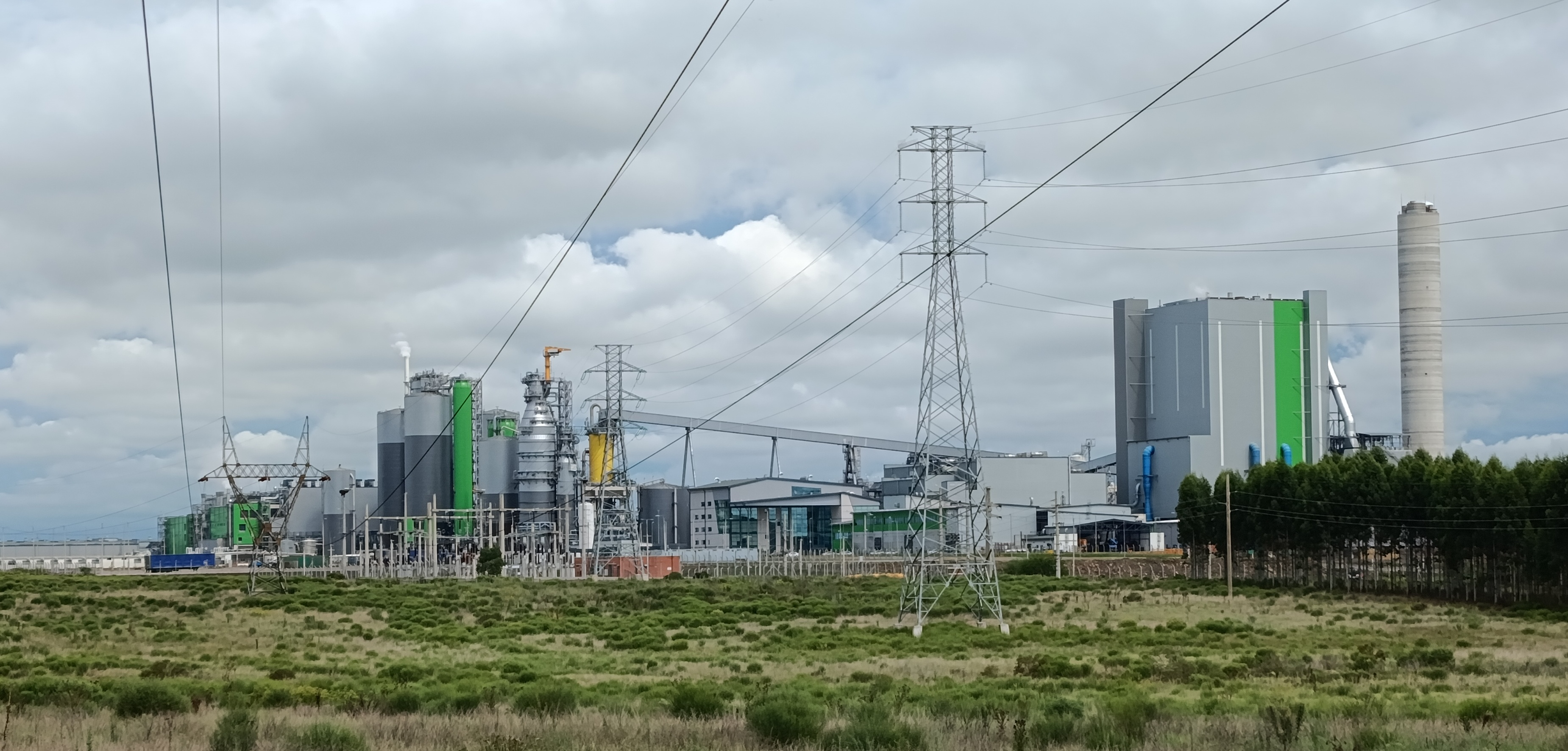
UPM pulp mill in Paso de los Toros, Uruguay, processes wood into cellulose paste for paper.

Process engineering is a field of study focused on the development and optimization of industrial processes. It consists of the understanding and application of the fundamental principles and laws of nature to allow humans to transform raw material and energy into products that are useful to society, at an industrial level. By taking advantage of the driving forces of nature such as pressure, temperature and concentration gradients, as well as the law of conservation of mass, process engineers can develop methods to synthesize and purify large quantities of desired chemical products. Process engineering focuses on the design, operation, control, optimization and intensification of chemical, physical, and biological processes. Their work involves analyzing the chemical makeup of various ingredients and determining how they might react with one another. A process engineer can specialize in a number of areas, including the following:

- Agriculture processing
- Food and dairy production
- Beer and whiskey production
- Cosmetics production
- Pharmaceutical production
- Petrochemical manufacturing
- Mineral processing
- Printed circuit board production

== Overview ==
Process engineering involves the utilization of multiple tools and methods. Depending on the exact nature of the system, processes need to be simulated and modeled using mathematics and computer science. Processes where phase change and phase equilibria are relevant require analysis using the principles and laws of thermodynamics to quantify changes in energy and efficiency. In contrast, processes that focus on the flow of material and energy as they approach equilibria are best analyzed using the disciplines of fluid mechanics and transport phenomena. Disciplines within the field of mechanics need to be applied in the presence of fluids or porous and dispersed media. Materials engineering principles also need to be applied, when relevant.

Manufacturing in the field of process engineering involves an implementation of process synthesis steps. Regardless of the exact tools required, process engineering is then formatted through the use of a process flow diagram (PFD) where material flow paths, storage equipment (such as tanks and silos), transformations (such as distillation columns, receiver/head tanks, mixing, separations, pumping, etc.) and flowrates are specified, as well as a list of all pipes and conveyors and their contents, material properties such as density, viscosity, particle-size distribution, flowrates, pressures, temperatures, and materials of construction for the piping and unit operations.

The process flow diagram is then used to develop a piping and instrumentation diagram (P&ID) which graphically displays the actual process occurring. P&ID are meant to be more complex and specific than a PFD. They represent a less muddled approach to the design. The P&ID is then used as a basis of design for developing the "system operation guide" or "functional design specification" which outlines the operation of the process. It guides the process through operation of machinery, safety in design, programming and effective communication between engineers.

From the P&ID, a proposed layout (general arrangement) of the process can be shown from an overhead view (plot plan) and a side view (elevation), and other engineering disciplines are involved such as civil engineers for site work (earth moving), foundation design, concrete slab design work, structural steel to support the equipment, etc. All previous work is directed toward defining the scope of the project, then developing a cost estimate to get the design installed, and a schedule to communicate the timing needs for engineering, procurement, fabrication, installation, commissioning, startup, and ongoing production of the process.

Depending on needed accuracy of the cost estimate and schedule that is required, several iterations of designs are generally provided to customers or stakeholders who feed back their requirements. The process engineer incorporates these additional instructions (scope revisions) into the overall design and additional cost estimates, and schedules are developed for funding approval. Following funding approval, the project is executed via project management.

== Principal areas of focus in process engineering ==
Process engineering activities can be divided into the following disciplines:

- Process design: synthesis of energy recovery networks, synthesis of distillation systems (azeotropic), synthesis of reactor networks, hierarchical decomposition flowsheets, superstructure optimization, design multiproduct batch plants, design of the production reactors for the production of plutonium, design of nuclear submarines.
- Process control: model predictive control, controllability measures, robust control, nonlinear control, statistical process control, process monitoring, thermodynamics-based control, denoted by three essential items, a collection of measurements, method of taking measurements, and a system of controlling the desired measurement.
- Process operations: scheduling process networks, multiperiod planning and optimization, data reconciliation, real-time optimization, flexibility measures, fault diagnosis.
- Supporting tools: sequential modular simulation, equation-based process simulation, AI/expert systems, large-scale nonlinear programming (NLP), optimization of differential algebraic equations (DAEs), mixed-integer nonlinear programming (MINLP), global optimization, optimization under uncertainty, and quality function deployment (QFD).
- Process Economics: This includes using simulation software such as ASPEN, Super-Pro to find out the break even point, net present value, marginal sales, marginal cost, return on investment of the industrial plant after the analysis of the heat and mass transfer of the plant.
- Process Data Analytics: Applying data analytics and machine learning methods for process manufacturing problems.

== History of process engineering ==
Various chemical techniques have been used in industrial processes since time immemorial. However, it wasn't until the advent of thermodynamics and the law of conservation of mass in the 1780s that process engineering was properly developed and implemented as its own discipline. The body of knowledge that is now known as process engineering was then forged out of trial and error throughout the industrial revolution.

The term process, as it relates to industry and production, dates back to the 18th century. During this time period, demands for various products began to drastically increase, and process engineers were required to optimize the process in which these products were created.

By 1980, the concept of process engineering emerged from the fact that chemical engineering techniques and practices were being used in a variety of industries. By this time, process engineering had been defined as "the set of knowledge necessary to design, analyze, develop, construct, and operate, in an optimal way, the processes in which the material changes". By the end of the 20th century, process engineering had expanded from chemical engineering-based technologies to other applications, including metallurgical engineering, agricultural engineering, and product engineering.

== See also ==
- Chemical process modeling
- Chemical technologist
- Industrial engineering
- Industrial process
- Low-gravity process engineering
- Materials science
- Modular process skid
- Process chemistry
- Process flowsheeting
- Process integration
- Process safety
- Systems engineering process
