= Techno-economic assessment =

Method of analyzing the economic performance of an industrial process

Techno-economic assessment or techno-economic analysis (abbreviated TEA) is a method of analyzing the economic performance of an industrial process, product, or service. The methodology originates from earlier work on combining technical, economic and risk assessments for chemical production processes. It typically uses software modeling to estimate capital cost, operating cost, and revenue based on technical and financial input parameters. One desired outcome is to summarize results in a concise and visually coherent form, using visualization tools such as tornado diagrams and sensitivity analysis graphs.

At present, TEA is most commonly used to analyze technologies in the chemical, bioprocess, petroleum, energy, and similar industries. This article focuses on these areas of application.

== Use cases ==
TEA can be used for studying new technologies or optimizing existing ones. Ideally, a techno-economic model represents the best current understanding of the system being modeled. The following are examples of typical uses.

- Evaluating economic feasibility: TEA can be used to anticipate whether a process will be sufficiently profitable under a certain set of assumptions. It can thereby help companies to avoid pursuing dead-ends.
- Guiding research and development: When combined with sensitivity analyses like Tornado Diagrams, TEA can be used to identify research and development (R&D) targets with the greatest potential to improve profitability. In this way, it can help companies bring their technologies to market more efficiently.
- Quantifying uncertainty and risk: Sensitivity analyses like Tornado Diagrams and Monte Carlo analysis can be used to quantify economic uncertainty in the model results. They can also be used to identify which variables are the source of the most uncertainty.

== Methodology ==
Techno-economic analyses are usually performed using a techno-economic model. A techno-economic model is an integrated process and cost model. It combines elements of process design, process modeling, equipment sizing, capital cost estimation, and operating cost estimation.

=== Process design ===
To begin with, the system is defined in the form of a process flow diagram (PFD). A typical PFD shows major equipment and material streams. The term ‘material stream’ refers to liquids, solids, or gases entering or exiting the system, or flowing from one piece of equipment to another.

=== Process modeling ===
The process model uses engineering and material balance calculations to more fully characterize the system being analyzed. The results are often summarized in the form of a material balance table or stream table, which corresponds to the PFD.

=== Equipment sizing ===
The output from the process model is used to:

1. Estimate sizing parameters for each piece of equipment (i.e. one or more parameters that correlate with cost)
2. Estimate utility requirements for each piece of equipment (i.e. electrical power, fuel, cooling water, etc.)

=== Capital cost estimation ===
Capital costs are typically estimated using a major equipment factored approach. First, the purchase cost for each piece of equipment is estimated from the results of the equipment sizing calculations, often using power law scaling relationships. Next, the balance of the capital costs are estimated by applying multiplying factors based on similar systems.

=== Operating cost estimation ===
Typical operating costs include raw materials, operating labor, waste treatment, and disposal, utilities, and overhead. Raw material and waste treatment costs are estimated by applying prices to raw material and waste flow rates from the process model. Similarly, utility costs are estimated by applying prices to the utility rates from equipment sizing.

Operating labor can be estimated based on equipment size, quantity, and type. Overhead is typically estimated by applying heuristic factors to capital costs and operating labor.

=== Cash flow analysis ===
Techno-economic models may also include a discounted cash flow analysis to calculate metrics like net present value and internal rate of return. A cash flow analysis will typically incorporate financial parameters like taxes and discount rates.

== Platforms ==
TEA is typically performed using one of two platforms: spreadsheet software, like Microsoft Excel, or a process simulator, like AVEVA Process Simulation, Aspen, SuperPro Designer, integrated tools such as thecubeSphere, or open source software such as the python-based BioSTEAM. In general, these platforms use the methodology described above.

Spreadsheet modeling is often preferred for early-stage technologies and startups since it tends to offer greater flexibility, accessibility, and transparency. Process simulators, on the other hand, offer more powerful process simulation capabilities, greater standardization, and integrated cost-estimation modules.

More recently, researchers have demonstrated that machine learning models can be trained on simulation outputs to produce so-called surrogate models capable of predicting costs, mass balances, and energy balances.

== Accuracy ==
Assuming a complete process design, the major equipment factored approach that is often used in TEA has an expected accuracy of -30% to +50%. In the early stages of development, however, the process design is often incomplete or inaccurate, so the error bounds are often considerably larger. Examples of how uncertainty is managed in process modeling and economic analysis of early stage technologies can be found for materials used in long duration energy storage and hydrogen storage.

== Resources ==
Educational material

- AssesCCUS from University of Michigan

Online tools

- The Bioprocess TEA Calculator
- CatCost
- BioC2G
- Downstream Processing (DSP) Designer
- JBEI TEA Model Library

Integrated tools (TEA, LCA, Risk Assessment, Process Modelling)

- thecubeSphere

Guidelines

- Techno-Economic Assessment Guidelines for CO_{2} Utilization
- Technoeconomic analysis for biofuels and bioproducts
