= List of National Medal of Science laureates =

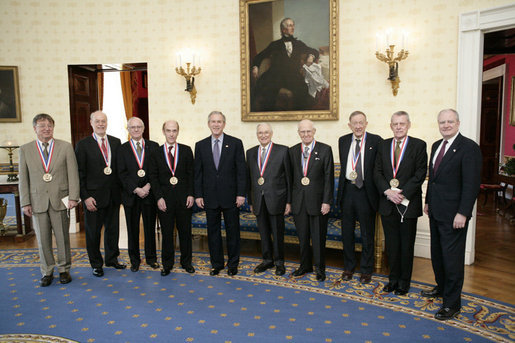
President George W. Bush (5th from left) and Dr. John Marburger (far right), director of the White House Office of Science and Technology, pose with the recipients of National Medal of Science, Monday, Feb. 13, 2004, in the White House. From left to right are Dr. Dennis Sullivan, Dr. Phillip Allen Sharp, Dr. Robert N. Clayton, Dr. Stephen J. Lippard, Dr. Kenneth Arrow, Dr. Norman Borlaug, Dr. Edwin N. Lightfoot and Dr. Thomas Starzl.

The National Medal of Science is an honor bestowed by the President of the United States to individuals in science and engineering who have made important contributions to the advancement of knowledge in the following six fields: behavioral and social sciences, biology, chemistry, engineering, mathematics and physical sciences. The Committee on the National Medal of Science under the National Science Foundation (NSF) is responsible for recommending medal candidates to the President.

== Behavioral and social science ==
- 1964—Neal E. Miller
- 1986—Herbert A. Simon
- 1987—Anne Anastasi, George Stigler
- 1988—Milton Friedman
- 1990—Leonid Hurwicz, Patrick Suppes
- 1991—George Armitage Miller
- 1992—Eleanor J. Gibson
- 1994—Robert K. Merton
- 1995—Roger Shepard
- 1996—Paul Samuelson
- 1997—William Kaye Estes
- 1998—William Julius Wilson
- 1999—Robert Solow
- 2000—Gary Becker
- 2003—R. Duncan Luce
- 2004—Kenneth Arrow
- 2005—Gordon H. Bower
- 2008—Michael Posner
- 2009—Mortimer Mishkin
- 2011—Anne Treisman
- 2012—Robert Axelrod
- 2014—Albert Bandura
- 2022—Huda Akil, Shelley E. Taylor
- 2024—Larry Martin Bartels

== Biological sciences ==
- 1963—C. B. van Niel
- 1964—Theodosius Dobzhansky, Marshall Warren Nirenberg
- 1965—Francis Peyton Rous, George Gaylord Simpson, Donald Van Slyke
- 1966—Edward F. Knipling, Fritz Albert Lipmann, William Cumming Rose, Sewall Wright
- 1967—Kenneth Stewart Cole, Harry Harlow, Michael Heidelberger, Alfred Sturtevant
- 1968—Horace Barker, Bernard Beryl Brodie, Detlev Bronk, Jay Laurence Lush, B. F. Skinner
- 1969—Robert Huebner, Ernst Mayr
- 1970—Barbara McClintock, Albert Sabin
- 1973—Daniel I. Arnon, Earl Wilbur Sutherland Jr.
- 1974—Britton Chance, Erwin Chargaff, James V. Neel, James A. Shannon
- 1975—Hallowell Davis, Paul Gyorgy, Sterling B. Hendricks, Orville Vogel
- 1976—Roger Guillemin, Keith R. Porter, Efraim Racker, E. O. Wilson
- 1979—Robert H. Burris, Elizabeth C. Crosby, Arthur Kornberg, Severo Ochoa, Earl Reece Stadtman, G. Ledyard Stebbins, Paul Alfred Weiss
- 1981—Philip Handler
- 1982—Seymour Benzer, Glenn W. Burton, Mildred Cohn
- 1983—Howard Bachrach, Paul Berg, Wendell L. Roelofs, Berta Scharrer
- 1986—Stanley Cohen, Donald Henderson, Vernon Benjamin Mountcastle, George Emil Palade, Joan A. Steitz
- 1987—Michael DeBakey, Theodor Otto Diener, Harry Eagle, Har Gobind Khorana, Rita Levi-Montalcini
- 1988—Michael Stuart Brown, Stanley Norman Cohen, Joseph L. Goldstein, Maurice Hilleman, Eric Kandel, Rosalyn Sussman Yalow
- 1989—Katherine Esau, Viktor Hamburger, Philip Leder, Joshua Lederberg, Roger Wolcott Sperry, Harland G. Wood
- 1990—Baruj Benacerraf, Herbert Boyer, Daniel E. Koshland Jr., Edward B. Lewis, David G. Nathan, E. Donnall Thomas
- 1991—Mary Ellen Avery, G. Evelyn Hutchinson, Elvin A. Kabat, Robert Kates, Salvador Luria, Paul Marks, Folke K. Skoog, Paul Zamecnik
- 1992—Maxine Singer, Howard Martin Temin
- 1993—Daniel Nathans, Salome Gluecksohn-Waelsch
- 1994—Thomas Eisner, Elizabeth F. Neufeld
- 1995—Alexander Rich
- 1996—Ruth Patrick
- 1997—James Watson, Robert Weinberg
- 1998—Bruce Ames, Janet Rowley
- 1999—David Baltimore, Jared Diamond, Lynn Margulis
- 2000—Nancy Coover Andreasen, Peter H. Raven, Carl Woese
- 2001—Francisco J. Ayala, George Bass, Mario Capecchi, Ann Graybiel, Gene Likens, Victor A. McKusick, Harold E. Varmus
- 2002—James E. Darnell, Evelyn M. Witkin
- 2003—J. Michael Bishop, Solomon H. Snyder, Charles Yanofsky
- 2004—Norman Borlaug, Phillip Allen Sharp, Thomas Starzl
- 2005—Anthony Fauci, Torsten Wiesel
- 2006—Rita R. Colwell, Nina Fedoroff, Lubert Stryer
- 2007—Robert Lefkowitz, Bert W. O'Malley
- 2008—Francis Collins, Elaine Fuchs, Craig Venter
- 2009—Susan Lindquist, Stanley B. Prusiner
- 2010—Ralph L. Brinster, Rudolf Jaenisch
- 2011—Lucy Shapiro, Leroy Hood, Sallie W. Chisholm
- 2012—May Berenbaum, Bruce Alberts
- 2013—Rakesh Jain
- 2014—Stanley Falkow, Mary-Claire King, Simon A. Levin
- 2022—Gebisa Ejeta, Eve Marder, Gregory Petsko, Sheldon Weinbaum
- 2024—Bonnie L. Bassler, Angela Marie Belcher, Helen M. Blau, Emery Neal Brown, G. David Tilman, Teresa Kaye Woodruff

== Chemistry ==
- 1964—Roger Adams
- 1982—F. Albert Cotton, Gilbert Stork
- 1983—Roald Hoffmann, George C. Pimentel, Richard Zare
- 1986—Harry B. Gray, Yuan T. Lee, Carl Shipp Marvel, Frank Westheimer
- 1987—William Summer Johnson, Walter H. Stockmayer, Max Tishler
- 1988—William O. Baker, Konrad Emil Bloch, Elias James Corey
- 1989—Richard Barry Bernstein, Melvin Calvin, Rudolph A. Marcus, Harden M. McConnell
- 1990—Elkan Blout, Karl August Folkers, John D. Roberts
- 1991—Ronald Breslow, Gertrude B. Elion, Dudley R. Herschbach, Glenn T. Seaborg
- 1992—Howard Ensign Simmons Jr.
- 1993—Donald J. Cram, Norman Hackerman
- 1994—George S. Hammond
- 1995—Thomas Cech, Isabella Karle
- 1996—Norman Davidson
- 1997—Darleane C. Hoffman, Harold S. Johnston
- 1998—John W. Cahn, George M. Whitesides
- 1999—Stuart A. Rice, John Ross, Susan Solomon
- 2000—John D. Baldeschwieler, Ralph F. Hirschmann
- 2001—Ernest R. Davidson, Gábor A. Somorjai
- 2002—John Isaiah Brauman
- 2004—Stephen J. Lippard
- 2005—Tobin J. Marks
- 2006—Marvin H. Caruthers, Peter Dervan
- 2007—Mostafa El-Sayed
- 2008—Joanna Fowler, JoAnne Stubbe
- 2009—Stephen J. Benkovic, Marye Anne Fox
- 2010—Jacqueline Barton, Peter J. Stang
- 2011—Allen J. Bard, M. Frederick Hawthorne
- 2012—Judith Klinman, Jerrold Meinwald
- 2013—Geraldine L. Richmond
- 2014—Paul Alivisatos
- 2024—R. Lawrence Edwards

== Engineering sciences ==
- 1962—Theodore von Kármán
- 1963—Vannevar Bush, John R. Pierce
- 1964—Othmar Ammann, Charles Stark Draper
- 1965—Hugh Latimer Dryden, Kelly Johnson, Warren K. Lewis
- 1966—Claude Shannon
- 1967—Edwin H. Land, Igor Sikorsky
- 1968—J. Presper Eckert, Nathan M. Newmark
- 1969—Jack Kilby
- 1970—George Mueller
- 1973—Doc Edgerton, Richard T. Whitcomb
- 1974—Rudolf Kompfner, Ralph Brazelton Peck, Abel Wolman
- 1975—Manson Benedict, Bill Pickering, Frederick Terman, Wernher von Braun
- 1976—Morris Cohen, Peter Carl Goldmark, Erwin Wilhelm Müller
- 1979—Emmett Leith, Raymond D. Mindlin, Robert Noyce, Earl R. Parker, Simon Ramo
- 1982—Ed Heinemann, Donald L. Katz
- 1983—Bill Hewlett, George Low, John G. Trump
- 1986—Hans W. Liepmann, Tung-Yen Lin, Bernard M. Oliver
- 1987—Robert Byron Bird, Harry Bolton Seed, Ernst Weber
- 1988—Daniel C. Drucker, Willis Hawkins, George W. Housner
- 1989—Harry George Drickamer, Herbert E. Grier
- 1990—Mildred Dresselhaus, Nick Holonyak
- 1991—George H. Heilmeier, Luna Leopold, Guyford Stever
- 1992—Calvin Quate, John Roy Whinnery
- 1993—Alfred Y. Cho
- 1994—Ray William Clough
- 1995—Hermann A. Haus
- 1996—James L. Flanagan, C. Kumar N. Patel
- 1998—Eli Ruckenstein
- 1999—Kenneth N. Stevens
- 2000—Yuan-Cheng Fung
- 2001—Andreas Acrivos
- 2002—Leo Beranek
- 2003—John Prausnitz
- 2004—Edwin N. Lightfoot
- 2005—Jan D. Achenbach
- 2006—Robert S. Langer
- 2007—David J. Wineland, Andrew Viterbi
- 2008—Rudolf E. Kálmán
- 2009—Amnon Yariv
- 2010—Shu Chien
- 2011—John B. Goodenough
- 2012—Thomas Kailath
- 2022—Subra Suresh
- 2024—John O. Dabiri
- 2026—Lisa Su, Sergey Brin, Elon Musk, Jensen Huang

== Mathematical, statistical, and computer sciences ==
- 1963—Norbert Wiener
- 1964—Solomon Lefschetz, Marston Morse
- 1965—Oscar Zariski
- 1966—John Milnor
- 1967—Paul Cohen
- 1968—Jerzy Neyman
- 1969—William Feller
- 1970—Richard Brauer
- 1973—John Tukey
- 1974—Kurt Gödel
- 1975—John Backus, Shiing-Shen Chern, George Dantzig
- 1976—Kurt Otto Friedrichs, Hassler Whitney
- 1979—Joseph L. Doob, Donald Knuth
- 1982—Marshall H. Stone
- 1983—Herman Goldstine, Isadore Singer
- 1986—Peter Lax, Antoni Zygmund
- 1987—Raoul Bott, Michael Freedman
- 1988—Ralph E. Gomory, Joseph Keller
- 1989—Samuel Karlin, Saunders Mac Lane, Donald C. Spencer
- 1990—George F. Carrier, Stephen Cole Kleene, John McCarthy
- 1991—Alberto Calderón
- 1992—Allen Newell
- 1993—Martin David Kruskal
- 1994—John Cocke
- 1995—Louis Nirenberg
- 1996—Richard M. Karp, Stephen Smale
- 1997—Shing-Tung Yau
- 1998—Cathleen Synge Morawetz
- 1999—Felix Browder, Ronald Coifman
- 2000—John G. Thompson, Karen Uhlenbeck
- 2001—C. R. Rao, Elias M. Stein
- 2002—James Glimm
- 2003—Carl R. de Boor
- 2004—Dennis Sullivan
- 2005—Bradley Efron
- 2006—Hyman Bass
- 2007—Leonard Kleinrock
- 2009—David Mumford
- 2010—Richard A. Tapia, S. R. Srinivasa Varadhan
- 2011—Solomon W. Golomb, Barry Mazur
- 2012—Alexandre Chorin, posthumous David Blackwell
- 2013—Michael Artin
- 2024—Ingrid Daubechies, Cynthia Dwork

== Physical sciences ==
- 1963—Luis Walter Alvarez
- 1964—Julian Schwinger, Harold Urey, Robert Burns Woodward
- 1965—John Bardeen, Peter Debye, Leon M. Lederman, William Walden Rubey
- 1966—Jacob Bjerknes, Subrahmanyan Chandrasekhar, Henry Eyring, John Hasbrouck Van Vleck, Vladimir K. Zworykin
- 1967—Jesse Beams, Francis Birch, Gregory Breit, Louis Plack Hammett, George Kistiakowsky
- 1968—Paul Doughty Bartlett, Herbert Friedman, Lars Onsager, Eugene Wigner
- 1969—Herbert C. Brown, Pief Panofsky
- 1970—Robert H. Dicke, Allan Sandage, John C. Slater, John Archibald Wheeler, Saul Winstein
- 1973—Carl Djerassi, Maurice Ewing, Arie Jan Haagen-Smit, Vladimir Haensel, Frederick Seitz, Robert R. Wilson
- 1974—Nicolaas Bloembergen, Paul Flory, William Alfred Fowler, Linus Pauling, Kenneth Pitzer
- 1975—Hans Bethe, Joseph O. Hirschfelder, Lewis Hastings Sarett, Edgar Bright Wilson, Chien-Shiung Wu
- 1976—Samuel Goudsmit, Herbert S. Gutowsky, Frederick Rossini, Verner E. Suomi, Henry Taube, George Uhlenbeck
- 1979—Richard Feynman, Herman Francis Mark, Edward Mills Purcell, John H. Sinfelt, Lyman Spitzer, Victor Weisskopf
- 1982—Philip W. Anderson, Yoichiro Nambu, Edward Teller, Charles H. Townes
- 1983—Margaret Burbidge, Maurice Goldhaber, Helmut Landsberg, Walter Munk, Frederick Reines, Bruno Rossi, John Robert Schrieffer
- 1986—Solomon J. Buchsbaum, H. Richard Crane, Herman Feshbach, Robert Hofstadter, Yang Chen-Ning
- 1987—Philip Abelson, Walter M. Elsasser, Paul Lauterbur, George Pake, James Van Allen
- 1988—D. Allan Bromley, Paul Ching Wu Chu, Walter Kohn, Norman Ramsey Jr., Jack Steinberger
- 1989—Arnold Beckman, Eugene Parker, Robert P. Sharp, Henry Stommel
- 1990—Allan MacLeod Cormack, Edwin McMillan, Robert Pound, Roger Revelle
- 1991—Arthur Leonard Schawlow, Edward C. Stone, Steven Weinberg
- 1992—Eugene Merle Shoemaker
- 1993—Val Logsdon Fitch, Vera Rubin
- 1994—Albert Overhauser, Frank Press
- 1995—Hans Georg Dehmelt, Peter Goldreich
- 1996—Wallace Smith Broecker
- 1997—Marshall Rosenbluth, Martin Schwarzschild, George Wetherill
- 1998—Don L. Anderson, John N. Bahcall
- 1999—James Cronin, Leo Kadanoff
- 2000—Willis Lamb, Jeremiah P. Ostriker, Gilbert F. White
- 2001—Marvin L. Cohen, Raymond Davis Jr., Charles David Keeling
- 2002—Richard Garwin, W. Jason Morgan, Edward Witten
- 2003—Brent Dalrymple, Riccardo Giacconi
- 2004—Robert N. Clayton
- 2005—Ralph Asher Alpher, Lonnie Thompson
- 2006—Daniel Kleppner
- 2007—Fay Ajzenberg-Selove, Charles Pence Slichter
- 2008—Berni Alder, James Gunn
- 2009—Yakir Aharonov, Esther M. Conwell, Warren M. Washington
- 2011—Sidney Drell, Sandra Faber, Sylvester James Gates
- 2012—Burton Richter, Sean Solomon
- 2014—Shirley Ann Jackson
- 2022—Barry Barish, Myriam Sarachik
- 2024—Richard B. Alley, Wendy L. Freedman, Keivan G. Stassun
