= Process design =

Process design in chemical engineering

In chemical engineering, process design is the choice and sequencing of units for desired physical and/or chemical transformation of materials. Process design is central to chemical engineering, and it can be considered to be the summit of that field, bringing together all of the field's components.

Process design can be the design of new facilities or it can be the modification or expansion of existing facilities. The design starts at a conceptual level and ultimately ends in the form of fabrication and construction plans.

Process design is distinct from equipment design, which is closer in spirit to the design of unit operations. Processes often include many unit operations.

== Documentation ==
Process design documents serve to define the design and they ensure that the design components fit together. They are useful in communicating ideas and plans to other engineers involved with the design, to external regulatory agencies, to equipment vendors, and to construction contractors.

In order of increasing detail, process design documents include:

- Block flow diagrams (BFD): Very simple diagrams composed of rectangles and lines indicating major material or energy flows.
- Process flow diagrams (PFD): Typically more complex diagrams of major unit operations as well as flow lines. They usually include a material balance, and sometimes an energy balance, showing typical or design flowrates, stream compositions, and stream and equipment pressures and temperatures. It is the key document in process design.
- Piping and instrumentation diagrams (P&ID): Diagrams showing each and every pipeline with piping class (carbon steel or stainless steel) and pipe size (diameter). They also show valving along with instrument locations and process control schemes.
- Specifications: Written design requirements of all major equipment items.

Process designers typically write operating manuals on how to start-up, operate and shut-down the process. They often also develop accident plans and projections of process operation on the environment.

Documents are maintained after construction of the process facility for the operating personnel to refer to. The documents also are useful when modifications to the facility are planned.

A primary method of developing the process documents is process flowsheeting.

== Design considerations ==
Design conceptualization and considerations can begin once objectives are defined and constraints identified.

Objectives that a design may strive to meet include:

- Throughput rate
- Process yield
- Product purity

Constraints include:

- Capital cost: investment required to implement the design including cost of new equipment and disposal of obsolete equipment.
- Available space: the area of land or room in building to place new or modified equipment.
- Safety concerns: risk of accidents and posed by hazardous materials.
- Environmental impact and projected effluents, emissions, and waste production.
- Operating and maintenance costs.

Other factors that designers may include are:

- Reliability
- Redundancy
- Flexibility
- Anticipated variability in feed stock and allowable variability in product.

== Sources of design information ==
Designers usually do not start from scratch, especially for complex projects. Often the engineers have pilot plant data available or data from full-scale operating facilities. Other sources of information include proprietary design criteria provided by process licensors, published scientific data, laboratory experiments, and suppliers of feedstocks and utilities.

== Design process ==
Design starts with process synthesis - the choice of technology and combinations of industrial units to achieve goals. More detailed design proceeds as other engineers and stakeholders sign off on each stage: conceptual to detailed design.

Simulation software is often used by design engineers. Simulations can identify weaknesses in designs and allow engineers to choose better alternatives. However, engineers still rely on heuristics, intuition, and experience when designing a process. Human creativity is an element in complex designs.

== See also ==
- Chemical engineer
- Chemical plant
- Chemical process
- Process integration
- Process simulation
- Chemical process modeling
- Environmental engineering
- Industrial process
- List of chemical process simulators
- Process engineering
- Process safety
- Unit process

== Recommended chemical engineering books ==
- Sinnott and Towler (2009). Chemical Engineering Design: Principles, Practice and Economics of Plant and Process Design (5th ed.). Butterworth-Heinemann. ISBN 978-0750685511.
- Ullmann's (2004). Chemical Engineering and Plant Design. Wiley-VCH. ISBN 978-3-527-31111-8.
- Moran, Sean (2015). An Applied Guide to Process and Plant Design (1st ed.). Butterworth-Heinemann. ISBN 978-0128002421.
- Moran, Sean (2016). Process Plant Layout (2nd ed.). Butterworth-Heinemann. ISBN 978-0128033555.
- Peter, Frank (2008). Process Plant Design. Wiley. ISBN 9783527313136.
- Kister, Henry Z. (1992). Distillation Design (1st ed.). McGraw-Hill. ISBN 0-07-034909-6.
- Perry, Robert H. & Green, Don W. (1984). Perry's Chemical Engineers' Handbook (6th ed.). McGraw-Hill. ISBN 0-07-049479-7.
- Bird, R.B., Stewart, W.E. and Lightfoot, E.N. (August 2001). Transport Phenomena (Second ed.). John Wiley & Sons. ISBN 0-471-41077-2.
- McCabe, W., Smith, J. and Harriott, P. (2004). Unit Operations of Chemical Engineering (7th ed.). McGraw Hill. ISBN 0-07-284823-5.
- Seader, J. D. & Henley, Ernest J. (1998). Separation Process Principles. New York: Wiley. ISBN 0-471-58626-9.
- Chopey, Nicholas P. (2004). Handbook of Chemical Engineering Calculations (3rdEdition ed.). McGraw-Hill. ISBN 0-07-136262-2.
- Himmelbau, David M. (1996). Basic Principles and Calculations in Chemical Engineering (6th ed.). Prentice-Hall. ISBN 0-13-305798-4.
- Editors: Jacqueline I. Kroschwitz and Arza Seidel (2004). Kirk-Othmer Encyclopedia of Chemical Technology (5th ed.). Hoboken, NJ: Wiley-Interscience. ISBN 0-471-48810-0.
- King, C.J. (1980). Separation Processes (2nd ed.). McGraw Hill. ISBN 0-07-034612-7.
- Peters, M. S. & Timmerhaus K. D. (1991). Plant Design and Economics for Chemical Engineers (4th ed.). McGraw Hill. ISBN 0-07-100871-3.
- J. M. Smith, H. C. Van Ness and M. M. Abott (2001). Introduction to Chemical Engineering Thermodynamics (6th ed.). McGraw Hill. ISBN 0-07-240296-2.
