= DWSIM =

Chemical process simulation software

- DWSIM logo
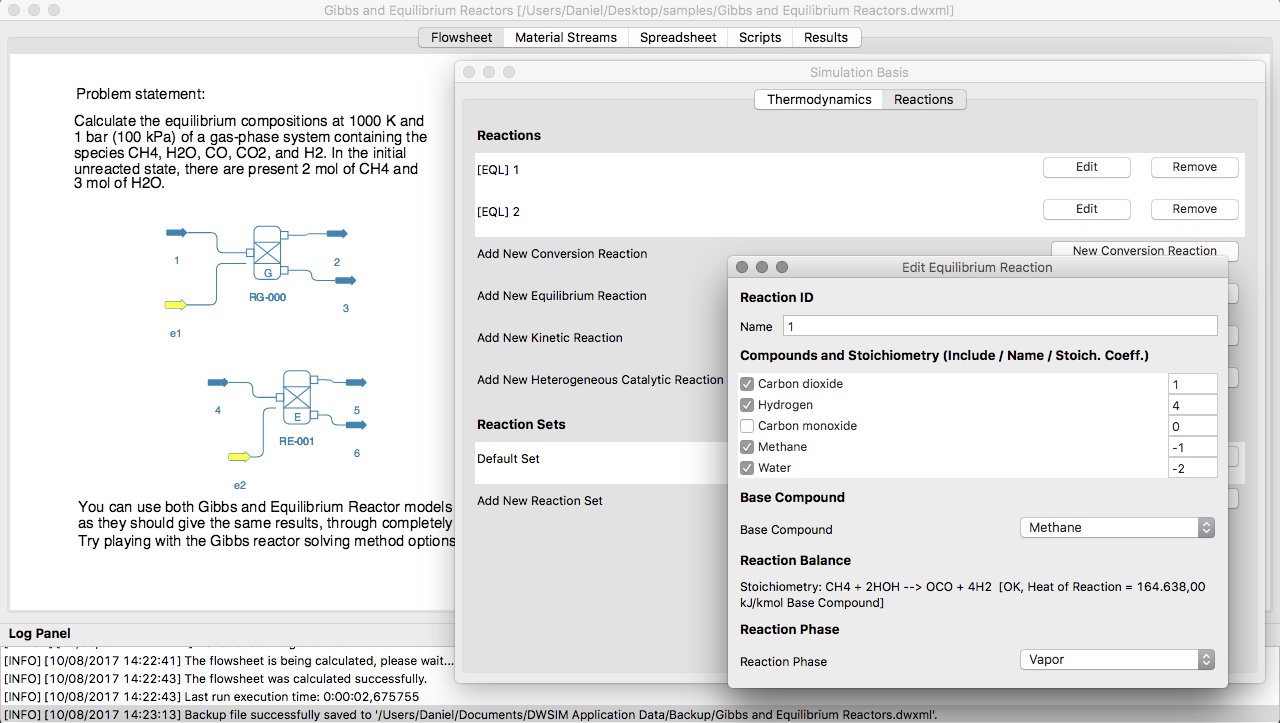
- DWSIM running on macOS
- Developer(s): Daniel Medeiros
- Initial release: July 9, 2008; 17 years ago
- Stable release: 8.7.0 (Windows/Linux/macOS) / March 22, 2024; 15 months ago 5.0.0 (iOS) / March 20, 2024; 16 months ago 5.0.0 (Android) / March 20, 2024; 16 months ago
- Repository: github.com/DanWBR/dwsim sourceforge.net/projects/dwsim/
- Written in: Visual Basic .NET, C#
- Operating system: Windows, Linux, macOS, Android, iOS
- Platform: .NET, Mono
- Available in: English, Brazilian Portuguese
- Type: Chemical process modeling
- License: GNU General Public License/GNU Lesser General Public License (Windows/Linux/macOS), Freemium (Android/iOS)
- Website: https://dwsim.org

DWSIM is an open-source CAPE-OPEN compliant chemical process simulator for Windows, Linux and macOS. DWSIM is built on top of the Microsoft .NET and Mono Platforms and features a graphical user interface (GUI), advanced thermodynamics calculations, reactions support and petroleum characterization / hypothetical component generation tools.

DWSIM is able to simulate steady-state, vapor–liquid, vapor–liquid-liquid, solid–liquid and aqueous electrolyte equilibrium processes with the following Thermodynamic Models and Unit Operations:

- Thermodynamic models: CoolProp, Peng–Robinson equation of state, Peng–Robinson-Strÿjek-Vera (PRSV2), Soave–Redlich–Kwong, Lee-Kesler, Lee-Kesler-Plöcker, UNIFAC(-LL), Modified UNIFAC (Dortmund), Modified UNIFAC (NIST), UNIQUAC, NRTL, Chao-Seader, Grayson-Streed, Extended UNIQUAC, Raoult's Law, IAPWS-IF97 Steam Tables, IAPWS-08 Seawater, Black-Oil and Sour Water;
- Unit operations: CAPE-OPEN Socket, Spreadsheet, Custom (IronPython Script), Mixer, Splitter, Separator, Pump, Compressor, Expander, Heater, Cooler, Valve, Pipe Segment, Shortcut Column, Heat exchanger, Reactors (Conversion, PFR, CSTR, Equilibrium and Gibbs), Distillation column, Simple, Refluxed and Reboiled Absorbers, Component Separator, Solids Separator, Continuous Cake Filter and Orifice plate;
- Utilities: Binary Data Regression, Phase Envelope, Natural Gas Hydrates, Pure Component Properties, True Critical Point, PSV Sizing, Vessel Sizing, Spreadsheet and Petroleum Cold Flow Properties;
- Tools: Hypothetical Component Generator, Bulk C7+/Distillation Curves Petroleum Characterization, Petroleum Assay Manager, Reactions Manager and Compound Creator;
- Process Analysis and Optimization: Sensitivity Analysis Utility, Multivariate Optimizer with bound constraints;
- Extras: Support for Runtime Python Scripts, Plugins and CAPE-OPEN Flowsheet Monitoring Objects.

== Android and iOS versions ==
DWSIM is also available on Android and iOS, where it is free to download. On these platforms, DWSIM includes a basic set of features while more advanced modules can be unlocked through in-app purchases.

== Raspberry Pi version ==
A special DWSIM build is available for Raspberry Pi 2/3 devices running an armhf-based Linux distribution like Raspbian and Ubuntu MATE.

== See also ==
- Process design (chemical engineering)
- List of Chemical Process Simulators
- Standard temperature and pressure
