= Process flowsheeting =

Process flowsheeting is the use of computer aids to perform steady-state heat and mass balancing, sizing and costing calculations for a chemical process. It is an essential and core component of process design.

The process design effort may be split into three basic steps

- Synthesis
- Analysis and
- Optimization.

== Synthesis ==
Synthesis is the step where the structure of the flowsheet is chosen. It is also in this step that one initializes values for variables which one is free to set.

== Analysis ==
Analysis is usually made up of three steps

- Solving heat and material balances
- Sizing and costing the equipment and
- Evaluating the economic worth, safety, operability etc. of the chosen flow sheet

== Optimization ==
Optimization involves both structural optimization of the flow sheet itself as well as optimization of parameters in a given flowsheet. In the former one may alter the equipment used and/or its connections with other equipment. In the latter one can change the values of parameters such as temperature and pressure. Parameter Optimization is a more advanced stage of theory than process flowsheet optimization.

== Plant design project ==
The first step in the sequence leading to the construction of a process plant and its use in the manufacture of a product is the conception of a process. The concept is embodied in the form of a "flow sheet". Process design then proceeds on the basis of the flow sheet chosen. Physical property data are the other component needed for process design apart from a flow sheet. The result of process design is a process flow diagram, PFD. Detailed engineering for the project and vessel specifications then begin. Process flowsheeting ends at the point of generation of a suitable PFD.

General purpose flowsheeting programs became usable and reliable around 1965-1970.

== See also ==
- List of chemical process simulators
- CAPE-OPEN Interface Standard
- Process simulation
