= Perry's Chemical Engineers' Handbook =

1934 reference book for chemical engineering

Perry's Chemical Engineers' Handbook,8th Edition
- Author: Don W. Green, Marylee Z. Southard (Editors - 9th edition)
- Language: English
- Subject: Chemical Engineering
- Publisher: McGraw-Hill
- Publication date: 23 September 2018 (9th Edition)
- Media type: Hardback
- Pages: 2272 (9th Edition)
- ISBN: 0-07-142294-3
- OCLC: 72470708
- Dewey Decimal: 660 22
- LC Class: TP151 .P45 2008

Perry's Chemical Engineers' Handbook (also known as Perry's Handbook, Perry's, or The Chemical Engineer's Bible) was first published in 1934 and the most current ninth edition was published in July 2018. It has been a source of chemical engineering knowledge for chemical engineers, and a wide variety of other engineers and scientists, through eight previous editions spanning more than 80 years.

== Subjects ==
The subjects covered in the book include: physical properties of chemicals and other materials; mathematics; thermodynamics; heat transfer; mass transfer; fluid dynamics; chemical reactors and chemical reaction kinetics; transport and storage of fluid; heat transfer equipment; psychrometry and evaporative cooling; distillation; gas absorption; liquid-liquid extraction; adsorption and ion exchange; gas–solid, liquid–solid and solid–solid operations; biochemical engineering; waste management, materials of construction, process economics and cost estimation; process safety and many others.

== History ==
The first edition was edited by John H. Perry who was a PhD physical chemist and chemical engineer for E. I. du Pont de Nemours & Co. W. S. Calcott (ChE) of DuPont was his assistant editor. It was published in 1934. The second edition was published in 1941. The third edition was edited by John H. Perry and published in 1950 The fourth edition was edited by Robert H. Perry, Cecil H. Chilton, and Sidney D. Kirkpatrick and published in 1963. The fifth edition was edited by Robert H. Perry and published in 1973. The sixth edition ("50th Anniversary Edition") was published in 1984 and edited by Robert H. Perry and Donald W. Green. The 1997 seventh edition was edited by Robert H. Perry and Donald W. Green. The 2640 page 2007–2008 eighth edition was edited by Don W. Green and Robert H. Perry. and published October 2007.

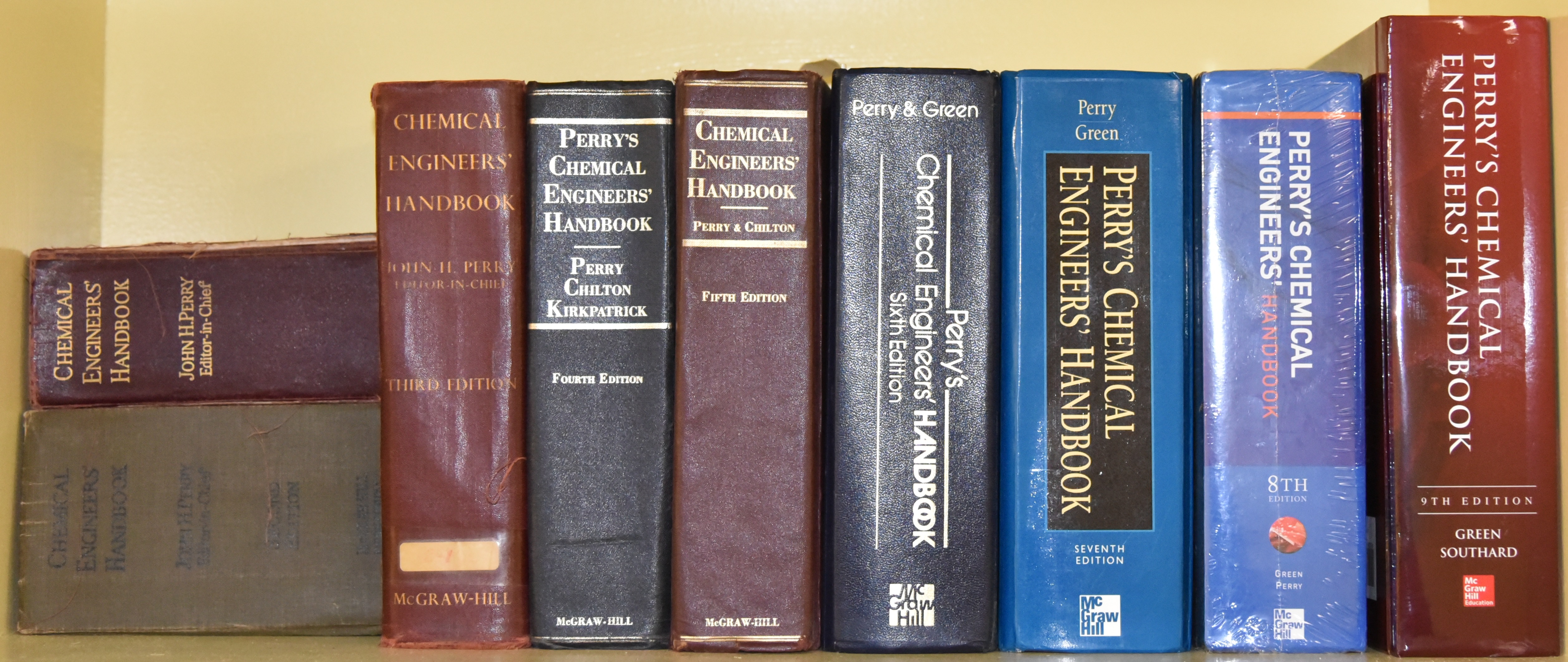
All of the editions of Perry's Chemical Engineering Handbooks.

The 2018–2019 ninth edition was edited by Don W. Green and Marylee W. Southard Don Green, the handbook's editor-in-chief, holds a B.S. in petroleum engineering from the University of Tulsa, and M.S. and PhD. Degrees in chemical engineering from the University of Oklahoma. He is Editor of the 6th, 7th and 8th Editions of Perry's. On the other hand, Marylee Southard, the associate editor, holds B.S., M.S. and PhD Degrees in chemical engineering from the University of Kansas. She is new to the publication of Perry's, but has done significant work in inorganic chemicals production including process engineering, design and product development.

== See also ==
- Chemical engineer
- Distillation Design
- Process design
- Process engineering
- Transport Phenomena
- Unit operations
- Unit Operations of Chemical Engineering
