= Waterfall chart =

Type of floating column bar chart

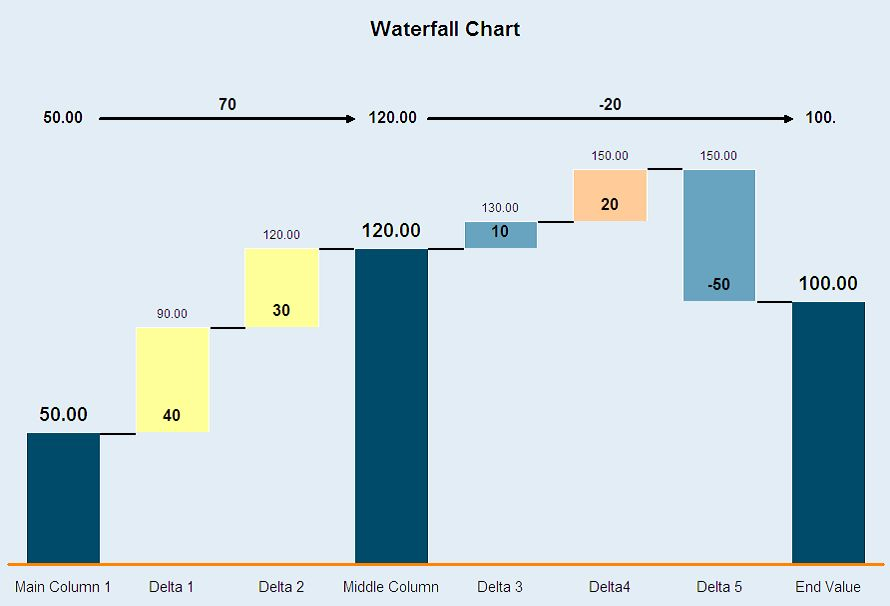
An example of waterfall charts. Here, there are 3 total columns called Main Column1, Middle Column, and End Value. The accumulation of successive two intermediate columns from the first total column (Main Column1) as the initial value results in the 2nd total column (Middle Column), and the rest accumulation results in the last total column (End Value) as the final value.

A waterfall chart is a form of data visualization that helps in understanding the cumulative effect of sequentially introduced positive or negative values. These intermediate values can either be time based or category based. The waterfall chart is also known as a flying bricks chart or Mario chart (after the floating bricks in Nintendo's "Super Mario" games) due to the apparent suspension of columns (bricks) in mid-air. Often in finance, it will be referred to as a bridge.

Waterfall charts were popularized by the strategic consulting firm McKinsey & Company in its presentations to clients.

Complexity can be added to waterfall charts with multiple total columns and values that cross the axis. Increments and decrements that are sufficiently extreme can cause the cumulative total to fall above and below the axis at various points. Intermediate subtotals, depicted with whole columns, can be added to the graph between floating columns.

== Overview ==
The waterfall is known as a bridge or cascade; the chart portrays how an initial value is affected by a series of intermediate positive or negative values. Also, it is similar to bar graph.

== Applications ==
A waterfall chart can be used for analytical purposes, especially for understanding or explaining the gradual transition in the quantitative value of an entity that is subjected to increment or decrement. Often, a waterfall or cascade chart is used to show changes in revenue or profit between two time periods.

Waterfall chart showing profitability analysis

Waterfall charts can be used for various types of quantitative analysis, ranging from inventory analysis to performance analysis.

Waterfall charts are also commonly used in financial analysis to display how a net value is arrived at through gains and losses over time or between actual and budgeted amounts. Changes in cash flows or income statement line items can also be shown via a waterfall chart. Other non-business applications include tracking demographic and legal activity changes over time.

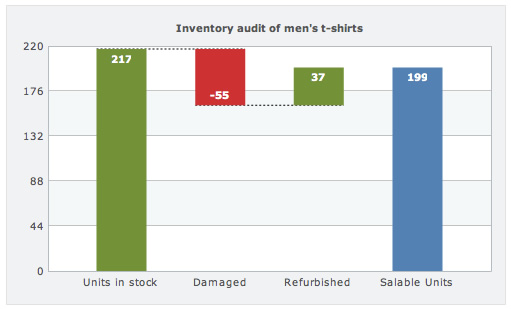
Inventory analysis using waterfall chart

There are several sources for automatic creations of Waterfall Charts (PlusX, Origin, etc.)
