= Bernhard Palsson =

- Born: Bernhard Örn Pálsson; February 22, 1957 (age 69); Reykjavík, Iceland
- Education: University of Wisconsin–Madison (PhD)
- Awards: Institute of International Education Fellowship (1977); Rotary Fellowship (1979); NATO fellowship (1984); Fulbright Fellow (1995); Lindbergh Tissue Engineering award (2001); National Academy of Engineering member (2006)
- Scientific career
- Workplaces: University of California, San Diego; University of Wisconsin–Madison; University of Michigan; Keio University
- Thesis: Mathematical Modelling of Dynamics and Control in Metabolic Networks (1984)
- Doctoral advisor: Edwin N. Lightfoot
- Doctoral students: Jay Keasling; Markus W. Covert
- Website: sbrg.ucsd.edu/Researchers/Palsson

Bernhard Örn Pálsson (born February 22, 1957 in Reykjavík, Iceland) is the Galletti Professor of Bioengineering and an adjunct professor of Medicine at the University of California, San Diego.

== Education ==
Palsson received his PhD from the University of Wisconsin–Madison in 1984 under the supervision of Edwin N. Lightfoot.

== Research ==
Upon graduation Palsson joined the chemical engineering faculty at University of Michigan where he served as a professor until 1995. In 1995, he joined the department of Bioengineering at University of California, San Diego and was named the Galetti Chair of Bioengineering in 2004. In 2005 he became a faculty member of Keio University.

Palsson has authored or co-authored over 300 peer-reviewed scientific articles and is the holder of over 35 patents. His research interests include metabolic network modelling, systems biology, tissue engineering and cell culture, the development of analysis procedures for genome-scale models, and the experimental verification of these models in Escherichia coli, Saccharomyces cerevisiae and other important organisms.

Palsson serves on the editorial board of several scientific journals including Annals of Biomedical Engineering, Biotechnology and Bioengineering, Metabolic Engineering and Molecular Systems Biology. He was elected a member of the National Academy of Engineering in 2006 for scholarship, technological advances, and entrepreneurial activities in metabolic engineering. He is also a fellow of the American Association for the Advancement of Science in 2011.
