= Markus W. Covert =

- Born: April 24, 1973
- Education: Brigham Young University, University of California, San Diego
- Scientific career
- Fields: Cellular model
- Workplaces: Stanford University
- Doctoral advisor: Bernhard Palsson
- Other academic advisors: David Baltimore

Markus W. Covert (born April 24, 1973) is a researcher and professor of bioengineering at Stanford University who led the simulation of the first organism in software. Covert leads an interdisciplinary lab of approximately 10 graduate students and post-doctoral scholars.

== Education ==
Covert received a B.S. in chemical engineering from Brigham Young University. He received a Ph.D. in bioengineering and bioinformatics from the University of California, San Diego in 2003 for his investigations into the interaction between microbial metabolism and transcriptional regulation under the supervision of Bernhard Palsson. He did his post-doctoral training in mammalian cell signaling at the California Institute of Technology under the supervision of David Baltimore.

== Honors and distinctions ==
- NIH Director's Pioneer Award, 2009
- Damon Runyon Cancer Research Foundation, Postdoctoral Fellowship
- Brigham Young University, Ezra Taft Benson Presidential Scholarship, 1991-1997
