= Robert H. Perry =

Robert H. Perry (1924–1978) was the second editor of the popular reference work Perry's Chemical Engineers' Handbook, originally edited by his father, John H. Perry, with the first edition published in 1934.

Perry taught at the University of Oklahoma from 1958 to 1964, and was department director of Chemical Engineering from 1961 to 1963. He also taught at the University of Rochester and the University of Delaware. With Sidney D. Kirkpatrick and Cecil H. Chilton, Perry supervised the production of the 4th edition, published in 1963. Perry and Chilton together edited the 5th edition, released early in 1973.

Don W. Green was chosen to edit the 6th edition, after Chilton's death from heart disease. Perry was a doctoral adviser to Green.

During this editorial process, Perry was killed as a pedestrian when struck by a car in England in 1978.
