= Transport Phenomena (book) =

First textbook about transport phenomena

- Title page for Transport Phenomena (1960)
- Author: Bird, R.B., Stewart, W.E. and Lightfoot, E.N.
- Language: English
- Subject: transport phenomena
- Publisher: John Wiley & Sons
- Publication date: 1960 (First Edition)
- Media type: Hardback
- Pages: 780
- ISBN: 0-471-07392-X
- OCLC: 964824

Transport Phenomena is the first textbook about transport phenomena. It is specifically designed for chemical engineering students. The first edition was published in 1960, two years after having been preliminarily published under the title Notes on Transport Phenomena based on mimeographed notes prepared for a chemical engineering course taught at the University of Wisconsin–Madison during the academic year 1957-1958. The second edition was published in August 2001. A revised second edition was published in 2007. This text is often known simply as BSL after its authors' initials.

== History ==
As the chemical engineering profession developed in the first half of the 20th century, the concept of "unit operations" arose as being needed in the education of undergraduate chemical engineers. The theories of mass, momentum and energy transfer were being taught at that time only to the extent necessary for a narrow range of applications. As chemical engineers began moving into a number of new areas, problem definitions and solutions required a deeper knowledge of the fundamentals of transport phenomena than those provided in the textbooks then available on unit operations.

In the 1950s, R. Byron Bird, Warren E. Stewart and Edwin N. Lightfoot stepped forward to develop an undergraduate course at the University of Wisconsin–Madison to integrate the teaching of fluid flow, heat transfer, and diffusion. From this beginning, they prepared their landmark textbook Transport Phenomena.

== Subjects covered in the book ==
The book is divided into three basic sections, named Momentum Transport, Energy Transport and Mass Transport:

- Momentum Transport
  - Viscosity and the Mechanisms of Momentum Transport
  - Momentum Balances and Velocity Distributions in Laminar Flow
  - The Equations of Change for Isothermal Systems
  - Velocity Distributions in Turbulent Flow
  - Interphase Transport in Isothermal Systems
  - Macroscopic Balances for Isothermal Flow Systems
- Energy Transport
  - Thermal Conductivity and the Mechanisms of Energy Transport
  - Energy Balances and Temperature Distributions in Solids and Laminar Flow
  - The Equations of Change for Nonisothermal Systems
  - Temperature Distributions in Turbulent Flow
  - Interphase Transport in Nonisothermal Systems
  - Macroscopic Balances for Nonisothermal Systems
- Mass transport
  - Diffusivity and the Mechanisms of Mass Transport
  - Concentration Distributions in Solids and Laminar Flow
  - Equations of Change for Multicomponent Systems
  - Concentration Distributions in Turbulent Flow
  - Interphase Transport in Nonisothermal Mixtures
  - Macroscopic Balances for Multicomponent Systems
  - Other Mechanisms for Mass Transport

== Word play ==
Transport Phenomena contains many instances of hidden messages and other word play. For example, the first letters of each sentence of the Preface spell out "This book is dedicated to O. A. Hougen." while in the revised second edition, the first letters of each paragraph spell out "Welcome". The first letters of each paragraph in the Postface spell out "On Wisconsin". In the first printing, in Fig. 9.L (p. 305) "Bird" is typeset safely outside the furnace wall.

== Advantages of the first edition over the second edition ==
According to many chemical engineering professors, the first edition is much better than the second edition. There are many reasons in this regard; The second edition has been revised many times despite the fact that there are still many defects and typographical errors in many parts of the book. On account of revision to defects of the revised second edition book, the authors published "Notes for the 2nd revised edition of TRANSPORT PHENOMENA" on 9 Aug 2011.

== See also ==
- Chemical engineer
- Distillation Design
- Transport phenomena
- Unit Operations of Chemical Engineering
- Perry's Chemical Engineers' Handbook
