= Unit Operations of Chemical Engineering =

1956 textbook in chemical engineering

- Third edition (1976)
- Author: McCabe, W., Smith, J. and Harriott, P.
- Language: English
- Subject: Chemical engineering unit operations
- Publisher: McGraw Hill
- Publication date: October 2004 (Seventh Edition)
- Media type: Hardback
- Pages: 1152
- ISBN: 0-07-284823-5
- OCLC: 55800999
- Dewey Decimal: 660/.2842 22
- LC Class: TP155.7 .M3 2005

Unit Operations of Chemical Engineering, first published in 1956, is one of the oldest chemical engineering textbooks still in widespread use. The current Seventh Edition, published in 2004, continues its successful tradition of being used as a textbook in university undergraduate chemical engineering courses. The original authors were Warren L. McCabe (1899–1982) and Julian C. Smith (1919–2015), with Peter Harriott (1927–2021) added as a co-author for later editions. It is widely used in colleges and universities throughout the world, and often simply referred to as "McCabe-Smith-Harriott" or "MSH".

== Subjects covered in the book ==
The book starts with an introductory chapter devoted to definitions and principles. It then follows with 28 additional chapters, each covering a principal chemical engineering unit operation. The 28 chapters are grouped into four major sections:

- Fluid mechanics
- Heat transfer
- Mass transfer and equilibrium stages
- Operations involving particulate solids.

A more detailed table of contents is available on the Internet.

== See also ==
- Chemical engineer
- Category:Unit operations
- Distillation Design
- Perry's Chemical Engineers' Handbook
- Process design
- Transport Phenomena
- Unit operations
