= Joseph O. Hirschfelder =

American chemical physicist (1911–1990)

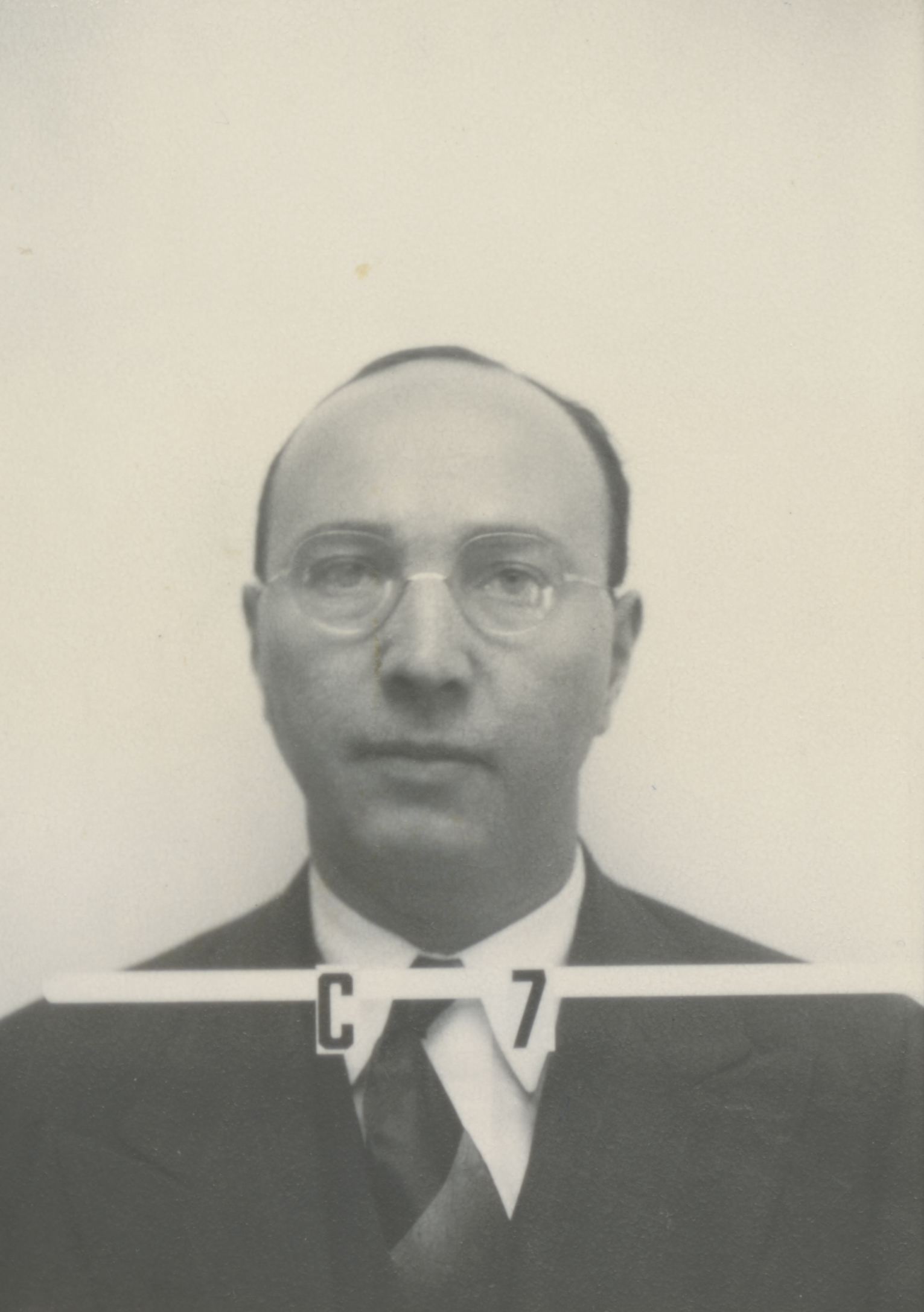
- Los Alamos badge
- Born: May 27, 1911; Baltimore, Maryland, U.S.
- Died: March 30, 1990 (aged 78)
- Education: University of Minnesota; Yale University; Princeton University
- Known for: Hirschfelder–Curtiss variable Backward differentiation formula
- Scientific career
- Fields: Physics
- Workplaces: Institute for Advanced Study; University of Wisconsin; National Defense Research Committee; Los Alamos National Laboratory
- Thesis: (1936)
- Doctoral advisor: Henry Eyring; Eugene Wigner; Hugh Stott Taylor
- Doctoral students: Charles Francis Curtiss; Robert Byron Bird

Joseph Oakland Hirschfelder (May 27, 1911 – March 30, 1990) was an American theoretical chemist who studied atomic and molecular quantum mechanics, the rates of chemical reactions, and the structure and properties of gases and liquids.

Hirschfelder also participated in the Manhattan Project, which created the atomic bomb.

== Biography ==
Hirschfelder was born in Baltimore, Maryland, the son of a Jewish couple, Arthur Douglas and May Rosalie (Straus). He completed his undergraduate studies at the University of Minnesota from 1927 to 1929 and at Yale University from 1929 to 1931. Hirschfelder received doctorates in physics and chemistry from Princeton University under the direction of Eugene Wigner, Henry Eyring and Hugh Stott Taylor. He worked as a postdoctoral fellow with John von Neumann for a year after his PhD at the Institute for Advanced Study. In 1937, he moved to University of Wisconsin and stayed there until retirement in 1981, except during World War II.

Robert Oppenheimer assembled a team at the Los Alamos Laboratory to work on plutonium gun design Thin Man, that included senior engineer Edwin McMillan and senior physicists Charles Critchfield and Joseph Hirschfelder. Hirschfelder had been working on internal ballistics. Oppenheimer led the design effort himself until June 1943, when Navy Captain William Sterling Parsons arrived took over the Ordnance and Engineering Division and direct management of the "Thin Man" project.

Hirschfelder was a member of the National Academy of Sciences, a group leader in theoretical physics and ordnance at the Los Alamos Atomic Bomb Laboratory, chief phenomenologist at the nuclear bomb tests at Bikini, the founder of the Theoretical Chemistry Institute and the Homer Adkins professor emeritus of chemistry at the University of Wisconsin.

Hirschfelder was also a fellow of the American Academy of Arts and Sciences. He was awarded the National Medal of Science from President Gerald Ford “for his fundamental contributions to atomic and molecular quantum mechanics, the theory of the rates of chemical reactions, and the structure and properties of gases and liquids”.

The National Academies Press called him "one of the leading figures in theoretical chemistry during the period 1935–90". In 1991 an award was established in his name by the University of Wisconsin's Theoretical Chemistry Institute – the annual Joseph O. Hirschfelder Prize in Theoretical Chemistry. He was an elected member of the International Academy of Quantum Molecular Science.

His book coauthored with Charles F. Curtiss and Robert Byron Bird, Molecular theory of gases and liquids, is a comprehensive text on the kinetic theories of gases and liquids.

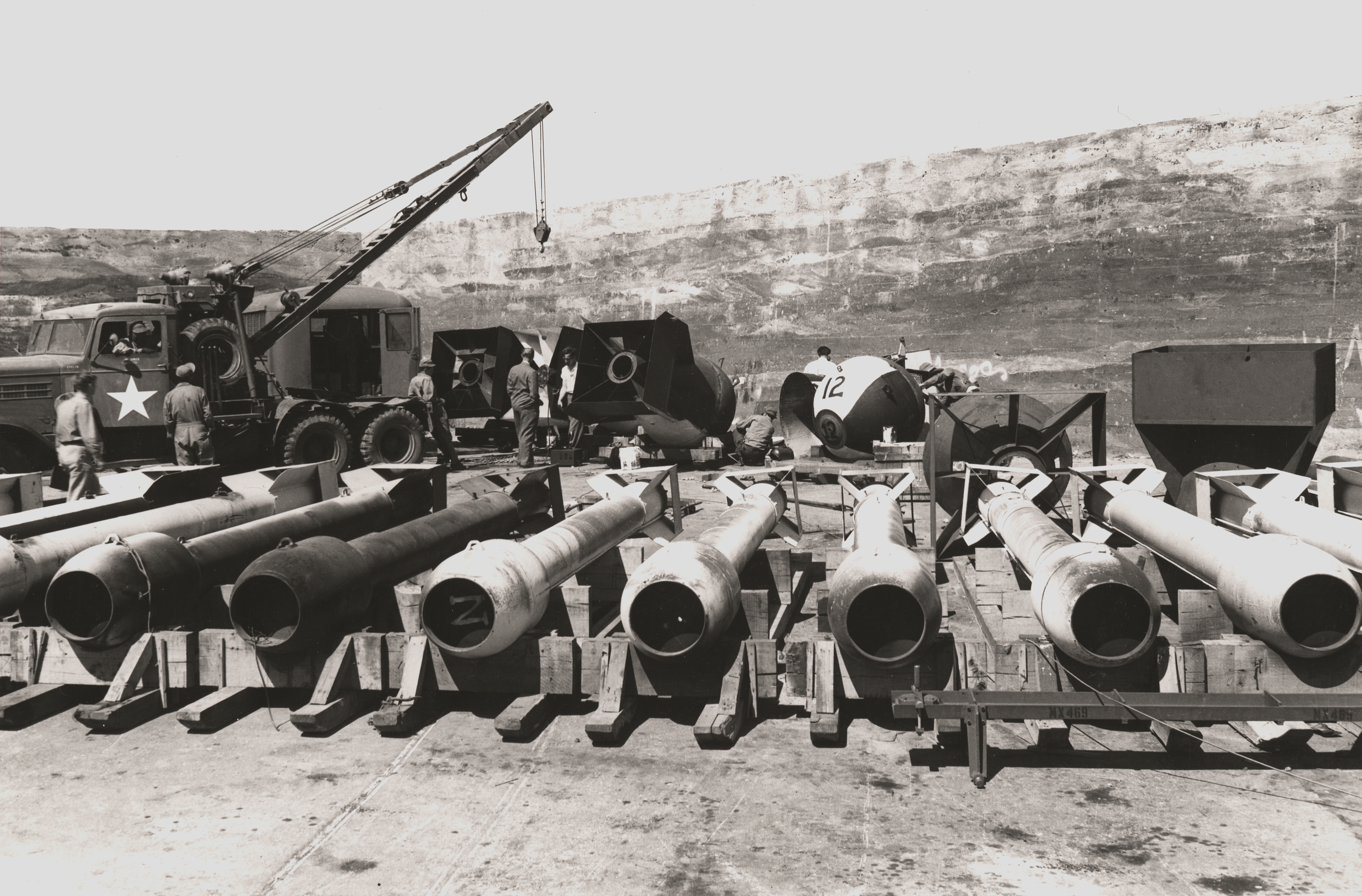
Thin Man plutonium gun test casings at Muroc Army Airfield, as part of Project Alberta in the Manhattan Project. A Fat Man casing can be seen behind them.

== Publications ==
=== Books ===
- Joseph O. Hirschfelder; Charles F. Curtiss; Robert Byron Bird (1966). Molecular theory of gases and liquids. Wiley Interscience. ISBN 978-0471400653.

== Awards and distinctions ==
- 1953 - elected to the National Academy of Sciences
- 1959 - elected to the American Academy of Arts and Sciences
- 1963 - elected Honorary Member of the American Society of Mechanical Engineers
- 1965 - elected to the Norwegian Royal Society
- 1966 - the Peter Debye Award from the American Chemical Society
- 1966 - the Alfred C. Egerton Gold Medal of the Combustion Institute
- 1976 - the National Medal of Science
- 1978 - honorary degree from Marquette University
- 1980 - honorary degree the University of Southern California
- 1981 - elected to the Royal Society of Chemistry of Great Britain

Joseph O. Hirschfelder Prize is awarded annually by the department of chemistry at the University of Wisconsin in honor of Hirschfelder.

== Source ==
- Hoddeson, Lillian; Henriksen, Paul W.; Meade, Roger A.; Westfall, Catherine L. (1993). Critical Assembly: A Technical History of Los Alamos During the Oppenheimer Years, 1943–1945. New York, New York: Cambridge University Press. ISBN 0-521-44132-3. OCLC 26764320.
