= Chemical technologist =

Chemical technologists and technicians (abbr. chem techs) are workers who provide technical support or services in chemical-related fields. They may work under direct supervision or may work independently, depending on their specific position and duties. Their work environments differ widely and include, but are not limited to, laboratories and industrial settings. As such, it is nearly impossible to generalize the duties of chem techs as their individual jobs vary greatly. Biochemical techs often do similar work in biochemistry.

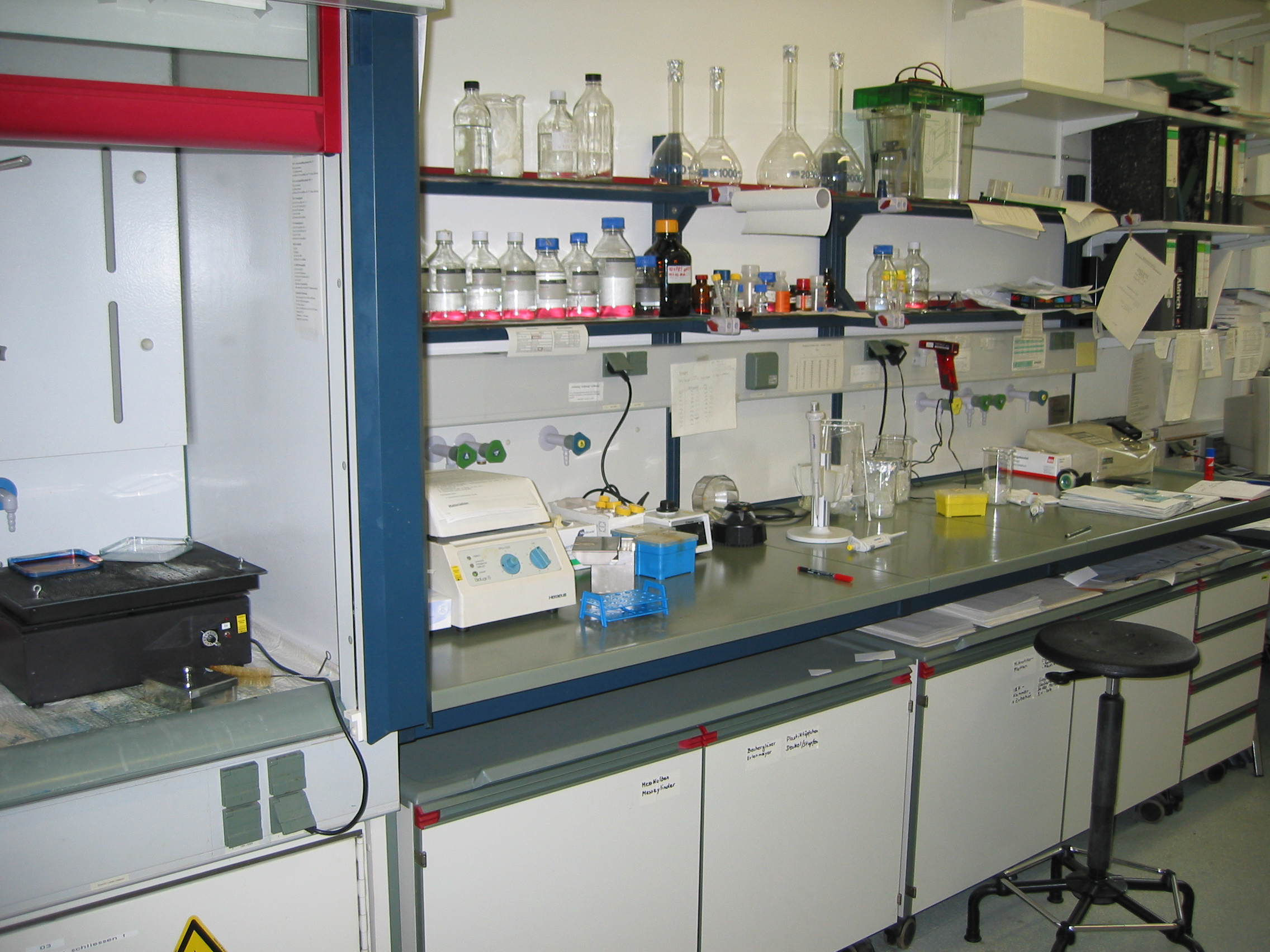
Laboratory, Institute of Biochemistry, University of Cologne

== Technologists ==
Chemical technologists are more likely than technicians to participate in the actual design of experiments, and may be involved in the interpretation of experimental data. They may also be responsible for the operation of chemical processes in large plants, and may even assist chemical engineers in the design of the same.

Some post-secondary education is generally required to be either a chemical technician or technologist. Occasionally, a company may be willing to provide a high school graduate with training to become a chemical technician, but more often, a two-year degree will be required. Chemical technologists generally require completion of a specific college program—either two year or four year— in chemical, biochemical, or chemical engineering technology or a closely related discipline. They usually work under or with a scientist such as a chemist or biochemist.

== Technicians ==
Chemical or biochemical technicians often work in clinical (medical) laboratories conducting routine analyses of medical samples such as blood and urine. Industries which employ chem techs include chemical, petrochemical, and pharmaceutical industries. Companies within these industries can be concerned with manufacturing, research and development (R&D), consulting, quality control, and a variety of other areas. Also, chem techs working for these companies may be used to conduct quality control and other routine analyses, or assist in chemical and biochemical research including analyses, industrial chemistry, environmental protection, and even chemical engineering.

== Duties ==
As a general rule, chemical technologists are more likely to be provided with greater autonomy and more complex responsibilities than chemical technicians.

=== Chemical technicians ===
The most common work done by chemical technicians is in R&D. They often work in a laboratory environment under the supervision of a chemist or a chemical engineer.

They may typically assist in setting up and conducting chemical experiments, and may operate lab equipment under supervision. They are expected to maintain established quality control standards. They may also compile records for analytical studies, and sometimes are involved in writing reports on studies.

National certification for chemical technologists and technicians is required in some countries.
