= Metabolic Engineering (journal) =

- Discipline: Biotechnology
- Language: English
- Edited by: Sang Yup Lee, Jens Nielsen

Publication details
- History: 1999-present
- Publisher: Elsevier
- Frequency: Bimonthly
- Impact factor: 7.808 (2018)

Standard abbreviations
- ISO 4: Metab. Eng.

Indexing
- CODEN: MEENFM
- ISSN: 1096-7176 (print); 1096-7184 (web)
- LCCN: 99113494
- OCLC no.: 37861577

Links
- Journal homepage; Online access

Metabolic Engineering is a peer-reviewed scientific journal covering research on production of fuels and chemicals using microorganisms and other biological systems. The journal specialises in quantitative analyses of metabolic pathways and their relationship to cell physiology in industrial and medical contexts.

== Abstracting and indexing ==
The journal is abstracted and indexed in Biotechnology Citation Index, Chemical Abstracts Service, Current Contents/Life Sciences, Clinical Medicine, EMBASE, EMBiology, MEDLINE, and Scopus.
