= Edwin N. Lightfoot =

American chemical engineer

- Born: September 25, 1925; Milwaukee, Wisconsin, U.S.
- Died: October 2, 2017 (aged 92); Madison, Wisconsin, U.S.
- Education: Cornell University (BS, PhD)
- Known for: Transport Phenomena, Transport Phenomena and Living Systems: Biomedical Aspects of Momentum and Mass Transport
- Spouse: Lila Smith Lightfoot (nee Ruth Lila Smith)
- Awards: E. V. Murphree Award (1994); National Medal of Science (2004)
- Scientific career
- Fields: Chemical and biological engineering
- Workplaces: University of Wisconsin-Madison; Pfizer & Co.
- Doctoral advisor: Fred H. "Dusty" Rhodes
- Doctoral students: Bernhard Palsson; James C. Liao

Edwin Niblock Lightfoot, Jr. (September 25, 1925 – October 2, 2017) was an American chemical engineer and Hilldale Professor Emeritus in the department of chemical and biological engineering at the University of Wisconsin-Madison. He is known for his research in transport phenomena, including biological mass-transfer processes, mass-transport reaction modeling, and separations processes. He, along with R. Byron Bird and Warren E. Stewart, co-authored the classic textbook Transport Phenomena. In 1974 Lightfoot wrote Transport Phenomena and Living Systems: Biomedical Aspects of Momentum and Mass Transport. He was the recipient of the 2004 National Medal of Science in Engineering Sciences.

== Education and career ==
Lightfoot received his B.S. and Ph.D. degrees in chemical engineering from Cornell University in 1947 and 1950. After graduation he worked as a junior engineer at General Foods in Hoboken, New Jersey. His Ph.D. thesis (Gasification of Coke) was supported by the Pittsburgh Consolidation Coal Company. After graduate school he worked for Pfizer & Co in Brooklyn where he received US Patent US2787578 A for his development of a commercial process for recovering and purifying vitamin B12.

He began his teaching career at the University of Wisconsin-Madison in 1953. There he co-authored Transport Phenomena with his colleagues R. Byron Bird and Warren E. Stewart. This first edition of this book was in print for 41 years and was translated into five languages. A second edition followed in 2001. In 1974, Lightfoot wrote Transport Phenomena and Living Systems: Biomedical Aspects of Momentum and Mass Transport.

Lightfoot was the Hilldale Professor of Chemical Engineering, and upon his retirement in 1996, Hilldale Professor Emeritus in the department of chemical and biological engineering, as the department was renamed. His research interests were in the development of improved separation processes and controlling the dynamics of biological systems. In later life, he turned his attention to ways of developing scientifically informed intuition in bioengineers (in particular quantum biology).

Lightfoot was an inventor, holding US patents US2996430A for synthetic ion exchange resin recovery of vitamin b12 (Pfizer), US3094936A for fuel cell for sump pumps (A. O. Smith), US7141171 for membrane cascade-based separation (2006), and an additional patent with Michael Cochrem for membrane cascade-based separation, a counter flow cascade system that features a novel separation technique.

== Awards and honors ==
Lightfoot was a 2004 recipient of the National Medal of Science, awarded by President George W. Bush "for his innovative research and leadership in transport phenomena focusing on biochemical and biomedical engineering with application to blood oxygenation, bioseparation techniques, and diabetic responses."

As emeritus in 1996 Lightfoot received the AICHE Keynote Speaker Award, for which he delivered the keynote speech at a convention in Chicago that year.

Lightfoot was elected a Fellow of the American Academy of Arts and Sciences in 1992. He was elected to the membership of both the National Academy of Engineering for "Contributions to mass transfer and separation processes, and research on quantitative design procedures in biochemical and biomedical engineering" in 1979 and the National Academy of Sciences in 1995. He was one of three members to be elected to both academies. He was a Founding Fellow of the American Institute of Medical and Biological Engineering (1992).

He was awarded the AIChE's William Walker Award for contributions to chemical engineering literature (1985) and its Warren K. Lewis Award for Chemical Engineering Education (1991).

In 1985, he was awarded an honorary doctorate from the University of Trondheim (formerly Norwegian Institute of Technology and now the Norwegian University of Science and Technology), where he had worked on a Fulbright Research Scholarship in 1962. In 2000, he was awarded an honorary doctorate from the Danish Technical University (DTU).

In the spring of 2016, the University of Wisconsin Department of Chemical and Biological Engineering hosted qbio 2016, a symposium in honor of Lightfoot's 90th birthday.

== Books ==
Lightfoot is the co-author of several influential books in transport phenomena, including the classic textbook Transport Phenomena, which was translated into many languages, including Spanish, Italian, Czech, Russian, and Chinese.

- Transport Phenomena
- Transport Phenomena in Living Systems: Biomedical Aspects of Momentum and Mass Transport
