= Chemical process modeling =

Chemical process modeling is a computer modeling technique used in chemical engineering process design. It typically involves using purpose-built software to define a system of interconnected components, which are then solved so that the steady-state or dynamic behavior of the system can be predicted. The system components and connections are represented as a process flow diagram. Simulations can be as simple as the mixing of two substances in a tank, or as complex as an entire alumina refinery.

Chemical process modeling requires a knowledge of the properties of the chemicals involved in the simulation, as well as the physical properties and characteristics of the components of the system, such as tanks, pumps, pipes, pressure vessels, and so on.

== See also ==
- Manufacturing process management
- Process simulation
- Process optimization
- Process design (chemical engineering)
- Process systems engineering
