= Distillation Design =

Handbook for design of industrial distillation columns

- Author: Henry Z. Kister
- Language: English
- Subject: Chemical engineering: Distillation design
- Publisher: McGraw-Hill
- Publication date: 1992 (1st Edition)
- Media type: Hardback
- Pages: 710
- ISBN: 0-07-034909-6
- OCLC: 24142446

Distillation Design is a book which provides complete coverage of the design of industrial distillation columns for the petroleum refining, chemical and petrochemical plants, natural gas processing, pharmaceutical, food and alcohol distilling industries. It has been a classical chemical engineering textbook since it was first published in February 1992.

The subjects covered in the book include:

- Vapor–liquid equilibrium(VLE): Vapor–liquid K values, relative volatilities, ideal and non-ideal systems, phase diagrams, calculating bubble points and dew points
- Key fractional distillation concepts: theoretical stages, x-y diagrams, multicomponent distillation, column composition and temperature profiles
- Process design and optimization: minimum reflux and minimum stages, optimum reflux, short-cut methods, feed entry location
- Rigorous calculation methods: Bubble point method, sum rates method, numerical methods (Newton–Raphson technique), inside out method, relaxation method, other methods
- Batch distillation: Simple distillation, constant reflux, varying reflux, time and boilup requirements
- Tray design and tray efficiency: tray types, tray capacities, tray hydraulic parameters, tray sizing and determination of column diameter, point and tray efficiencies, tray efficiency prediction and scaleup
- Packing design and packing efficiency: packing types, packing hydraulics and capacities, determination of packing efficiency by transfer unit method and by HETP method, packed column sizing

== See also ==
- Chemical engineer – Professional designation branch of engineering
- Continuous distillation – Form of distillation
- Fenske equation – Equation used in chemical engineering
- McCabe-Thiele method – Chemical engineering technique
- Perry's Chemical Engineers' Handbook – 1934 reference book for chemical engineering
- Transport Phenomena – First textbook about transport phenomena
- Unit Operations of Chemical Engineering – 1956 textbook in chemical engineering
- Batch distillation – Process in chemistry
