= Robert Byron Bird =

American chemical engineer (1924–2020)

- Born: February 5, 1924; Bryan, Texas, U.S.
- Died: November 13, 2020 (aged 96)
- Education: University of Illinois at Urbana-Champaign (BS); University of Wisconsin (PhD)
- Known for: FENE-P model
- Scientific career
- Fields: Transport phenomena, Non-Newtonian fluids, Rheology, Polymers
- Workplaces: University of Wisconsin-Madison
- Thesis: Intermolecular forces and the virial equation of state (1950)
- Doctoral advisor: Joseph O. Hirschfelder
- Doctoral students: Arnold Fredrickson; Pierre Carreau; Robert C. Armstrong

Robert Byron Bird (February 5, 1924 – November 13, 2020) was an American chemical engineer and professor emeritus in the department of chemical engineering at the University of Wisconsin-Madison. He was known for his research in transport phenomena of non-Newtonian fluids, including fluid dynamics of polymers, polymer kinetic theory, and rheology. He, along with Warren E. Stewart and Edwin N. Lightfoot, was an author of the classic textbook Transport Phenomena. Bird was a recipient of the National Medal of Science in 1987.

== Childhood and education ==
Robert Byron Bird was born on February 5, 1924, in Bryan, Texas. His father, Byron Bird, was a professor of civil engineering at Texas A&M University. In his, Bird recounts he obtain his elementary and junior high education in Fort Dodge, Iowa, and thereafter he attending Central High school in Washington D. C. Bird attended University of Maryland from 1941 to 1943, where he was initiated into the Alpha Rho chapter of Alpha Chi Sigma in 1943. He had to discontinue his studies during World War II, in which he served in the US Army. As a second lieutenant in the 90th Chemical Mortar Battalion, he saw action from the eastern Belgium to the Austrian border. Bird received his B.S. degree in chemical engineering from the University of Illinois at Urbana-Champaign in 1947 and Ph.D. degree in physical chemistry from University of Wisconsin in 1950. During 1950–1951, he was a postdoctoral fellow at Instituut voor Theoretische Fysica, Universiteit van Amsterdam under Jan Hendrik de Boer. During his postdoc, he co-authored his first textbook, the 1,200-page Molecular Theory of Gases and Liquids, along with his advisor Joseph O. Hirschfelder and another UW-Madison professor Charles F. Curtiss.

== Awards and honors ==
Bird was a recipient of the National Medal of Science; the Medal was awarded by President Ronald Reagan "for his profoundly influential books and research on kinetic theory, transport phenomena, the behavior of polymeric fluids, and foreign language study for engineers and scientists." He was awarded the Bingham Medal in 1974 for his outstanding contributions to the field of rheology and Eringen Medal in 1983.

He was a member of the National Academy of Engineering since 1969, member of the National Academy of Sciences since 1989, and a number of foreign academies, including the Royal Netherlands Academy of Arts and Sciences (1985), Royal Belgian Academy of Sciences (1994). Bird was also a Fellow of the American Academy of Arts and Sciences since 1981, the American Physical Society since 1970, and the American Academy of Mechanics since 1983. In 2015 he was elected a Fellow of the American Association for the Advancement of Science.

In 2004, Bird was granted the Dutch title Knight of the Order of Orange-Nassau for his "exceptional contributions to the promotion of Dutch language and culture in the United States and at the University of Wisconsin".

He was inducted into the Alpha Chi Sigma Hall of Fame in 2008. He was recipient of the Reed M. Izatt and James J. Christensen Lectureship in 2010.

Bird died in November 2020 at the age of 96.

== Books ==
Bird was the coauthor of several influential books in transport phenomena and rheology, including the classic textbook Transport Phenomena, which was translated into many foreign languages, including Spanish, Italian, Czech, Russian, Persian, and Chinese and the 1200-page tome Molecular Theory of Gases and Liquids.

- TRANSPORT PHENOMENA (2nd Ed.). Wiley India Pvt. Limited. 2006. ISBN 978-81-265-0808-2.
- Bird, R.B.; Stewart, W.E.; Lightfoot, E.N.; Klingenberg, D.J. (2015). Introductory Transport Phenomena. Wiley. ISBN 978-1-118-95371-6.
- Hirschfelder, J.O. Molecular theory of gases and liquids, by J.O. Hirschfelder, C.F. Curtiss and R.B. Bird. publisher not identified.
- Bird, R.B.; Armstrong, R.C.; Hassager, O. (1987). Dynamics of Polymeric Liquids, Volume 1: Fluid Mechanics. Dynamics of Polymeric Liquids. Wiley. ISBN 978-0-471-80245-7.
- Dynamics of Polymeric Liquids, Vol. 2, Kinetic Theory, with C. F. Curtiss, R. C. Armstrong, and O. Hassager, Wiley, (1977, 2nd ed. 1987).

Since the publication of Transport Phenomena, the subject of transport phenomena has become a standard and essential course in chemical engineering curricula in universities in the U.S. and abroad.
