= Inventory analysis =

Method used to choose inventory levels

Inventory analysis is one of the branches of Operation Research which deals in studying and understanding the stock/product mix combined with the knowledge of the demand for stock/product. It is the technique to determine the optimum level of inventory for a firm.

== Methods and applications ==
Inventory analysis is widely used to classify and manage stock items according to their demand patterns and strategic importance within a firm’s operations. Modern analytical approaches combine traditional inventory control with techniques such as ABC–XYZ classification and safety-stock modelling to determine optimal stock levels and reduce the likelihood of shortages. These methods enable firms to identify high-value items with stable demand, distinguish them from low-value or highly variable-demand items, and allocate resources more efficiently.

== Computing inventory balances ==
- Average-cost method
- First in first out
- Last in first out
