= Unit process =

A unit process is one or more grouped unit operations in a manufacturing system that can be defined and separated from others.

In life-cycle assessment (LCA) and ISO 14040, a unit process is defined as "smallest element considered in the life cycle inventory analysis for which input and output data are quantified".

== See also ==
- Unit operation
