= Chemical process =

Change in matter of constant composition, usually involving other such matters

A chemical process is a means by which one or more substances undergoes a change in chemical identity. Such a process can occur by itself or be caused by an outside force, and involves a chemical reaction of some sort. In practical applications, a chemical process is a method intended to be used in manufacturing or on an industrial scale (see Industrial process) to change the composition of chemical(s) or material(s), usually using technology similar or related to that used in chemical plants or the chemical industry.

Neither of these definitions are exact in the sense that one can always tell definitively what is a chemical process and what is not; they are practical definitions. There is also significant overlap in these two definition variations. Because of the inexactness of the definition, chemists and other scientists use the term "chemical process" only in a general sense or in the engineering sense. However, in the "process (engineering)" sense, the term "chemical process" is used extensively. The rest of the article will cover the engineering type of chemical processes.

Although this type of chemical process may sometimes involve only one step, often multiple steps, referred to as unit operations, are involved. In a plant, each of the unit operations commonly occur in individual vessels or sections of the plant called units. Often, one or more chemical reactions are involved, but other ways of changing chemical (or material) composition may be used, such as mixing or separation processes. The process steps may be sequential in time or sequential in space along a stream of flowing or moving material; see Chemical plant. For a given amount of a feed (input) material or product (output) material, an expected amount of material can be determined at key steps in the process from empirical data and material balance calculations. These amounts can be scaled up or down to suit the desired capacity or operation of a particular chemical plant built for such a process. More than one chemical plant may use the same chemical process, each plant perhaps at differently scaled capacities. Chemical processes like distillation and crystallization go back to alchemy in Alexandria, Egypt.

Such chemical processes can be illustrated generally as block flow diagrams, or in more detail as process flow diagrams. Block flow diagrams show the units as blocks and the streams flowing between them as connecting lines with arrowheads to show direction of flow.

In addition to chemical plants for producing chemicals, chemical processes with similar technology and equipment are also used in oil refining and other refineries, natural gas processing, polymer and pharmaceutical manufacturing, food processing, and water and wastewater treatment.

== Unit processing in chemical process ==
Unit processing is the basic processing in chemical engineering. Together with unit operations it forms the main principle of the varied chemical industries. Each genre of unit processing follows the same chemical law much as each genre of unit operations follows the same physical law.

Chemical engineering unit processing consists of the following important processes:

- Fractionation
- Decontamination
- Distillation
- Filtration
- Oxidation
- Reduction
- Refining / Refining (metallurgy)
- Hydrogenation
- Dehydrogenation
- Hydrolysis
- Hydration
- Dehydration
- Halogenation
- Nitrification
- Sulfonation
- Amination
- Alkylation
- Dealkylation
- Esterification
- Polymerization
- Polycondensation
- Purification
- Catalysis

== Academic research institutes in process chemistry ==
- Institute of Process Research & Development, University of Leeds

== See also ==
- Chemical plant
- Chemical reaction
- Foam fractionation
- Industrial process
- Process (engineering)
- Separation process
