= Modeling and simulation of batch distillation unit =

Aspen Plus, Aspen HYSYS, ChemCad, MATLAB, and PRO are commonly used process simulators for modeling, simulation and optimization of a distillation process in the chemical industries. Distillation is the technique of preferential separation of the more volatile components from the less volatile ones in a feed followed by condensation. The vapor produced is richer in the more volatile components. The distribution of the component in the two phase is governed by the vapour-liquid equilibrium relationship. In practice, distillation may be carried out by one of two principal methods. The first method is based on the production of vapor; boiling the liquid mixture to be separated and condensing the vapors without allowing any liquid to return to the still, preventing reflux. The second method is based on the return of part of the condensate to the still under such conditions that this returning liquid is brought into intimate contact with the vapors on their way to condenser.

== Chemical process modeling ==
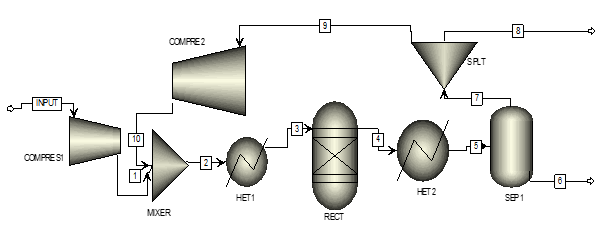

Chemical Process modeling is a technique used in chemical engineering process design. Process modeling is defined as the physical, mathematical or logical representation of the real process, system or phenomena using model libraries present in process simulator software. This software can be used to define a system of interconnected components. A system in this context is defined as group of objects that are joined together in some regular order or interdependence toward the accomplishment of some purpose. The system can then be solved so that the steady-state or dynamic behavior of the system can be predicted. Components of the system and connections are represented as a process flow diagram. A flow diagram for the ammonia process (Finlayson, 2006) is shown in figure 1 below using Aspen Plus software.

Developing a mathematical model of a chemical engineering system can help develop an understanding of the overall process. Mathematical models can be useful in any phase of chemical engineering, from research and development to plant operations and even in business and economics studies. The basis for the mathematical models are the fundamental physical and chemical laws, such as the laws of conservation of mass, energy and momentum, degree of freedom.

== Process simulation ==
A simulation is the representation of the real world process or system over a period of time. Simulation can be done by hand or on a computer. Simulation involves the generation and observation of artificial history of the system to draw inferences of the operating characteristics of the real system. Thus, simulation modelling can be used both as an analysis tool for predicating the effect of changes to existing system and as a design tool to predict the performance of new systems under varying circumstances. Process simulations describe process flow diagrams where various unit operations are present and connected by product streams.

Simulation is extensively used both in academia and industry to predicate the behavior of processes using material balance equations, equilibrium relationship, reaction kinetics, etc.

== Batch distillation ==
In batch distillation, the feed is charged to the still pot to which heat is supplied continuously through a steam jacket or a steam coil. As the mixture boils, it generates a vapour richer and more volatile. But as boiling continues, the concentration of volatility in the liquid decreases. It is generally assumed that equilibrium vaporization occurs in the still. The vapour is led to a condenser and the condensate or the top product is collected in the receiver. At the beginning, the condensate will be more volatile, but the concentrations of volitility in it decreases as the condensate accumulates in the receiver. The condensate is usually withdrawn intermittently, having products or cuts of different concentrations. Batch distillation is used when the feed rate is not large enough to justify installation of a continuous distillation unit. It may also be used when the constituents greatly differ in volatility. Figure 1 show the batch distillation setup.

=== Batch distillation of binary mixture ===
Let L be the moles of material in the still and x be the concentration of the volatile component (i.e. A) and let the moles of accumulated condensate be D. Concentration of the equilibrium vapour is over a small time, the change in the amount of liquid in the still is $dL$ and the amount of vapour withdrawn is $dD$. The following differential mass balance equation may be written as: Let L be the moles of material in the still and x be the concentration of the volatile component (i.e. A) and let the moles of accumulated condensate be D. Concentration of the equilibrium vapour is over a small time, the change in the amount of liquid in the still is $dL$ and the amount of vapour withdrawn is $dD$. The following

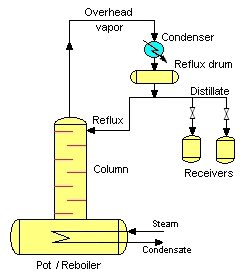
Figure 1-Batch distillation process

differential mass balance equation may be written as:

Total material balance: $-dL$ = $dD$ ----- (i)

Component A balance: $-d(Lx) = y^*dD$ ----- (ii) $\longrightarrow$ $-LdX = y^*dD + xdL = y^*dD - xdD = (y^* -x)dD$ ----- (iii)

Equation (i) means that the total amount of vapour generated must be equal to the decrease in the total amount of liquid. Similarly, equation (ii) means that loss in the number of moles of A from the still because of vaporization is the same as the amount of A in the small amount of vapour generated.

Putting $dD = -dL$ in Equation (iii) and rearranging,

$\frac{dL}{L}$= $\frac{dx}{y^*-x}$ ------(iv)

If distillation starts with F moles of feed of concentration and continues till the amount of liquid reduces to W moles (composition =x_{w}), the above equation can be integrated to give

$\textstyle \int\limits_{F}^{W} \displaystyle \frac{dL}{L}$ = $\textstyle \int\limits_{x_F}^{x_w} \displaystyle \frac{dx}{y^*-x}$ $\longrightarrow\ln\frac{F}{W}$ = $\textstyle \int\limits_{x_w}^{x_F} \displaystyle \frac{dx}{y^*-x}$ ------(v)

Equation (v) is the basic equation of batch distillation and is called as the Rayleigh equation. The Rayleigh equation is used for calculation of data in the batch distillation column.

== Aspen Plus software ==
=== History ===
During the 1970s, research was done to develop a novel technology at the Massachusetts Institute of Technology (MIT) with United States Department of Energy funding. This undertaking was known as the Advanced System for Process Engineering (ASPEN) Project, and was originally intended to design nonlinear simulation software that could aid in development of synthetic fuels. In 1981, AspenTech, a publicly traded company was founded to commercialize the simulation software package. Aspen Tech went public in October 1994 and has acquired 19 industry-leading companies as a part of its mission to offer a complete, integrated solution to the process industries.

As the complexity of a plant integrated with the several process unit increases, solving large equation sets becomes more challenging. Process flowsheet simulators are typically used to address this challenge.

=== Type of Aspen simulator package ===
The Aspen Software tool can simulate large processes with a high degree of accuracy. It has a model library that includes mixers, splitters, as phase separator, heat exchanger, distillation columns, and reactor pressure changers manipulators, etc. By interconnecting several unit operations, process flow diagram (PFD) can be developed for a complete plant. To solve the model structure of either a single unit of a chemical plant, the required Fortran code are built into the Aspen simulator.

Aspen simulator has been developed for the simulation of wide variety of processes such as chemical and petrochemical, petroleum refining, polymer, and coal based processes.

Nowadays, different Aspen package are available for various types of simulations. Some examples are listed below.

Aspen Plus – This type of process simulator is used for steady state simulation of chemicals, petrochemicals and petroleum industries. It is also used for performance monitoring, design, optimization and business planning.

Aspen Dynamics – This type of process simulator is used for dynamics study and closed loop control of several process industries. Aspen Dynamics is integrated with Aspen Plus.

Aspen Batch CAD – This simulator is typically used for batch processing, reaction and distillations. It can derive reaction and kinetic information form the experimental data to create a process simulation.

Aspen Chromatography – This is a dynamic simulation software package used for both batch chromatography and chromatography simulated moving bed processes.

Aspen Properties – This is used for calculating thermophysical properties.

Aspen Polymer Plus – This is a modeling tool for steady state and dynamic simulation and optimization of polymer processes. This is available within Aspen Plus or Aspen Properties rather than via an external menu.

Aspen HYSIS – This process modeling package is typically used for steady state simulation, performance monitoring, design, optimization and business planning for petroleum refining, and oil and gas industries.

Aspen simulates the performance of the designed process. A solid understanding of the underlying chemical engineering principles is needed to supply reasonable value of input parameters and analyse the result obtained. In addition to the process flow diagram, other information is needed to simulate a process, including setup, components properties, streams and blocks.

== Simulation result of batch distillation unit ==
The BatchFrac is a model used for simulation of batch distillation column that is present in the model library of simulation software. It also includes the reactions occurred in any stage of

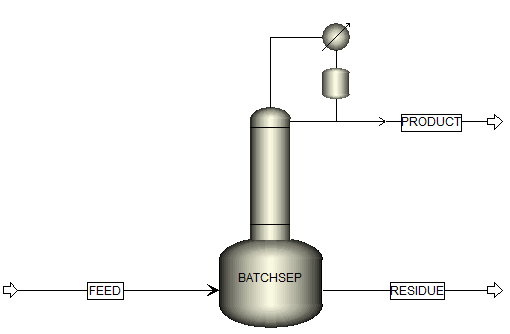
'Figure 2 –process flow diagram of batch distillation column (for ethanol and water)'

the separator. The BatchFrac model does not consider column hydraulics, and there is negligible vapour holdup and constant liquid holdup. The modeling and simulation of batch distillation units is done with Aspen Plus, used with the following data given in the table and check the simulation result.

Various steps are involved in the simulation of batch distillation column using aspen plus software is :

- Understand the problem statement and input stream data

Feed data
Temperature =373 k
pressure=1 bar
flow rate=50 L/hr
Property method - UNIFAC
Component	Mole fraction%
ETHANOL	0.5
WATER	0.5

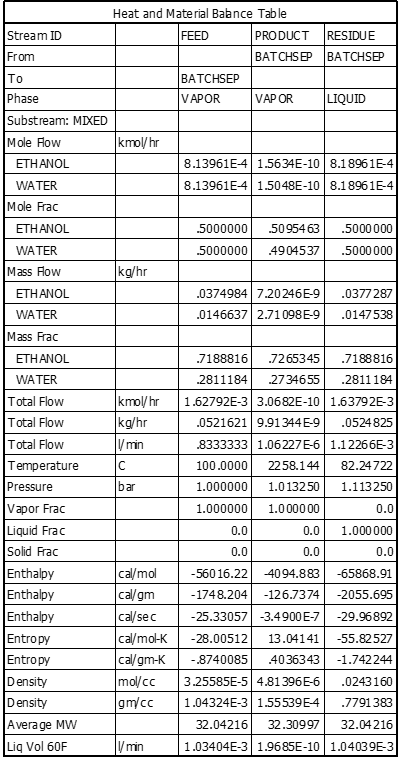
Figure 3:Result summary or streams table

- Specifying the components- add Ethanol and water from the components list
- Specifying the property method-UNIFAC
- Go to the simulation library
- Creating flowsheet with help of model library present in the software, for batch distillation choose batchfrac model form library( figure 2)
- Specifying input stream information that is temperature, pressure, Composition type and flow rate of the components

Temperature = 373 K, Pressure=1 bar

Flow basis = Volume( 50 L/hr)

Composition type = mole fraction

Ethanol - 0.5, Water – 0.5

- Specifying block information what type of distillation column is present (Pot +overhead condenser type)
- Configuring settings –types of global unit used – METCBR
- Running the simulation
- Viewing the result- check streams result or steam table obtain from the running the simulation (figure 3) Similarly we can do simulation for other distillation column like fractional distillation by using Redfrac model from model library present in the software.

== See also ==
- Flash distillation
- Fractional distillation
- Steam distillation
- Process optimization
- Process design
- Software Process simulation
- Modeling and simulation
- Computer simulation
- Advanced Simulation Library
- List of chemical process simulators
