= List of chemical process simulators =

This is a list of software used to simulate the material and energy balances of chemical process plants. Applications for this include design studies, engineering studies, design audits, debottlenecking studies, control system check-out, process simulation, dynamic simulation, operator training simulators, pipeline management systems, production management systems, digital twins.

Software	Developer	Applications	Operating System	License	URL
Advanced Simulation Library (ASL)	Avtech Scientific	Process data validation and reconciliation, real-time optimization, virtual sensing and predictive control	Windows, Linux, FreeBSD, Mac	open-source (AGPLv3)	
APMonitor	APMonitor	MATLAB/Python/Julia-based data reconciliation, real-time optimization, dynamic simulation and nonlinear predictive control	Windows, Linux	open-source (BSD-2-Clause)	
Apros	Fortum and VTT Technical Research Centre of Finland	Dynamic process simulation for power plants	Windows	closed-source	
ASCEND	ASCEND	Dynamic process simulation, general purpose language	Windows, BSD, Linux	open-source (GPLv2)	
Aspen Custom Modeler (ACM)	Aspen Technology	Dynamic process simulation	Windows	closed-source	
Aspen HYSYS	Aspen Technology	Process simulation and optimization	Windows	closed-source	
Aspen Plus	Aspen Technology	Process simulation and optimization	Windows	closed-source	
ASSETT	Kongsberg Digital	Dynamic process simulation	Windows	closed-source	
BatchColumn	Fives ProSim	Software for the Simulation and Optimization of batch distillation columns	Windows	closed-source	
BATCHES	Batch Process Technologies, Inc.	Simulation of recipe driven multiproduct and multipurpose batch processes for applications in design, scheduling and supply chain management	Linux	closed-source	
BatchReactor	Fives ProSim	Simulation software dedicated to reactors in batch mode	Windows	closed-source	
BILCO	CASPEO	Software to simulate mass balances using a data reconciliation algorithm	Windows	closed-source	
BioSTEAM	Yoel Cortes-Pena & BioSTEAM Development Group	Design, simulation, and costing of biorefineries under uncertainty	Windows, Mac, Linux	open-source (BSD-3-Clause)	
CADSIM Plus	Aurel Systems Inc.	Dynamic process simulator with CAD front end and process stream specification flexibility	Windows	closed-source	
ChromWorks	YPSO-FACTO	Chromatographic process design, simulation & optimization	Windows	closed-source	
CHEMCAD	Chemstations	Software suite for process simulation	Windows	closed-source	
CHEMPRO	EPCON	Process Flow Simulation, Fluid Flow Simulation, & Process Equipment Sizing	Windows	closed-source	
Cycad Process	CM Solutions	Process simulation and drawing package for minerals and metallurgical fields	Windows	closed-source	
Cycle-Tempo	Asimptote	Thermodynamic analysis and optimization of systems for the production of electricity, heat and refrigeration	Windows	closed-source	
COCO simulator + ChemSep	AmsterCHEM	Steady state process simulation based on CAPE-OPEN Interface Standard	Windows	Coco License 3.4	
D-SPICE	Kongsberg Digital	Dynamic process simulation	Windows	closed-source	
Design II for Windows	WinSim Inc.	Process simulation	Windows	closed-source	
Distillation expert trainer	ATR	Operator training simulator for distillation process		closed-source	
DPSIM	Dirceu Nascimento / EPM – Empresa de Processos Minerais	Mineral process simulation, steady-state flowsheet simulation, material and water balances, particle-size distribution modelling, and dynamic process simulation	Windows	freeware (Static Module)	
Dymola	Dassault Systèmes	Modelica-based dynamic modelling and simulation software	Windows, Linux	closed-source	
DynoChem	Scale-up Systems	Dynamic process simulation and optimization	Windows	closed-source	
DYNSIM	AVEVA	Dynamic process simulation	Windows	closed-source	
Dyssol	DyssolTEC	Dynamic flowsheet simulation of solids processes	Windows, Linux	open-source (BSD-3-Clause)	
DWSIM	Daniel Medeiros, Gustavo León and Gregor Reichert	Process simulator	Windows, Linux, macOS, Android, iOS	open-source (GPLv3), freemium	
EMSO	ALSOC Project	Modelling, simulation and optimisation, steady state and dynamic, equation oriented with open source models	Windows, Linux	closed-source (UI), open-source (library)	
EQ-COMP	Amit Katyal	Vapor Liquid Equilibrium Software	Software-as-a-Service	closed-source	[59]
FlowTran	FlowTran	Transient single phase pipeline simulation		closed-source	
GAMS	GAMS	General Algebraic Modeling System (GAMS)	Windows, Linux, Mac OS, Solaris	closed-source	
gPROMS	PSE Ltd	Advanced process simulation and modelling		closed-source	
HSC Sim	Outotec Oyj	Advanced process simulation and modelling, Flowsheet simulation	Windows	closed-source	
HYD-PREDIC	Amit Katyal	Multiphase flow assurance and hydrate modelling	Software-as-a-Service	closed-source	
HYDROFLO	Tahoe Design Software	Piping System Design with Steady State Analysis	Windows	closed-source	
Indiss Plus®	Corys	Dynamic process simulator for hydrocarbons, chemicals	Windows	closed-source	
ICAS	KT-Consortium	Integrated Computer-Aided System	Windows	closed-source	
IDEAS	Andritz Automation	Dynamic simulator for pulp, oil sands, potash, and hard rock mining	Windows	closed-source	
iiSE Simulator	iiSE company	Equation oriented chemical process simulator and optimizer	Windows, Linux	closed-source	
INOSIM	Inosim Software GmbH	Discrete-event dynamic simulation software for mixed batch-continuous processes in the chemical and pharmaceutical industry	Windows	closed-source	
INVIDES	Rheinmetall Electronics	Visual, dynamic Process Simulation framework for power plants, pipeline systems, upstream, midstream and downstream oil & gas plants, renewable energy plants and hydrogen plants	Windows	closed-source	[91]
IPSE GO	SimTech GmbH	Process simulation application that works in the browser, provides a visual flowsheet editor and supports online collaboration	Software-as-a-Service	closed-source	
IPSEpro	SimTech GmbH	Visual process simulation framework with ready-to-use model libraries for power systems, desalination, flue gas cleaning etc. and option to define own model libraries	Windows	closed-source	
iskra	Iskra Technologies	Vertical AI agents for industrial process systems for engineering design through procurement. AI-native browser-based process flowsheet simulator for chemical and energy systems. Built-in co-pilot that builds, solves, and explains steady-state flowsheets from natural language.	Software-as-a-Service	closed-source	
ITHACA	Element Process	General purpose dynamic (continuous and discrete-event) chemical process simulator.	Windows	freemium, closed-source	
JADE	GSE Systems	Dynamic process simulation	Windows	closed-source	
JModelica.org	Modelon AB	Process simulation	Windows, Linux, macOS	closed-source	
K-Spice	Kongsberg Digital	Dynamic process simulation	Windows	closed-source	
LedaFlow	Kongsberg Digital	Transient multiphase pipeline simulation	Windows	closed-source	
LIBPF	simevo	C++ Library for process flowsheeting	Linux, Windows, macOS	closed-source	
MaximaLabs.io	MaximaLabs	The AI-Native Process Simulator — From Flowsheet to Live Digital Twin	Browser Anywhere	closed-source	
METSIM	Metsim International	General-purpose dynamic and steady-state process simulation system	Windows	closed-source	
Modelon Impact	Modelon AB	General-purpose, multi-domain dynamic and steady-state process and system simulation system	Linux (SaaS, on-prem), Windows	closed-source	
Mimic Simulation Software	MYNAH Technologies	First-principles dynamic simulator built for software acceptance testing and operator training systems	Windows	closed-source	
Mobatec Modeller	Mobatec	Advanced Dynamic (Steady-State) Process Modelling Environment	Windows	closed-source	
NAPCON ProsDS	Neste Engineering Solutions Oy	Dynamic process simulation	Windows	closed-source	
OLGA	Schlumberger	Transient multiphase pipeline simulation	Windows	closed-source	
OLI Analyzer	OLI Systems, Inc.	Chemical phase equilibrium simulation featuring electrolytes	Windows	closed-source	
Omegaland	OMEGA Simulation	Dynamic process simulation	Windows	closed-source	
OptiRamp	Statistics & Control, Inc.	Real-time Process Simulation and Optimization, Multi variable Predictive Control	Windows	closed-source	
OpenModelica	Open-Source Modelica Consortium	General purpose simulation	Linux, macOS	open-source (OSMC-PL 1.2)	
PD-PLUS	Deerhaven Technical Software	Steady-State Modeling of Chemical, Petrochemical, and Refining Processes	Windows	closed-source	
PIPE-FLO Professional	Engineered Software Inc.	Piping System Simulation and Design	Windows	closed-source	
PIPEFLO	Schlumberger	Steady state multiphase flowline simulation	Windows	closed-source	
PIPESIM	Schlumberger	Steady state multiphase flowline simulation	Windows	closed-source	
PEL Suite	PEL Software	Steady state process simulation	Windows	closed-source	
Petro-SIM	KBC Advanced Technologies	Dynamic process simulation	Windows	closed-source	
PETROX	Petrobras	In-house steady state refining process simulator	Windows	closed-source	N/A
Power Plant Simulator & Designer	KED GmbH	Basic Engineering and Dynamic process simulation for power plants	Windows	closed-source	
Process Engineering ToolS (PETS)	Stratus Engineering, Inc.	Process Engineering Software	Windows	closed-source	
Process Studio	Stamicarbon	Simulation Suite for Modeling, Engineering & Training	Windows	closed-source	
Prode Properties	Prode Software	Thermodynamic Library, Properties of pure fluids and mixtures, Multi phase Equilibria + process simulation	Windows, Linux, Android	closed-source	
Prode Process Interface	Prode Software	Process simulation, optimization realtime control	Windows	closed-source	
ProMax	Bryan Research & Engineering	Process simulator capable of modeling oil & gas plants, refineries, and many chemical plants	Windows	closed-source	
ProPhyPlus	Fives ProSim	Thermodynamic calculation software	Windows	closed-source	
ProSec	Fives ProSim	Simulation software of brazed plate fin heat exchangers	Windows	closed-source	
ProSim DAC	Fives ProSim	Dynamic adsorption column simulation software	Windows	closed-source	
ProSimPlus	Fives ProSim	Software for steady-state simulation and optimization of processes	Windows	closed-source	
ProSimPlus Python API	Fives ProSim	Process simulator fully driven by Python	Windows	closed-source	
ProSimulator	Sim Infosystems	Process and Power plant simulation	Windows	closed-source	
ProTreat / SulphurPro	Optimized Gas Treating	Steady state simulation of amine gas sweetening, glycol dehydration, modified Claus SRUs, tail gas clean-up, and post-combustion carbon capture processes	Windows	closed-source	
PRO/II	AVEVA	Steady state process simulation	Windows	closed-source	
Pyomo	Sandia and UC Davis	Steady state and dynamic process simulation	All Platforms	open-source	
ROMeo	AVEVA	Process optimization	Windows	closed-source	
Reaction Lab	Scale-up Systems	Chemist-oriented kinetic modeling and reaction optimization	Windows	closed-source	
RecoVR	VRTech	Industrial wastewater management	Windows	closed-source	
REX	Optience	Reactor Optimization and Kinetic Estimation	Windows	closed-source	
AVEVA Process Simulation (former SimCentral)	AVEVA	Steady state, Fluid flow and Dynamic process simulator.	Windows	closed-source	
SimCreate	TSC Simulation	Real time, first principle and generic operator training simulations, plant specific emulations and OPC for live plant connections.	Windows	closed-source	
Simulis Thermodynamics	Fives ProSim	Mixture properties and fluid phase equilibria calculations add-in	Windows	closed-source	
SolidSim (Now in Aspen Plus)	SolidSim Engineering GmbH	Flowsheet simulation of solids processes	Windows	closed-source	
SPEEDUP	Aspen Technology	Dynamic process simulation	Unix, Windows	closed-source	
SuperPro Designer	Intelligen	Batch and continuous process simulation.	Windows	closed-source	
SysCAD	KWA Kenwalt Australia	Steady-state and dynamic process simulation	Windows	closed-source	
UniSim Design Suite	Honeywell	Process simulation and optimization	Windows	closed-source	
UniSim Competency Suite	Honeywell	Operator Competency Management and Training	Windows	closed-source	
USIM PAC	CASPEO	Steady-state simulation and optimization of processes	Windows	closed-source	
Virtuoso	Wood PLC	Multiphase dynamic process simulator for oil & gas production	Windows	closed-source	
VMG Symmetry	Schlumberger	Steady state simulation, dynamic process simulation, transient multiphase flowline simulation	Windows	closed-source	
Wolfram SystemModeler	Wolfram Research	Modelica-based Dynamic multidomain modelling (mechanical, electrical, chemical)	Windows, Mac, Linux	closed-source	
XPSIM	Process Simulation Services	Steady state and dynamic process simulation, transient multiphase pipeline simulator	Windows	closed-source	

== See also ==
- Chemical engineering
- Process simulation
- Process engineering
