= Paper engineering =

Science of paper and papermaking

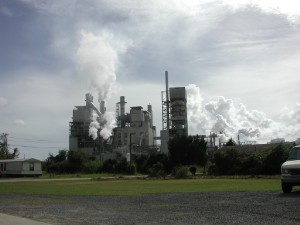
International Paper: Kraft paper mill

Paper engineering is a branch of engineering that deals with the usage of physical science (e.g. chemistry and physics) and life sciences (e.g. biology and biochemistry) in conjunction with mathematics as applied to the converting of raw materials into useful paper products and co-products. The field applies various principles in process engineering and unit operations to the manufacture of paper, chemicals, energy and related materials. The following timeline shows some of the key steps in the development of the science of chemical and bioprocess engineering:

From a heritage perspective, the field encompasses the design and analysis of a wide variety of thermal, chemical and biochemical unit operations employed in the manufacture of pulp and paper, and addresses the preparation of its raw materials from trees or other natural resources via a pulping process, chemical and mechanical pretreatment of these recovered biopolymer (e.g. principally, although not solely, cellulose-based) fibers in a fluid suspension, the high-speed forming and initial dewatering of a non-woven web, the development of bulk sheet properties via control of energy and mass transfer operations, as well as post-treatment of the sheet with coating, calendering, and other chemical and mechanical processes.

== Applications ==
Today, the field of paper and chemical engineering is applied to the manufacture of a wide variety of products. The forestry and biology, chemical science, (bio)chemical industry scope manufactures organic and agrochemicals (fertilizers, insecticides, herbicides), oleochemicals, fragrances and flavors, food, feed, pharmaceuticals, nutraceuticals, chemicals, polymers and power from biological materials.

The resulting products of paper engineering including paper, cardboard, and various paper derivatives are widely used in everyday life. In addition to being a subset of chemical engineering, the field of paper engineering is closely linked to forest management, product recycling, and the mass production of paper – based media.

== Methods ==
=== Mechanical pulping ===
In the process of mechanical pulping, "grinding" and "refining" are the two main methods used to create the pulp. Grinding is the method of pressing logs and chips against a turning stone to produce fibers. Refiner pulping is treating wood chips with chemicals or heat and then crushing the objects between two disks, one or both of which are rotating. There are four main types of refiner pulping, which includes refiner mechanical pulping, thermo-mechanical pulping, chemi-mechanical pulping, and chemithermomechanical pulping. Further descriptions of each process are contained in this link: Mechanical pulping, when compared to chemical pulping, is relatively inexpensive and has a high pulp yield (85–95%). However, the paper created is generally weak since it retains the lignin.

=== Chemical pulping ===
The process of chemical pulping is used to chemically disband the lignin found in the cell walls of the material undergoing the process. After the cellulose fibers are separated from the lignin, a pulp is created which can then be treated to create durable paper, boxes, and corrugated cardboard. Chemical pulping can be characterized by two main methods: sulfate (Kraft process) pulping and sulfite pulping, and these two methods have different benefits. Sulfate pulping can be performed on a wide range of tree varieties and results in the creation of a strong type of paper. Conversely, sulfite pulping results in a higher volume of pulp which is easier to bleach and process. However, sulfate pulping is more widely used since the product is more durable and the chemicals used in the process can be recovered, thus resulting in minimal environmental pollution.

=== Further pulp processing ===
The pulp is then processed through an apparatus which renders the pulp as a mesh of fibers. This fiber network is then pressed to remove all water contents, and the paper is subsequently dried to remove all traces of moisture.

=== Finishing ===
After the above processes have been completed, the resulting paper is coated with a minuscule amount of china clay or calcium carbonate to modify the surface, and the paper is then re-sized depending on its intended purpose.

=== Product recycling ===
Generally, the material to be recycled first undergoes mechanical or chemical pulping to render it in pulp form. The resulting pulp is then processed in the same way normal pulp is processed; however, original fiber is sometimes added to enhance the quality and appearance of the product.

== Related fields and topics ==
Today, the field of paper and bioprocess engineering is a diverse one, covering areas from biotechnology and nanotechnology to electricity generation.

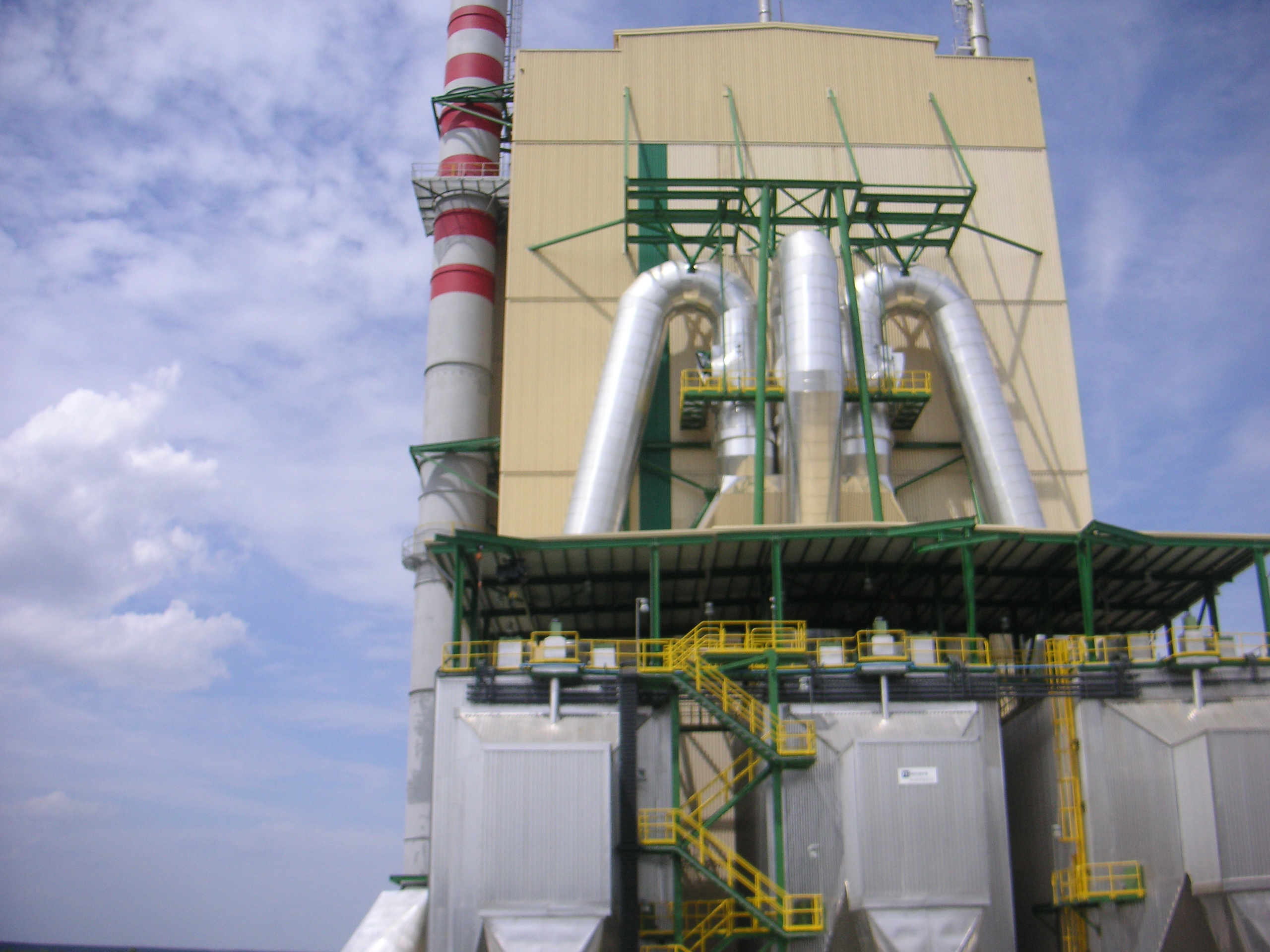
Paper engineers design, construct and operate plants

Cellulose is a natural biopolymer

- Agricultural engineering
- Biomolecular engineering
- Biochemical engineering
- Biological engineering
- Chemical process modeling
- Chemical engineering
- Chemical reactor
- Computational fluid dynamics
- Corrosion engineering
- Environmental engineering
- Fluid dynamics
- Food engineering
- Forest engineering
- Heat transfer
- Mass transfer
- Materials science
- Microfluidics
- Nanotechnology
- Natural environment
- Polymers
- Process control
- Process design
- Process development
- Safety engineering
- Separation processes
- Textile engineering
- Thermodynamics
- Transport phenomena
- Unit operations
- Water technology

== Colleges and universities ==
Generally offered as a specialization within chemical engineering:

- United States
  - Auburn University
  - Georgia Institute of Technology
  - Miami University
  - North Carolina State University
  - SUNY ESF
  - University of Maine
  - University of Minnesota
  - University of Washington
  - University of Wisconsin - Stevens Point
  - Western Michigan University
- Canada
  - École Polytechnique de Montréal
  - McGill University
  - McMaster University
  - University of British Columbia
  - University of New Brunswick
  - Université du Québec à Trois-Rivières
  - University of Toronto
- Europe
  - Universitat Politècnica de Catalunya, Spain
  - Darmstadt University of Technology, Germany
  - Dresden University of Technology, Germany
  - Grenoble INP, France
  - Helsinki University of Technology, Finland
  - Lund Institute of Technology, Sweden
  - Tampere University of Technology, Finland
  - Technische Universitat Graz, Austria
  - Technical University of Łódź, Poland
  - University of Manchester, UK
  - Åbo Akademi University, Finland
- Asia-Pacific
  - Monash University
  - Indian Institute of Technology, Roorkee
  - South China University of Technology

== See also ==
- Paper folding
- Chemical engineer
- List of notable chemical engineers
- List of chemical engineering societies
- American Institute of Chemical Engineers (AIChE)
- Chemistry and engineering
- Chemical engineering and polymer science
- Institution of Chemical Engineers (IChemE)
- Food and Bioprocess Technology
- Contemporary food engineering
- Education for chemical engineers
- English engineering units
- Process design (chemical engineering)
- List of chemical process simulators
- List of dynamic process simulators
