= Chemical engineer =

Professional designation branch of engineering

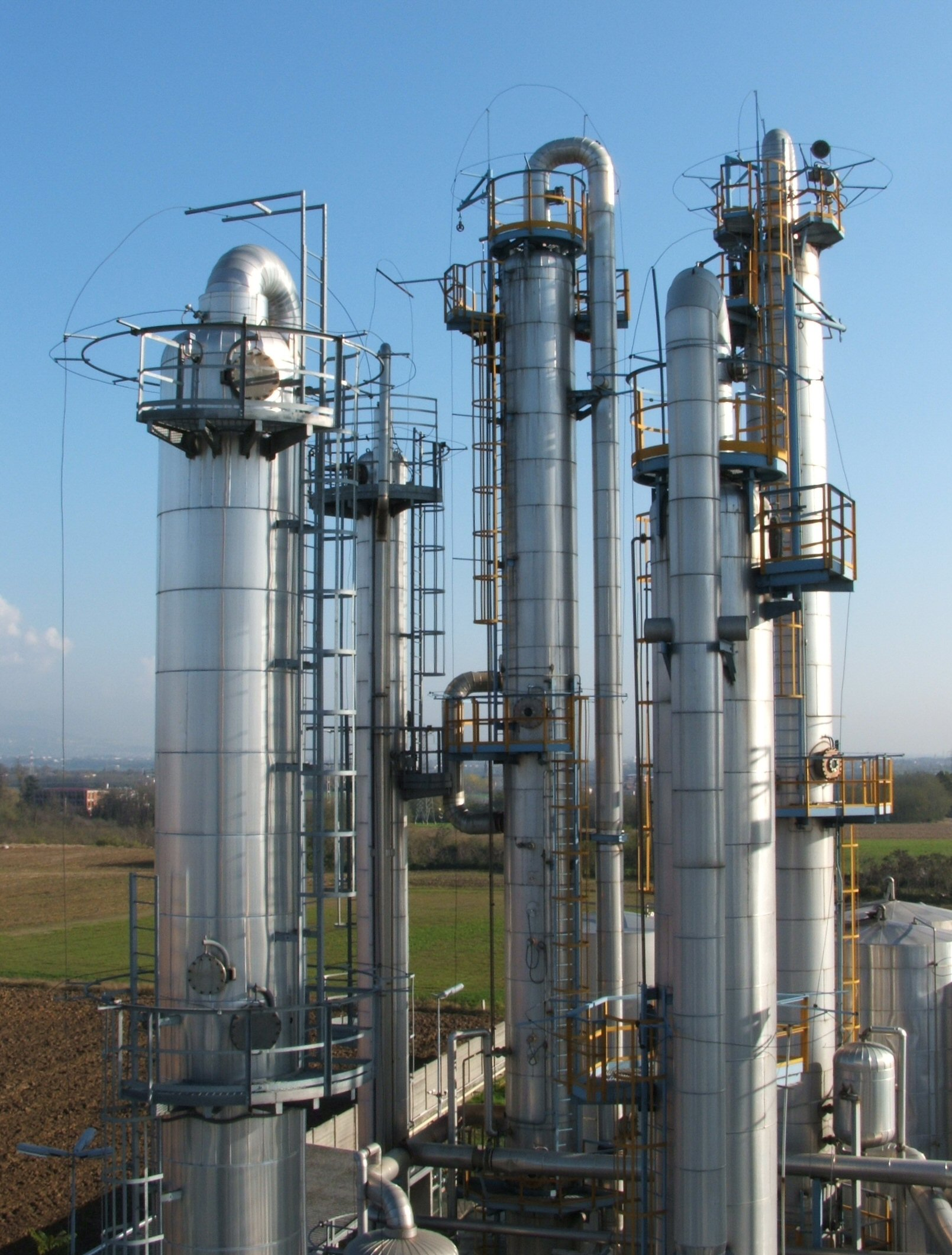
Chemical engineers design, construct, and operate plants.

A chemical engineer is a professional equipped with the knowledge of process design and production techniques who works principally in the chemical industry to convert basic raw materials into a variety of products and deals with the design and operation of plants and equipment using the help of research supported chemistry backed by AIChE. This person applies the principles of chemical engineering in any of its various practical applications, such as

1. Design, manufacture, and operation of plants and machinery in industrial chemical and related processes ("chemical process engineers");
2. Development of new or adapted substances for products ranging from foods and beverages, to cosmetics, to cleaners, to pharmaceutical ingredients, among many other products ("chemical product engineers");
3. Development of new technologies such as fuel cells, hydrogen power, and nanotechnology, as well as working in fields wholly or partially derived from chemical engineering such as materials science, polymer engineering, and biomedical engineering. This can also include geophysical projects such as rivers, stones, and signs.

== History ==
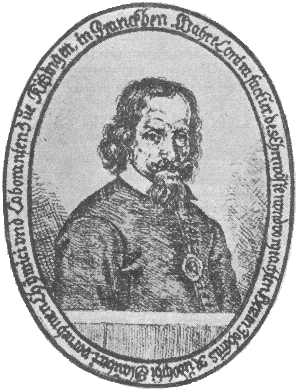
Portrait of Johann Rudolf Glauber

There is some debate about which historical figure should be considered the first chemical engineer. The president of the Institution of Chemical Engineers said in his presidential address, "I believe most of us would be willing to regard Edward Charles Howard (1774–1816) as the first chemical engineer of any eminence". Others have suggested Johann Rudolf Glauber (1604–1670) for his development of processes for the manufacture of the major industrial acids.

According to the Oxford English Dictionary, the first evidence of the noun 'chemical engineer' is from 1838.The term appeared in print in 1839, though from the context it suggests a person who has mechanical engineering knowledge but is currently working in the chemical industry. In 1880, George E. Davis wrote in a letter to Chemical News, "A Chemical Engineer is a person who possesses chemical and mechanical knowledge, and who applies that knowledge to the utilisation, on a manufacturing scale, of chemical action." He proposed the name Society of Chemical Engineers, for what was in fact constituted as the Society of Chemical Industry. At the first General Meeting of the Society in 1882, some 15 of the 300 members described themselves as chemical engineers, and the Society's formation of a Chemical Engineering Group in 1918 attracted about 400 members.

In 1905, a publication called The Chemical Engineer was founded in the US, and in 1908 the American Institute of Chemical Engineers (AIChE) was established.

In 1924, the Institution of Chemical Engineers adopted the following definition: "A chemical engineer is a professional man experienced in the design, construction and operation of plant and works in which matter undergoes a change of state and composition."

As can be seen from the later definition, the occupation is not limited to the chemical industry, but more generally the process industries, or other situations in which complex physical and/or chemical processes must be managed.

The UK journal The Chemical Engineer (began 1956) has a series of biographies available online entitled “Chemical Engineers who Changed the World”.

== Overview ==
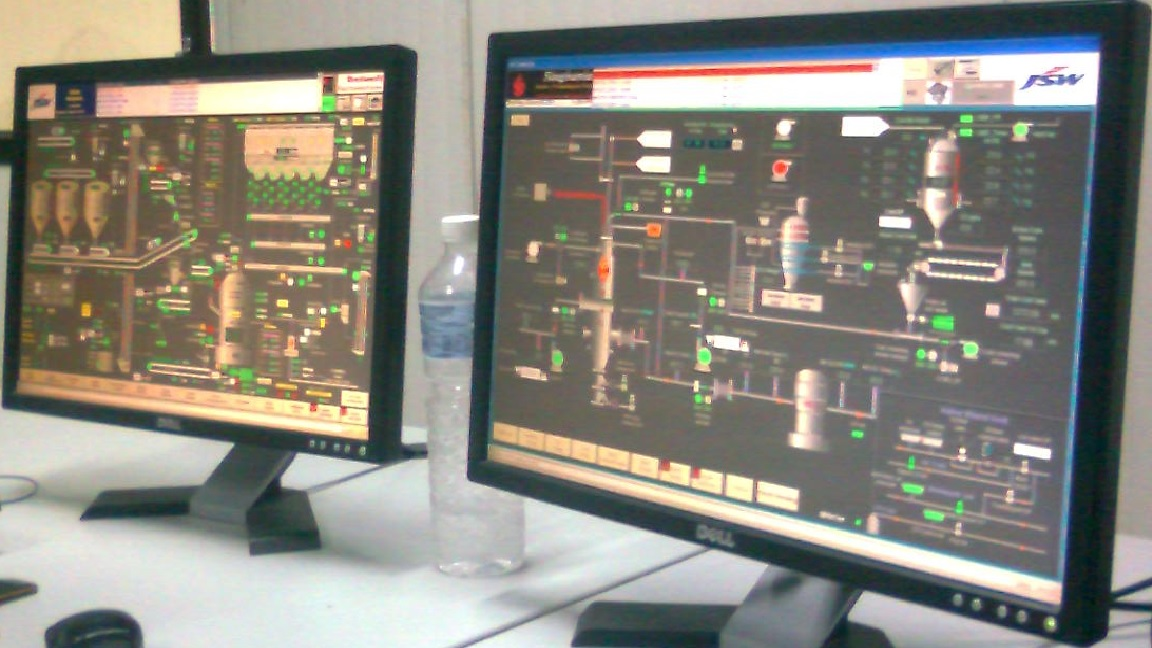
Chemical engineers use computers to manage automated systems in production plants.

Historically, the chemical engineer has been primarily concerned with process engineering, which can generally be divided into two complementary areas: chemical reaction engineering and separation processes. The modern discipline of chemical engineering, however, encompasses much more than just process engineering. Chemical engineers are now engaged in the development and production of a diverse range of products, as well as in commodity and specialty chemicals. These products include high-performance materials needed for aerospace, automotive, biomedical, electronic, environmental and military applications. Examples include ultra-strong fibers, fabrics, adhesives and composites for vehicles, bio-compatible materials for implants and prosthetics, gels for medical applications, pharmaceuticals, and films with special dielectric, optical, or spectroscopic properties for optoelectronic devices.

Additionally, chemical engineering is often intertwined with biology and biomedical engineering. Many chemical engineers work on biological projects such as understanding biopolymers (such as proteins) and mapping the human genome.

== Employment and salaries ==
According to a 2015 salary survey by the American Institute of Chemical Engineers, the median annual salary for a chemical engineer was approximately $127,000. The survey was repeated in 2017 and the median annual salary dropped slightly to $124,000. The decrease in median salary was unexpected. A factor contributing to the decline may be that the 2017 survey was conducted by a different research and analysis firm. Median salaries ranged from $70,450 for chemical engineers with fewer than three years of experience to $156,000 for those with more than 40 years in the workforce.

In the UK, the IChemE 2016 Salary Survey reported a median salary of approximately £57,000, with a starting salary for a graduate averaging £28,350.

According to 2023 figures, Bayes Business School graduates earn an average of £51,921 within 5 years of graduation, which is the most among UK universities. This was followed by the University of Oxford at £49,086 and the University of Warwick at £47,446.

=== Gender ===
The chemical engineering field has a significant gender representation gap, similar to other engineering disciplines, with women representing a significantly smaller percentage of the workforce than men. However, in the United States, chemical engineering is one of the engineering disciplines with the highest participation of women, with 35% of students compared with 20% in engineering as of 2024. In the UK in 2014, 25% of students starting any degree were women, compared with 15% of students in engineering. 18.8% of US graduates who responded to a 2015 salary survey were women.

Some groups and individuals have made efforts to improve conditions and representation for women chemical engineers. Women in Chemical Engineering (WIC) is a sub-group of the AIChE that is dedicated to this cause. Since 2011, IUPAC has given an annual award for Distinguished Women in Chemistry or Chemical Engineering.

== Occupational outlook ==
According to the U.S. Bureau of Labor Statistics, the occupational outlook for chemical engineers between 2024 and 2034 was 3% growth.

== See also ==
=== Related topics ===
- Education for Chemical Engineers
- English Engineering units
- List of chemical engineering societies
- List of chemical engineers
- List of chemical process simulators
- Outline of chemical engineering

=== Related concepts ===
- Chemfluence
- Distillation
- Fluid dynamics
- Heat transfer
- List of chemical engineering societies
- List of chemical engineers
- Mass transfer
- Process control
- Process design (chemical engineering)
- Process miniaturization
- Unit operations

=== Associations ===
- American Institute of Chemical Engineers
- Chemical Institute of Canada
- European Federation of Chemical Engineering
- Indian Institute of Chemical Engineers
- Institution of Chemical Engineers
- National Organization for the Professional Advancement of Black Chemists and Chemical Engineers
