= List of chemical engineering societies =

This is the list of chemical engineering societies in the world. They are sorted by continent and alphabetically. They include national or international ones, but not student societies or those otherwise restricted to a particular university or institution.

== Africa ==
- Ethiopian Society of Chemical Engineers (ESChE), Ethiopia
- Nigerian Society of Chemical Engineers
- South African Institution of Chemical Engineers (SAIChE), South Africa

== Asia ==
- Asia Pacific Confederation of Chemical Engineering (APCChE)
- Iranian Association of Chemical Engineering (IAChE) , I.R. Iran
- Indian Institute of Chemical Engineers (IIChe), India
- Israel Institute of Chemical Engineers (IIChe), Israel
- Korean Chemical Society (KCS), Korea
- Korean Institute of Chemical Engineers (ko) (KIChE), Korea
- Pakistan Institute of Chemical Engineers (PICHE), Pakistan
- Philippine Institute of Chemical Engineers (PIChE), Philippines
- Society of Chemical Engineers, Japan (SCEJ) (ja), Japan
- Society of Chemical Engineers of Nepal, Kathmandu, Nepal
- Taiwan Institute of Chemical Engineering (TwIChE), Taiwan
- Thai Institute of Chemical Engineering and Applied Chemistry (TIChE), Thailand

== Europe ==
- European Federation of Chemical Engineering (EFCE) (umbrella organization)
- Associazione Italiana Di Ingegneria Chimica (AIDIC), Italy
- Chamber of Chemical Engineers, Turkey
- DECHEMA, Germany
- Institution of Chemical Engineers (IChemE), UK
- Société Française de Génie des Procédés (SFGP), France

== North America ==
- American Chemical Society (ACS)
- American Institute of Chemical Engineers (AIChE)
- Association of Energy Engineers (AEE)
- Canadian Society for Chemical Engineering (CSChE)
- National Organization for the Professional Advancement of Black Chemists and Chemical Engineers (NOBCChE)
- Mexican Institute of Chemical Engineers (IMIQ), Mexico

== Oceania ==
- The Australian and New Zealand Federation of Chemical Engineers (ANZFChE)
- Engineers Australia Chemical College, Australia
- Society of Chemical Engineers New Zealand

== South America ==
- Argentinian Association for Chemical Engineers, Argentina
- Brazilian Association of Chemical Engineering, Brazil
- Colombian Association of Chemical Engineering, Colombia
- Association of Chemical Engineers of Uruguay, Uruguay
