= Thai Institute of Chemical Engineering and Applied Chemistry =

Thai chemical engineering organization

Coordinates: 13.736786°N 100.533143°E

The Thai Institute of Chemical Engineering and Applied Chemistry (TIChE) (Thai: สมาคมวิศวกรรมเคมีและเคมีประยุกต์แห่งประเทศไทย, สวคท.) is a professional organization for chemical engineers. TIChE was established in 1996 to distinguish chemical engineers as a profession independent of chemists and mechanical engineers.

== History ==
TIChE was established to force the chemical engineering professional certificate isolated from the industrial engineering. The conference in 1990 was the first effort to establish the organization by the cooperation of Department of Chemical Engineering and Department of Chemical Technology, Chulalongkorn University, and Department of Chemical Engineering, King Mongkut's University of Technology Thonburi. In the 4th conference at Khon Kaen University, 1994, TIChE was formally established and permitted by law on November 15, 1996. Now, TIChE composes 18 university members.

== The Objectives of TIChE ==
- To promote and support the chemical engineering and chemical technology profession.
- To promote and support the educational standard of chemical engineering and chemical technology.
- To encourage cooperation and industrial development including research and knowledge.
- To disseminate knowledge and consulting in chemical engineering and chemical technology.
- To be an agent of chemical engineering and chemical technology profession to cooperate with other organizations.

== University Members ==
(sorted alphabetically)

- Burapha University
  - Department of Chemical Engineering
- Chiang Mai University
  - Department of Industrial Chemistry
- Chulalongkorn University
  - Department of Chemical Engineering
  - Department of Chemical Technology
  - The Petroleum and Petrochemical College
- Kasetsart University
  - Department of Chemical Engineering
- Khon Kaen University
  - Department of Chemical Engineering
- King Mongkut's Institute of Technology Ladkrabang
  - Department of Chemical Engineering
- King Mongkut's University of Technology North Bangkok
  - Department of Chemical Engineering
  - Department of Industrial Chemistry
- King Mongkut's University of Technology Thonburi
  - Department of Chemical Engineering
- Mahanakorn University of Technology
  - Department of Chemical Engineering
- Mahidol University
  - Department of Chemical Engineering
- Prince of Songkla University
  - Department of Chemical Engineering
- Rajamangala University of Technology Thanyaburi (Klong 6)
  - Department of Chemical Engineering
- Rangsit University
  - Department of Chemical and Material Engineering
- Silpakorn University
  - Department of Chemical Engineering
- Srinakharinwirot University
  - Department of Chemical Engineering
- Suranaree University of Technology
  - School of Chemical Engineering
- Thammasat University
  - Department of Chemical Engineering
- Ubon Ratchathani University
  - Department of Chemical Engineering

== List of Conference Meetings ==
- 7th International Thai Institute of Chemical Engineering and Applied Chemistry Conference (ITIChE 2017) and The 27th National Thai Institute of Chemical Engineering and Applied Chemistry Conference (TIChE 2017)
  - 18–20 October 2017 Shangri-La Hotel, Bangkok
- The 18th Thailand Chemical Engineering and Applied Chemistry Conference.
  - 20–21 October 2008 at Jomtien Palm Beach Resort, Cholburi.
  - Host: Department of Chemical Engineering, Mahidol University, Nakhon Pathom.
- The 17th Thailand Chemical Engineering and Applied Chemistry Conference.
  - 29–30 October 2007 at The Empress Hotel, Chiang Mai.
  - Host: Department of Industrial Chemistry, Chiang Mai University, Chiang Mai.
- The 16th Thailand Chemical Engineering and Applied Chemistry Conference.
  - 26–27 October 2006 at Rama Garden Hotel, Bangkok.
  - Host: Department of Chemical Engineering, Kasetsart University, Bangkok.
- The 15th Thailand Chemical Engineering and Applied Chemistry Conference.
  - 27–28 October 2005 at Jomtien Palm Beach Resort, Cholburi.
  - Host: Department of Chemical Engineering, Burapha University, Cholburi.
- The 14th Thailand Chemical Engineering and Applied Chemistry Conference.
  - Host: Department of Chemical Engineering, King Mongkut's Institute of Technology North Bangkok, Bangkok.
- The 13th Thailand Chemical Engineering and Applied Chemistry Conference.
  - 30–31 October 2003 at Royal Hill Resort and Golf Course, Nakhon Nayok.
  - Host: Department of Chemical Engineering, Srinakharinwirot University, Nakhon Nayok.

== Website ==
- Official website
