= SEKA Paper Museum =

Museum in Turkey

- SEKA Kağıt Müzesi
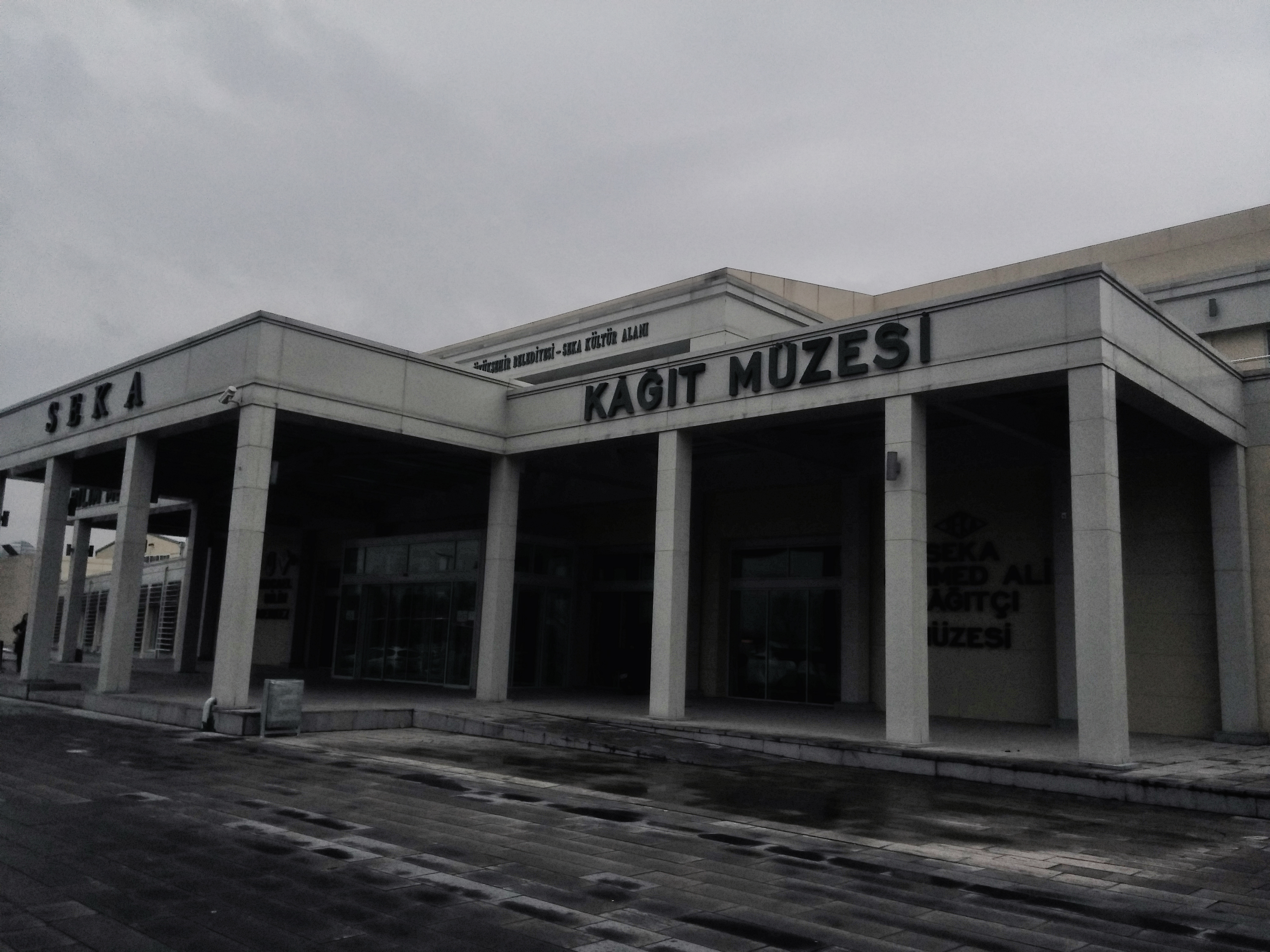
- Museum's entrance.

- Location within Turkey
- Established: November 6, 2016
- Location: Kocaeli, Turkey
- Coordinates: 40°45′40″N 29°54′35″E
- Owner: Metropolitan Municipality of Kocaeli
- Website: sekakagitmuzesi.com

The SEKA Paper Museum, a.k.a. SEKA Mehmet Ali Kağıtçı Paper Museum (Turkish: SEKA Kağıt Müzesi or SEKA Mehmet Ali Kağıtçı Kağıt Müzesi), is a museum of industrial heritage in Kocaeli district (İzmit), northwestern Turkey. Situated in a former pulp and paper mill, it is dedicated to papermaking in Turkey. The museum was opened in 2016.

== Background ==
Construction of the pulp and paper mill began with groundbreaking on August 18, 1934. The mill was built as part of the industrialization efforts during the early years of modern Turkey. The first domestic paper was produced on April 18, 1936. Named Sümerbank İzmit Kağıt ve Karton Fabrikası (Sümerbank İzmit Paper and Cardboard Mill), it officially went into production, with an annual capacity of 12,000 tons, on November 6, 1936. Turkey's first paper engineer, Mehmet Ali Kağıtçı, played a major role in the foundation of the paper mill. On June 21, 1955, it was renamed Türkiye Sellükoz ve Kağıt Fabrikaları (Turkish Cellulose and Paper Mills). In 1997, the state-owned mill was listed for privatization and investment ceased. Paper production came to a halt in 2005, and it was transferred to the Metropolitan Municipality of Kocaeli. The word SEKA is a portmanteau of SEllüloz (for cellulose or pulp) and KAğıt (paper).

== Museum ==
Exactly 80 years after its establishment, the mill was redeveloped into a museum by the Metropolitan Municipality of Kocaeli on November 6, 2016. It is the country's first, and the world's largest, paper museum, and it is named after the founder of the mill, Mehmet Ali Kağıtçı. The museum consists of 16 halls in a four-story building, constructed on an area of 12,345 m^{2} (132,880 sq ft). The museum contains 115 displays containing 443 documents, 337 objects and many photos, painstakingly selected from tens of thousands. Machinery and equipment used in the papermaking process are an essential part of the museum. Five printing machines were repaired and are on display, one of which worked continuously for 70 years. The museum also contains workshops for traditional papermaking, paper craft and paper art such as origami, kirigami, paper painting, calligraphy, miniature art, manuscript illumination and paper marbling. There are sculptures created from recycled materials.

In a hall in the building's basement, the social life at the SEKA mill is narrated. The ground floor contains a lobby, turbine room, power plant, rooms for grinding, stock preparation, and cleaning, paper machine hall, Mehmed Ali Kâğıtçı Memorial Hall, temporary exhibition hall and greenhouse for plants used in papermaking. The two halls of the first floor are for pulp preparation and printing. On the second floor, there are two halls for high-density pulp towers and a screen room.

A cloakroom, gift shops, cafeteria and restaurant are found in the entrance section of the museum.
