= SFGP =

SFGP may refer to:

- Société Française de Génie des Procédés (French Society of Process Engineers)
- Special Forces Group (Japan), a Japanese special forces unit
