= DCDS =

DCDS may refer to:

- Detroit Country Day School, a private school
- DECHEMA Chemistry Data Series, a series of books with thermophysical data published by DECHEMA
- Deputy Chief of the Defence Staff
