= Wood processing =

First stage of production from raw wood to wood semi-finished goods

Wood processing is an engineering discipline in the wood industry comprising the production of forest products, such as pulp and paper, construction materials, and tall oil. Paper engineering is a subfield of wood processing.

The major wood product categories are: sawn timber, wood-based panels, wood chips, paper and paper products and miscellaneous others including poles and railway sleepers.

Forest product processing technologies have undergone extraordinary advances in some of the above categories. Improvements have been achieved in recovery rates, durability and protection, greater utilization of NTFPs such as various grain stalks and bamboo, and the development of new products such as reconstituted wood-panels. Progress has not been homogeneous in all the forest product utilization categories. Although there is little information available on the subjects of technology acquisition, adaptation and innovation for the forest-based industrial sector, it is clear that sawmilling has been far less affected by the spread of innovations than the manufacturing of panel products.

== See also ==
- Engineered wood
- Wood product
- Wood flooring
