= Jürgen Seibel =

German chemist

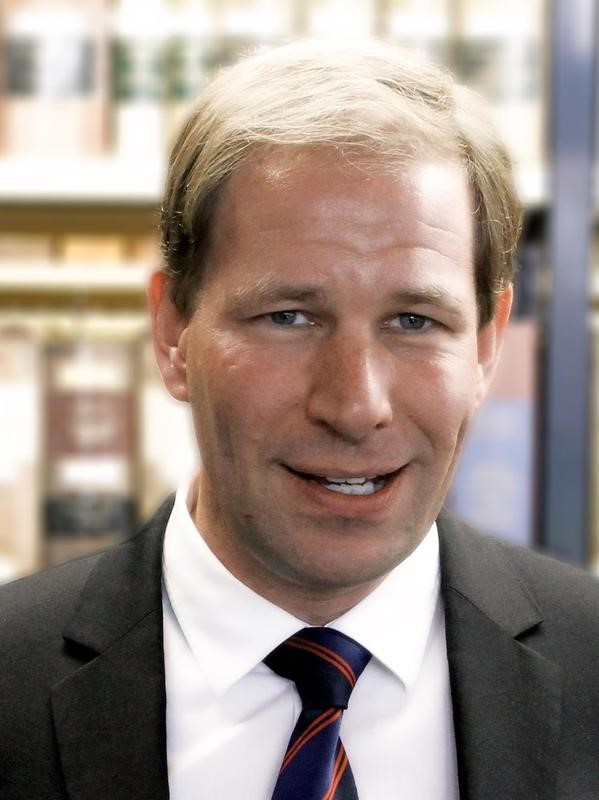
- Prof. Dr. Jürgen Seibel
- Born: May 9, 1971 (age 55); Eschwege, Hesse, Germany
- Education: University of Göttingen
- Scientific career
- Workplaces: Julius-Maximilians-Universität Würzburg

Jürgen Seibel (born 9 May 1971 in Eschwege, Hesse) is a German chemist. He is Professor of Organic Chemistry at Julius-Maximilians-Universität Würzburg

== Life and academic career ==
Seibel studied chemistry at the University of Göttingen from 1992 to 1997 and obtained his doctorate in 2000 under Lutz Friedjan Tietze at the Institute of Organic Chemistry there. The subject of his doctoral thesis was antibody-catalyzed asymmetric synthesis of vitamin E.

In 2000 Seibel moved to Oxford University, where he conducted research at Dyson Perrins Laboratory.

From 2002 to 2009 he was a university assistant at the Helmholtz Centre for Infection Research and at the Faculty of Chemistry and Pharmacy at the Technical University of Braunschweig, where he habilitated with the topic “Werkzeuge der Glycomics: Chemische und enzymatische Glycosylierungsmethoden zu Synthese und Nachweis biologisch relevanter Glycokonjugate” (Tools of Glycomics: Chemical and Enzymatic Glycosylation Methods for the Synthesis and Detection of Biologically Relevant Glycoconjugates). In the same year he was appointed private lecturer.

Since 2009 he has been a professor at the Institute of Organic Chemistry at Julius-Maximilians-Universität Würzburg.

Jürgen Seibel's main areas of work include the development of chemical and enzymatic syntheses, biocatalysis, protein engineering, drug delivery, sphingololipids and glycosciences. He also works on methods for bioorthogonal chemistry on living systems. He is the editor of the Journal of Nature Research C.

== Academic distinctions ==
- 2000 Glaxo Wellcome Scholarship, Glaxo Wellcome GmbH & Co. KG
- 2008 Jochen Block Award of DECHEMA
- 2012 DuPont Young Professor Award

== Research activities ==
- Since 2020 Spokesperson of the Research Training Group (RTG 2581) “Metabolism, topology and compartmentalization of membrane proximal lipid and signaling components in infection”
- Since 2020 Member of the Center for Infection Research (ZINF), Würzburg, Germany
- Since 2019 Member of the Editorial Board Scientific Reports
- Since 2018 member of the DFG-funded CRC/TRR 225 Biofabrication, Project B05
- 2011–2014 President of the Gesellschaft Deutscher Chemiker (German Chemical Society, GDCh), Lower Franconia chapter

== Selected publications ==
- Jürgen Seibel: Enantioselektive Antikörper-katalysierte Synthese von Vitamin E, Analoga & Entwicklung eines Immunoassays zur qualitativen & quantitativen Bestimmung v. Vitamin E. Cuvillier Verlag, Göttingen 2000, ISBN 3-89712-910-8
- M. Kraus, J. Görl, M. Timm, J. Seibel: Synthesis of the rare disaccharide nigerose by structure-based design of a phosphorylase mutant with altered regioselectivity. In: Chem. Commun. Band 52, 2016, S. 4625–4627. doi:10.1039/C6CC00934D.
- S. Letschert, A. Göhler, C. Franke, N. Bertleff-Zieschang, E. Memmel, S. Doose, J. Seibel, M. Sauer: Super-Resolution Imaging of Plasma Membrane Glycans. In: Angew. Chem. Int. Ed. Band 53, 2014, S. 10921–10924. doi:10.1002/anie.201406045
- U. Bornscheuer, K. Buchholz, J. Seibel: Enzymatic Degradation of (Ligno)cellulose. In: Angew. Chem. Int. Ed. Band 53, 2014, S. 10876–10893. doi:10.1002/anie.201309953
- J. Seibel: ZNC opens a new chapter focussing on the emerging field of natural and natural-like compounds. In: Zeitschrift für Naturforschung C. Band 71, Nr. 5–6, 2016, S. 93–93. doi:10.1515/znc-2016-0101.
- SiaNAl can be efficiently incorporated in glycoproteins of human mesenchymal stromal cells by metabolic glycoengineering. Jürgen Mut, Stephan Altmann, Sabine Reising, Jutta Meißner-Weigl, Marc D. Driessen*, Regina Ebert, and Jürgen Seibel doi:10.1021/acsbiomaterials.2c01534
- Nina Geiger, Louise Kersting, Jan Schlegel, Linda Stelz, Sofie Fähr, Viktoria Diesendorf, Valeria Roll, Marie Sostmann, Eva-Maria König, Sebastian Reinhard, Daniela Brenner, Sibylle Schneider-Schaulies, Markus Sauer, Jürgen Seibel and Jochen Bodem. The Acid Ceramidase Is a SARS-CoV-2 Host Factor, Cells 2022, 11(16), 2532 doi:10.3390/cells11162532
- Sibylle Schneider-Schaulies, Fabian Schumacher, Dominik Wigger, Marie Schöl, Trushnal Waghmare, Jan Schlegel, Jürgen Seibel and Burkhard Kleuser. Sphingolipids: Effectors and Achilles Heals in Viral Infections?, Cells 2021, 10(9), 2175 doi:10.3390/cells10092175
- Ralph Götz, Tobias Kunz, Julian Fink, Franziska Solger, Jan Schlegel, Jürgen Seibel, Vera Kozjak-Pavlovic, Thomas Rudel, Markus Sauer. Nanoscale imaging of bacterial infections by sphingolipid expansion microscopy. Nat Commun 2020, 11, 6173 doi:10.1038/s41467-020-19897-1
