= ROMeo (process optimizer) =

- Developer(s): SimSci, Invensys, Schneider Electric, AVEVA
- Operating system: Microsoft Windows
- Type: Steady State, Chemical Process Optimization
- License: Proprietary
- Website: ROMeo Official Homepage

ROMeoRigorous Online Modelling and Equation Based Optimization is an advanced online chemical process optimizer of SimSci, a brand of Aveva software It is mainly used by process engineers in the chemical, petroleum and natural gas industries.

It includes a chemical component library, thermodynamic property prediction methods, and unit operations such as distillation columns, heat exchangers, compressors, and reactors as found in the chemical processing industries. It can perform steady state mass and energy balance calculations for modeling, simulating and optimizing continuous processes.

ROMeo 6.0 has been released with increased access to native Refinery Process Models based on technology from ExxonMobil.

From ROMeo 7.0, ROMeo changed from 32 bit to 64bit.

ROMeo changed the name to AVEVA Process Optimization from 2020 version.

== See also ==
- List of chemical process simulators
