= Ralf Gathmann =

German entrepreneur (born 1965)

- Born: 4 June 1965 (age 60)
- Occupation: CEO of CORYS

Ralf Gathmann (born 4 June 1965) is a German entrepreneur. Gathmann is the chief executive officer of CORYS, which supplies training and engineering simulators to Transportation, Power, Oil&Gas and Chemical industries. He is also the chairman of the board of Corys Inc (USA), Corys India Simulation Systems Pvt Ltd (India), HKD (China), HyperionRsi Simulation (Cyprus). He holds a master's degree in Physics and a Ph.D. degree in engineering mechanics.

== Career ==
In 1993, Gathmann joined Corys R & D. He did well working in the company and two years later, in 1995, he became a Deputy Technical Director. Later he took the position of Director of the Rail Sector Business Unit and since 2003, he held the position of Deputy Chief Operating Officer. Ralf Gathmann is appointed as a Managing Director of Corys in 2008.

He developed the rail business and boosted its international expansion, before joining the operational management, the general management and then the positions of CEO in 2009.

In 2000, Ralf Gathmann was appointed to Rail Training International Limited. He worked there until 2007.

=== Corys ===
Corys is a French company based in Grenoble, is a world reference in training and engineering simulators.

== See also ==
- Corys
- Grenoble
