= Engineered Software, Inc. =

American software company

- Type: Private
- Industry: Computer software IT Consulting; Publishing
- Founded: April 1982 Incorporated May 1987
- Headquarters: Lacey, Washington, U.S.
- Key people: Ray Hardee, P.E., Co-Founder & CEO; Carolyn Popp, Co-Founder, President & CTO
- Products: PIPE-FLO product line PUMP-FLO product line Fluid Fundamentals Training products Flow of Fluids branded software
- Subsidiaries: PUMP-FLO Solutions; Fluid Fundamentals Training; ESI Press; Flow of Fluids
- Website: www.eng-software.com

Engineered Software, Inc. is a software publisher and engineering products company based in Lacey, Washington founded in 1982. The company develops hydraulic analysis software specialized for piping system design based mainly on the Darcy-Weisbach equation, and centrifugal pump selection using the pump affinity rules. Industries served by these segments includes: aerospace and defense, chemical processing, engineering design and consulting, food and beverage, oil and petrochemical, mining and metals, pharmaceutical, power generation, pulp and paper, wastewater collection and treatment and education. Its business segments are software including SAAS, industrial training, publications and technical support.

== History ==
The company was one of the leading manufacturers of Windows and Web-based pump selection software products, until that division was split in 2002, and now operates as the brand PUMP-FLO Solutions.

The company is best known to the consumer public as the manufacturer of PIPE-FLO software. Their PIPE-FLO program has proprietary file extension .pipe and cannot be opened in any other programs including the viewer type program which uses a .psv extension.

In 2008, Engineered Software, Inc. expanded their engineering products to include training courses and publications, sold under the brand name Fluid Fundamentals Training.

In 2006, Engineered Software, Inc. entered a four-year agreement with Crane Valve North America (Now known as the Crane Company) to publish their Technical Paper Number 410 (TP410). Crane agreed to allow Engineered Software to provide the Flow of Fluids Premium software in the Crane manual.

Crane Fluid Handling later partnered with Engineered Software on a rewrite of their Crane TP410 in 2009 and the company still holds the only contract with Crane Fluid Handling to market, sell and produce the guide for the Crane Co. under the Flow of Fluids brand.

In 2007 the company became a member of the educational non-profit, Pump Systems Matter™.

Engineered Software's CEO, Ray Hardee, P.E., was recognized in 2008 by the Hydraulic Institute (HI) for contributions on the Hydraulic Institute/Pump Systems Matter committee, which led to publication of "Optimizing Pumping Systems Guidebook" (OPS).

The company's CEO was also a member of the committee that wrote the standard ASME EA-2-2009 Energy Assessment for Pumping Systems. He is the author of Piping System Fundamentals: The Complete Guide to Gaining a Clear Picture of Your Piping System.
