= Semibatch reactor =

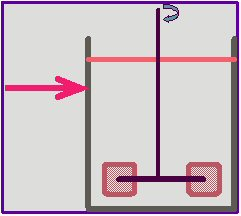
Semibatch reactor

For both chemical and biological engineering, Semibatch (semiflow) reactors operate much like batch reactors in that they take place in a single stirred tank with similar equipment. However, they are modified to allow reactant addition and/or product removal in time.

A normal batch reactor is filled with reactants in a single stirred tank at time $t=0$ and the reaction proceeds. A semi batch reactor, however, allows partial filling of reactants with the flexibility of adding more as time progresses. Stirring in both types is very efficient, which allows batch and semi batch reactors to assume a uniform composition and temperature throughout.

== Advantages ==
The flexibility of adding more reactants over time through semi batch operation has several advantages over a batch reactor. These include:

=== Improved selectivity of a reaction ===
Sometimes a particular reactant can go through parallel paths that yield two different products, only one of which is desired. Consider the simple example below:

A→U (desired product)
A→W (undesired product)

The rate expressions, considering the variability of the volume of reaction, are:

$V \frac{dC_A}{dt} + C_A \frac{dV}{dt}$ = $F_A$ - $k_1$ $C_A^\alpha$

$V \frac{dC_U}{dt} + C_U \frac{dV}{dt}$ = $k_1$ $C_A^\alpha$ - $F_U$

$V \frac{dC_W}{dt} + C_W \frac{dV}{dt}$ = $k_2$ $C_A^\beta$ - $F_W$

Where $F_A$ is the molar rate of addition of the reactant A. Note that the presence of these addition terms, which could be negative in case of products removal (e.g. by fractional distillation) are the ones marking the difference of the semi batch reactor cases from the simpler batch cases. For standard batch reactors (no addition terms) the selectivity of the desired product is defined as:

S = $\frac{d(VC_U)}{d(VC_W)}$ = $\frac{k_1}{k_2}C_A^{\alpha-\beta}$

S = $\frac{dC_U}{dC_W}$ = $\frac{k_1}{k_2}C_A^{\alpha-\beta}$ for constant volume (i.e. batch) reactions.

If $\beta > \alpha$, the concentration of the reactant should be kept at a low level in order to maximize selectivity. This can be accomplished using a semibatch reactor.

=== Better control of exothermic reactions ===
Exothermic reactions release heat, and ones that are highly exothermic can cause safety concerns. Semibatch reactors allow for slow addition of reactants in order to control the heat released and thus, temperature, in the reactor.

=== Product removal through a purge stream ===
In order to minimize the reversibility of a reaction one must minimize the concentration of the product. This can be done in a semibatch reactor by using a purge stream to remove products and increase the net reaction rate by favoring the forward reaction.

== Reactor choice ==
It is important to understand that these advantages are more applicable to the decision between using a batch, a semibatch or a continuous reactor in a certain process. Both batch and semibatch reactors are more suitable for liquid phase reactions and small scale production, because they usually require lower capital costs than a continuously stirred tank reactor operation (CSTR), but incur greater costs per unit if production needs to be scaled up. These per unit costs include labor, materials handling (filling, emptying, cleaning), protective measures, and nonproductive periods that result from changeovers when switching batches. Hence, the capital costs must be weighed against operating costs to determine the correct reactor design to be implemented.

== Sources ==
- Hill, C. (1937). An Introduction to chemical engineering kinetics & reactor design. John Wiley & Sons, Inc.
- Grau, M.; Nougues, J.; Puigjaner, L. (2000). "Batch and semibatchreactor performance for an exothermic reaction". Chemical Engineering and Processing: Process Intensification. 39 (2): 141–148. Bibcode:2000CEPPI..39..141G. doi:10.1016/S0255-2701(99)00015-X.
- Heinzle, E. (n.d.). Semi-batch Reactor and Safety. Retrieved from http://www.uni-saarland.de/fak8/heinzle/de/teaching/Technische_Chemie_I/HE3_Semi-Batch%5B%5D Reactor_Text.pdf
- Wittrup, D. (2007). Reactor Size Comparisons For PFR and CSTR. Retrieved from http://ocw.mit.edu/courses/chemical-engineering/10-37-chemical-and-biological-reaction-engineering-spring-2007/lecture-notes/lec09_03072007_w.pdf
