= Elektrolytdatenbank Regensburg =

Compilation of thermodynamic data of electrolytes and their solutions

Elektrolytdatenbank Regensburg (abridged ELDAR) is a compilation of thermodynamic data, bibliography and properties of electrolytes and their solutions.

== History ==
The gathering of data has begun in 1981. It is a member of DECHEMA and associate of Dortmund Data Bank.

== Content ==
- Densities, dielectric constants
- Thermal expansion and compressibility data
- Electrical conductivity data
- Solubility data
- Activity and excess molar quantity data
