= Chemical reactor materials selection =

Chemical reactor materials selection is an important aspect in the design of a chemical reactor. There are four main groups of chemical reactors - CSTR, PFR, semi-batch, and catalytic - with variations on each. Depending on the nature of the chemicals involved in the reaction, as well as the operating conditions (e.g. temperature and pressure), certain materials will perform better over others.

== Material Options ==
Ashby diagram of strength versus maximum service temperature. Taken from CES EduPack Material and Process Selection Charts.

There are several broad classes of materials available for use in creating a chemical reactor. Some examples include metals, glasses, ceramics, polymers, carbon, and composites. Metals are the most common class of materials for chemical engineering equipment as they are comparatively easy to manufacture, have high strength, and are resistant to fracture. Glass is common in chemical laboratory equipment, but highly prone to fracture and so is not useful in large-scale industrial use. Ceramics are not that common of a material for chemical reactors as they are brittle and difficult to manufacture. Polymers have begun to gain more popularity in piping and valves as they aid in temperature stability. There are several forms of carbon, but the most useful form for reactors is carbon or graphite fibers in composites.

== Criteria for Selection ==
The last important criteria for a particular material is its safety. Engineers have a responsibility to ensure the safety of those who handle equipment or utilize a building or road for example, by minimizing the risks of injuries or casualties. Other considerations include strength, resistance to sudden failure from either mechanical or thermal shock, corrosion resistance, and cost, to name a few. To compare different materials to each other, it may prove useful to consult an ASHBY diagram and the ASME Pressure Vessel Codes. The material choice would be ideally drawn from known data as well as experience. Having a deeper understanding of the component requirements and the corrosion and degradation behavior will aid in materials selection. Additionally, knowing the performance of past systems, whether they be good or bad, will benefit the user in deciding on alternative alloys or using a coated system; if previous information is not available, then performing tests is recommended.

== High Temperature Operation ==
High temperature reactor operation includes a host of problems such as distortion and cracking due to thermal expansion and contraction, and high temperature corrosion. Some indications that the latter is occurring include burnt or charred surfaces, molten phases, distortion, thick scales, and grossly thinned metal. Some typical high-temperature alloys include iron, nickel, or cobalt that have >20% chromium for the purpose of forming a protective oxide against further oxidation. There are also various other elements to aid in corrosion resistance such as aluminum, silicon, and rare earth elements such as yttrium, cerium, and lanthanum. Other additions such as reactive or refractory metals, can improve the mechanical properties of the reactor. Refractory metals can experience catastrophic oxidation, which turns metals into a powdery oxide with little use. This damage is worse in stagnant conditions, however silicide coatings have been proven to offer some resistance.
