= Process miniaturization =

Chemical process

Chemical process miniaturization refers to a philosophical concept within the discipline of process design that challenges the notion of "economy of scale" or "bigger is better." In this context, process design refers to the discipline taught primarily to chemical engineers⁣⁣. However, the emerging discipline of process miniaturization will involve integrated knowledge from many areas; as examples, systems engineering and design, remote measurement and control using intelligent sensors, biological process systems engineering, and advanced manufacturing robotics, etc.

One of the challenges of chemical engineering has been to design processes based on chemical laboratory-scale methods, and to scale-up processes so that products can be manufactured that are economically affordable.

As a process becomes larger, more product can be produced per unit time, so when a process technology becomes established or mature and operates consistently without upsets or "downtime," more economic efficiency can be gained from scale-up. Given a fixed price for the feedstock (e.g., the price per barrel of crude oil), the product cost can be decreased using a larger-scale process because the capital investment and operational costs do not normally increase linearly with scale. For example, the capacity or volume of a cylindrical vessel used to produce a product increases proportional to the square of the radius of the cylinder, so the cost of materials per unit volume decreases. But the costs to design and fabricate the vessel have traditionally been less sensitive to scale. In other words, one can design a small vessel and fabricate it for about the same cost as the larger vessel. In addition, the cost to control and operate a process (or a process unit component) does not change substantially with the scale. For example, if it takes one operator to operate a small process, that same operator can probably operate the larger process.

The economy of scale concept, as taught to chemical engineers, has led to the notion that one of the objectives of process development and design is to achieve “economy of scale” by scaling up to the largest possible size processing plant so that the product cost can be economically affordable. This disciplinary philosophy has been reinforced by example designs in the petroleum refining and petrochemical industries, where feedstocks have been transported as fluids in pipelines, large tanker ships, and railcars.

Fluids, by definition, are materials that flow and can be transferred using pumps or gravity. Therefore, large pumps, valves, and pipelines exist to transfer large amounts of fluids in the process industries. Process miniaturization, in contrast, will involve processing large amounts of solids from renewable biomass resources; therefore, new thinking towards process designs optimized for solids processing will be required.

The concept of a microprocess was defined by S. S. Sofer, while he was a professor at the New Jersey Institute of Technology⁣⁣. A microprocess has the following characteristics:

1) ➞ Portability
2) ➞ Capable of being mass-produced using advanced robotic manufacturing methods
3) ➞ Approaching total automation
4) ➞ A new technology

== Miniaturization of Electronic Devices ==
The microprocess design philosophy has been largely envisioned by historical analysis of the role that component miniaturization has played in the information technology industry. It is the evolution of the miniaturization of computer hardware that has enabled the thinking about process miniaturization in the chemical engineering design context. Rather than the traditional design objective as “scale-up” of processing to one centralized large processing plant (e.g. the mainframe), one can envision achieving the economic objectives using a “scale-out” philosophy (e.g., multiple microcomputers).

Electrical and electronic devices have always played an important role in chemical process plant automation. However, initially, simple thermometers such as those containing mercury and pressure gauges, which were completely mechanical in nature, were used to monitor process conditions (such as the temperature, pressure, and level in a chemical reactor). Process conditions were adjusted based largely on a human operator's heuristic knowledge of the process behavior. Even with electronic automation installed, many process still require substantial operator interaction, particularly during the start-up phase of the process or during deployment of a new technology.

Process control of the future will involve the widespread utilization of intelligent sensors and mass-produced intelligent miniaturized devices such as programmable logic controllers that communicate wirelessly to process actuators. Since these devices will be miniaturized to reduce manufacturing cost, this enables the devices to be embedded in structures so that they become invisible to the casual observer. The cost of such sensors will likely be reduced to a point where they either "function or don't function." When that cost threshold has been reached, the repair procedure will be to disable the sensor and to actuate a redundant working sensor. In other words, entire complex control systems will become so low cost that repair will not be economically viable.

The intelligence of the process will be developed using process simulation models based on scientific fundamentals. Heuristic rules will be programmed into the micro-controllers, which will largely eliminate the need for constant monitoring by human heuristic knowledge of the process behavior. A process that can automatically self-optimize through advanced algorithms developed by microprocess engineers will be embedded and only accessible to the knowledge owner. This will enable the construction of large networks of autonomous microprocesses.

== Process Miniaturization for Knowledge-based Businesses ==
Advanced process control systems for process miniaturization will increase the need for controlling the security and ownership of process intelligence in a knowledge-based business. It will become more difficult to control intellectual property through the traditional method of patents; therefore, trademarks, brand recognition, and copyright laws will play a more important role in value security for knowledge-based businesses of the future.

Techno-economic analysis, as taught in traditional chemical process design, will also dramatically shift from a conservative viewpoint of utilization of historical trend economics and cash flow analysis. Economic viability of a given enterprise will be more linked to acquisition of real-time economic information that can rapidly change based on empirical observations created by an emerging discipline of microprocess development systems; therefore, the models will be more based on "what can be?" rather that "what has the past shown?"

== Process Miniaturization for Future Societies Based on Renewable Materials ==
Rather than one large central plant that has to be fed a large amount of feedstock, such as a refinery that can unload a tanker shipment of petroleum if located next to an ocean, the discipline of process miniaturization envisions the distribution of the process technology to areas where the feedstock is not readily transportable in large quantities to a large centralized processing plant. The miniaturized process technology may simply involve transformation of solid biomass materials from multiple distributed microprocesses into more easily manageable fluids. The fluids can then be transported or distributed to larger-scale intelligent processing nodes using conventional fluid transport technology.

Historically, small processes or microprocesses per se have always existed. For example, small vineyards and breweries have produced feedstock, processed it, and stored product in what could be considered “microprocess” when compared to processes designed based on the petrochemical industry model or, for example, large-scale production of beer. Small villages in India and other places in the world have learned to produce biogas from animal manure in what could be considered small-scale microprocesses for the production of energy. However, microprocesses and process miniaturization as a design philosophy include the notion of approaching total automation and are new technologies that have been enabled by computer hardware miniaturization, for example, the microprocessor. It is easy to envision processes that can be mass-produced and transported. For example, many appliances such as air conditioners, domestic washing machines, and refrigerators could be considered microprocesses.

The design philosophy of process miniaturization envisions that “scale-down” of complex processes involving multiple process unit operations can be achieved and that economy of scale will be more related to the size of a network of distributed autonomous microprocesses. Since failure of one autonomous microprocess does not cause shutdown of the entire network, microprocesses will lead to more economically efficient, robust, and stable production of products that have traditionally been produced for a petroleum-based society.

Since fossil fuels by definition are being consumed and are non-renewable, future fuel and materials will be based on renewable biomass.

== Process Miniaturization for Microbial Fuel Cells ==
The conversion of biomass into energy is more challenging to the technologist than energy from fossil fuels. Water, dissolved organic and inorganic compounds, and solid particulates of various sizes can be present in biomass processes. Distribution of knowledge, through miniaturized devices, can be accelerated by low-power-consuming devices (such as smartphones). A rethinking of "What is a power plant?" can likely create innovations, given advances in membrane materials of construction, immobilized whole cell methodologies, metabolic engineering, and nanotechnology.

The challenges of microbial fuel cells relate mainly to finding lower cost manufacturing methods, materials of construction, and systems design. Bruce Logan from the Penn State University has described in several research articles and reviews these challenges.

However, even with existing designs which generate low power, there are applications in distribution of electrical recharging systems to remote areas of Africa, where smart phone, can enable access to the vast information of the internet, and to provide lighting. These systems can run on agricultural, animal and human waste streams using naturally occurring bacteria.

== Process Miniaturization for mini Nuclear Reactors ==
Nuclear power is considered "green technology" in that it does not produce carbon dioxide, a green house gas, as do traditional natural gas or coal-fired power plants. The economics of the deployment of mini nuclear reactors has been discussed in an article in "The Economist".

The advantages of mini nuclear reactors has also been discussed by Secretary of Energy, Steven Chu. As discussed by Chu, the reactors would be manufactured in a factory-like situation and then transported, intact by rail or ship to different parts of the country or world. Economy of scale by size is replaced by economy of scale by number. Many companies are not willing to accept the risk of investing $8B to $9B dollars in single large reactor, so one of the most attractive features of process miniaturization is a reduction in the risk of capital investment, and the possibility of recovering investment by reselling and relocating a functional turn-key microprocess to a new owner - a major economic advantage of the portability of microprocesses.
