= Aspen HYSYS =

Chemical process simulator by AspenTech

HYSYS
- Developers: Hyprotech, Aspen Technology
- Initial release: 1996; 29 years ago
- Stable release: aspenONE V12.2 / November 1, 2021; 4 years ago
- Operating system: Windows
- Type: chemical process simulator
- License: Proprietary software
- Website: www.aspentech.com/en/products/engineering/aspen-hysys

Aspen HYSYS (or simply HYSYS) is a chemical process simulator currently developed by AspenTech used to mathematically model chemical processes, from unit operations to full chemical plants and refineries. HYSYS is able to perform many of the core calculations of chemical engineering, including those concerned with mass balance, energy balance, vapor-liquid equilibrium, heat transfer, mass transfer, chemical kinetics, fractionation, and pressure drop. HYSYS is used extensively in industry and academia for steady-state and dynamic simulation, process design, performance modeling, and optimization.

== Etymology ==
HYSYS is a portmanteau formed from Hyprotech, the name of the company which created the software, and Systems.

== History ==
HYSYS was first conceived and created by the Canadian company Hyprotech, founded by researchers from the University of Calgary. The HYSYS Version 1.1 Reference Volume was published in 1996. In May 2002, AspenTech acquired Hyprotech, including HYSYS for approximately $99 million.

Following a 2004 ruling by the United States Federal Trade Commission, AspenTech was forced to divest its Hyprotech assets, including HYSYS source code, ultimately selling these to Honeywell. Honeywell was also able to hire a number of HYSYS developers, ultimately mobilizing these resources to produce UniSim. The divestment agreement specified that Aspentech would retain rights to market and develop most Hyprotech products (including HYSYS) royalty-free. As of 2024, AspenTech continues to produce HYSYS.
