= Intelligen =

American company

Intelligen, Inc. is a provider of process simulation and production scheduling tools and services for the process industries. It is headquartered in Scotch Plains, New Jersey, US, has offices in Europe and representatives in several countries around the globe.

== History ==
Founded in 1991, Intelligen was born out of research work carried out at the Biotechnology Process Engineering Center of the Massachusetts Institute of Technology (MIT). Its process simulation and production scheduling tools focus on the needs of the following industries: Biotechnology, Pharmaceuticals, Fine chemicals, Biofuels, Food & Consumer Products, Mineral Processing, Wastewater Treatment, Water Purification, and Air Pollution Control. It has pioneered technologies and tools for modeling and optimization of Batch production processes. The company's principals have contributed to an established textbook on Bioseparations Science and Engineering. SuperPro Designer, the company's comprehensive process simulator, has been used to analyze and evaluate 11 bioprocesses featured in a book on Development of Sustainable Bioprocesses.
