= HSC Sim =

Process simulator

HSC Sim is a process simulator based on the HSC Chemistry software and databases. It has been implemented as a module to HSC Chemistry 6.0 published in June 2006 and can be used primarily for static process simulation. HSC stands for H ([enthalpy]), S ([entropy]) and Cp([heat capacity]).

== Applications ==
HSC Sim has been primarily developed for the use in the mining and mineral industry, though other use such as modelling of biochemical and organic chemistry processes is possible as well. In mineral industry the simulator is used for process operator training as an OTS (operator training simulator).
