= OLGA (technology) =

OLGA is a modelling tool for transportation of oil, natural gas and water in the same pipeline, so-called multiphase transportation. The name is short for "oil and gas simulator". The main challenge with multiphase fluid flow is the formation of slugs (plugs of oil and water) in the pipelines, which causes large problems at the receiving end at the platform or the onshore plant. The modelling tool makes it possible to calculate the fluid flow and safely bring the flow to the receiving destination on shore, on a platform or a production ship through the pipes.

== History ==
The idea for the tool was conceived in 1979 by two researchers at IFE, Norway: Dag Malnes and Kjell Bendiksen. The first version of OLGA was financed by Statoil and was ready in 1980. The tool was developed further by IFE in collaboration with SINTEF in the 1980s.

January 1, 1984 a joint industry agreement was signed by Statoil, IFE and SINTEF on the continued development of OLGA. IFE had the main responsibility for developing the model, while the technical experiments were performed in SINTEF’s laboratory at Tiller.

Until 2012 the SPT Group owned the rights to OLGA. In March 2012, Schlumberger announced an agreement with Altor Fund II for the acquisition of SPT Group. The acquisition was completed in Q2. SPT Group, founded in 1971, was headquartered in Norway employing approximately 280 people in 11 countries at the time of the acquisition. The tool has been under continuous and still ongoing development, among others in the HORIZON II project where IFE and SPT Group are partners. OLGA has a global market share of about 90%. The technology is regarded as a central success for Norwegian petroleum research.

OLGA has enabled the development of oil and gas fields at deeper seas and farther from shore than would otherwise be possible without this technology, for example the fields Troll, Ormen Lange and Snøhvit.
