= Société Française de Génie des Procédés =

Engineering organization of France

- Abbreviation: SFGP
- Formation: 1997
- Legal status: professional organization
- Purpose: Chemical engineering,
- Location: Paris, 28 rue Saint-Dominique (75007)
- Region served: France
- Members: 668
- Président: Frédéric Augier
- Main organ: Procédique
- Affiliations: EFCE
- Website: http://www.sfgp.asso.fr/

The Société Française de Génie des Procédés (SFGP; French Society of Process Engineers) is a French organization for chemical engineers. It is a member of the European Federation of Chemical Engineering and acts as joint Secretariat, and of la Fédération Française pour les sciences de la Chimie (FFC). It publishes a technical journal "Récents progrès en Génie des Procédés", and news for members "Procédique" (first published April 1988), and organizes a congress every alternate year. As of 2014 its membership is in excess of 600.

Its history dates back to a congress in 1987, 1er Congrès Français de Génie des Procédés, and the formation the following year of a Groupe Français de Génie des Procédés (GFGP), which in 1989 had 340 members. and formally transformed into the present organization in 1997.

Its mission statement is to:

- promote Process Engineering.
- promote exchanges between academics, trainers and researchers, manufacturers developing and operating processes, engineering companies and suppliers at the national, European and global levels.
- build a network of experts to respond to societal challenges and the innovation needs of Process Industries.
- be a force for representations to political and institutional decision-makers.
