= Education for Chemical Engineers =

- Discipline: Education, chemical engineering
- Language: English
- Edited by: J. Glassey

Publication details
- History: 2006-present
- Publisher: Elsevier, on behalf of Institution of Chemical Engineers
- Frequency: Quarterly
- Impact factor: 2.333 (2020)

Standard abbreviations
- ISO 4: Educ. Chem. Eng.

Indexing
- ISSN: 1749-7728
- OCLC no.: 70543844

Links
- Journal homepage; Online access; Journal page at Institution of Chemical Engineers website

Education for Chemical Engineers is a peer-reviewed academic journal published quarterly by Elsevier on behalf of the Institution of Chemical Engineers. The journal's scope covers all aspects of chemical engineering education. The journal was established in 2006 and publishes educational research papers, teaching and learning notes, and resource reviews. It is an official Journal of the European Federation of Chemical Engineering.

== Abstracting and indexing ==
The journal is abstracted and indexed in EBSCOHost, Gale Database of Publications & Broadcast Media, and Scopus.
