= Chemical engineering =

Engineering discipline focused on the design and operation of chemical plants

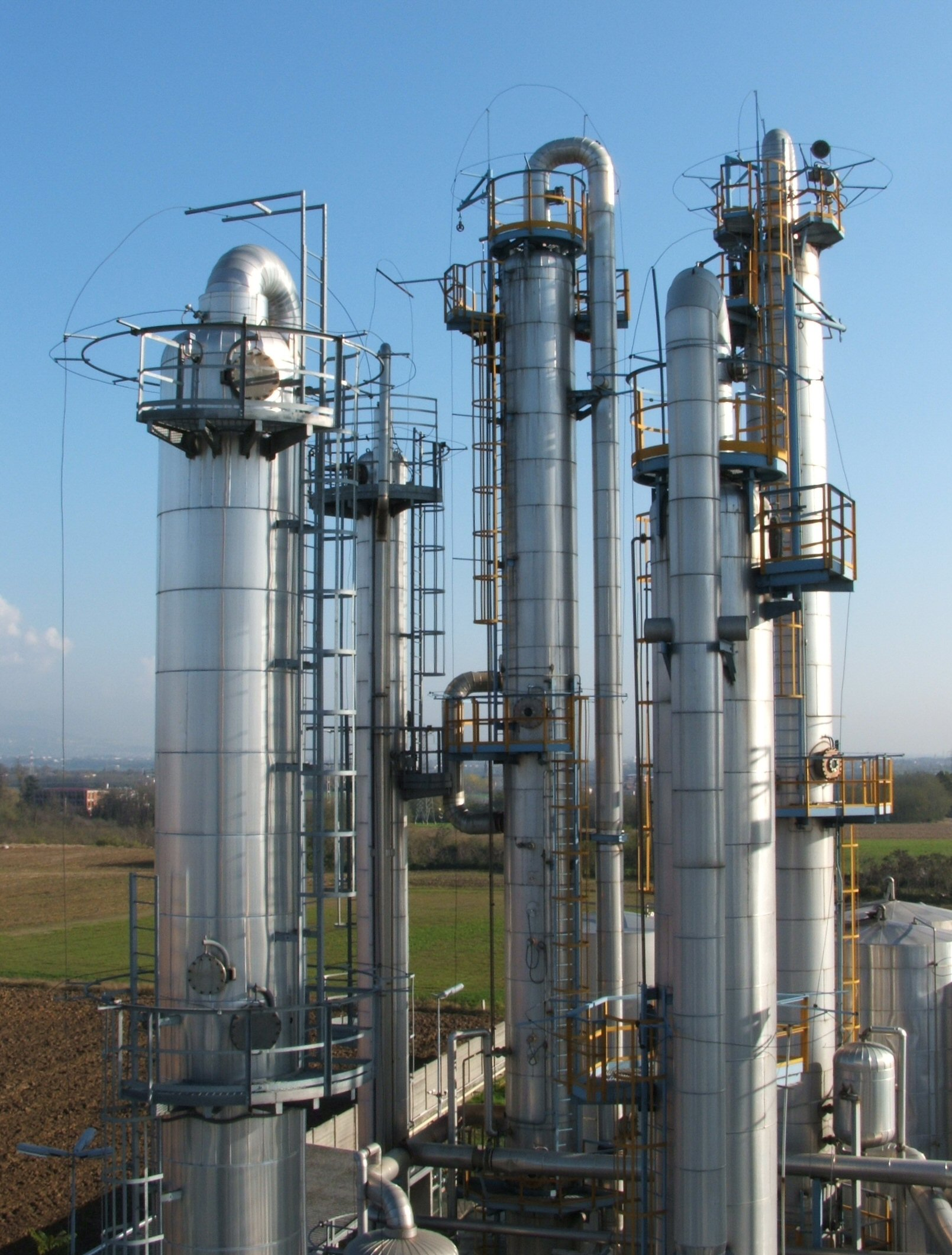
Chemical engineers design, construct, and operate process plants, such as these fractionating columns.

Chemical engineering is an engineering field which deals with the study of the operation and design of chemical plants as well as methods of improving production. Chemical engineers develop economical commercial processes to convert raw materials into useful products. Chemical engineering uses principles of chemistry, physics, mathematics, biology, and economics to efficiently use, produce, design, transport and transform energy and materials. The work of chemical engineers can range from the utilization of nanotechnology and nanomaterials in the laboratory to large-scale industrial processes that convert chemicals, raw materials, living cells, microorganisms, and energy into useful forms and products. Chemical engineers are involved in many aspects of plant design and operation, including safety and hazard assessments, process design and analysis, modeling, control engineering, chemical reaction engineering, nuclear engineering, biological engineering, construction specification, and operating instructions.

Chemical engineers typically hold a degree in Chemical Engineering or Process Engineering. Practicing engineers may have professional certification and be accredited members of a professional body. Such bodies include the Institution of Chemical Engineers (IChemE) or the American Institute of Chemical Engineers (AIChE) and respective states in the U.S., which ultimately confer licensure and title of Professional Engineer. A degree in chemical engineering is directly linked with all of the other engineering disciplines, to various extents.

== Etymology ==
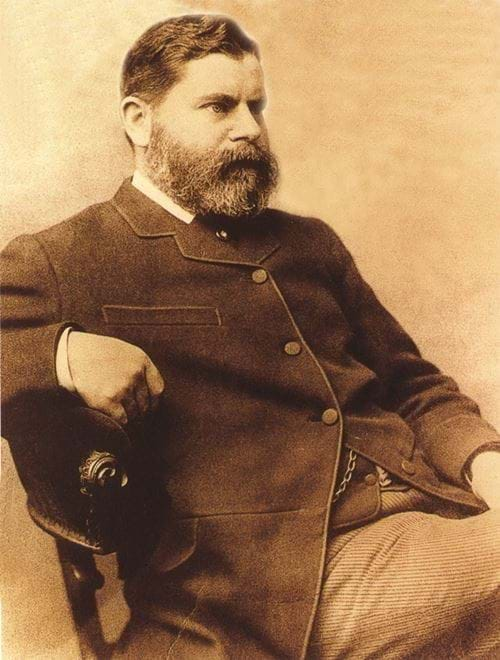
George E. Davis (1850–1907) is regarded as the founding father of the discipline of chemical engineering.

A 1996 article cites James F. Donnelly for mentioning an 1839 reference to chemical engineering in relation to the production of sulfuric acid. In the same paper, however, George E. Davis, an English consultant, was credited with having coined the term. Davis also tried to found a Society of Chemical Engineering, but instead, it was named the Society of Chemical Industry (1881), with Davis as its first secretary. The History of Science in the United States: An Encyclopedia puts the use of the term around 1890. "Chemical engineering", describing the use of mechanical equipment in the chemical industry, became common vocabulary in England after 1850. By 1910, the profession, "chemical engineer", was already in common use in Britain and the United States.

== History ==
=== New concepts and innovations ===
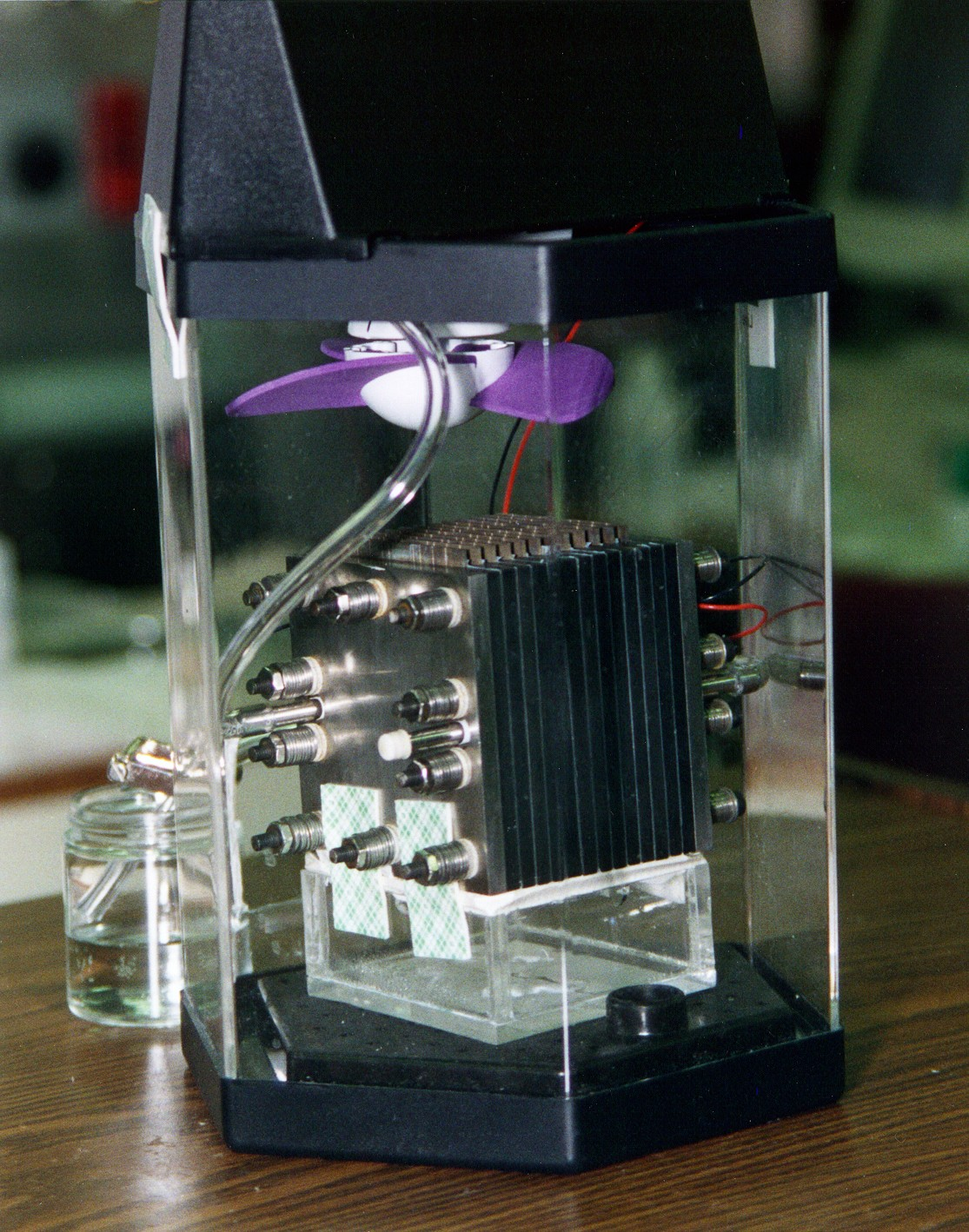
Demonstration model of a direct-methanol fuel cell. The actual fuel cell stack is the layered cube shape in the center of the image.

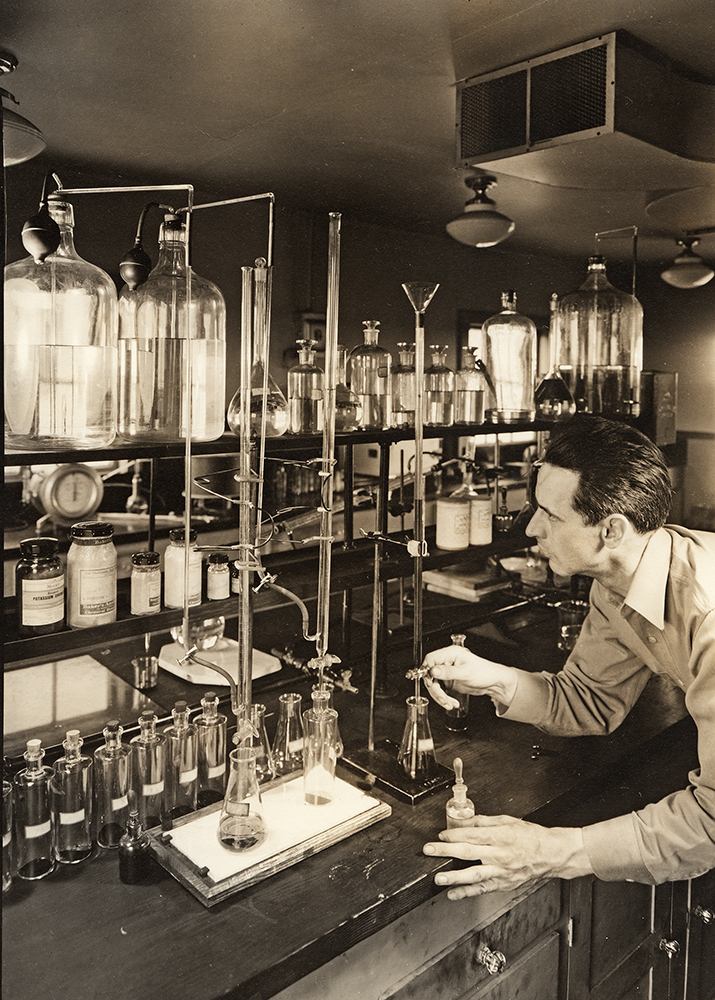
Technician with equipment at the Continental Carbon Company.

In the 1940s, it became clear that unit operations alone were insufficient in developing chemical reactors. While the predominance of unit operations in chemical engineering courses in Britain and the United States continued until the 1960s, transport phenomena started to receive greater focus. Along with other novel concepts, such as process systems engineering (PSE), a "second paradigm" was defined. Transport phenomena gave an analytical approach to chemical engineering while PSE focused on its synthetic elements, such as those of a control system and process design. Developments in chemical engineering before and after World War II were mainly incited by the petrochemical industry; however, advances in other fields were made as well. Advancements in biochemical engineering in the 1940s, for example, found application in the pharmaceutical industry, and allowed for the mass production of various antibiotics, including penicillin and streptomycin. Meanwhile, progress in polymer science in the 1950s paved way for the "age of plastics".

=== Safety and hazard developments ===
Concerns regarding large-scale chemical manufacturing facilities' safety and environmental impact were also raised during this period. Silent Spring, published in 1962, alerted its readers to the harmful effects of DDT, a potent insecticide. The 1974 Flixborough disaster in the United Kingdom resulted in 28 deaths, as well as damage to a chemical plant and three nearby villages. 1984 Bhopal disaster in India resulted in at least 4,000 deaths. These incidents, along with other incidents, affected the reputation of the trade as industrial safety and environmental protection were given more focus. In response, the IChemE required safety to be part of every degree course that it accredited after 1982. By the 1970s, legislation and monitoring agencies were instituted in various countries, such as France, Germany, and the United States. In time, the systematic application of safety principles to chemical and other process plants began to be considered a specific discipline, known as process safety.

=== Recent progress ===
Advancements in computer science found applications for designing and managing plants, simplifying calculations and drawings that previously had to be done manually. Programs such as Aspen HYSYS were developed to complete multiple chemical engineering calculations. The completion of the Human Genome Project is also seen as a major development, not only advancing chemical engineering but genetic engineering and genomics as well. Chemical engineering principles were used to produce DNA sequences in large quantities.

== Concepts ==
=== Plant design and construction ===
Chemical engineering design concerns the creation of plans, specifications, and economic analyses for pilot plants, new plants, or plant modifications. Design engineers often work in a consulting role, designing plants to meet clients' needs. Design is limited by several factors, including funding, government regulations, and safety standards. These constraints dictate a plant's choice of process, materials, and equipment.

Plant construction is coordinated by project engineers and project managers, depending on the size of the investment. A chemical engineer may do the job of project engineer full-time or part of the time, which requires additional training and job skills or act as a consultant to the project group. In the USA the education of chemical engineering graduates from the Baccalaureate programs accredited by ABET do not usually stress project engineering education, which can be obtained by specialized training, as electives, or from graduate programs. Project engineering jobs are some of the largest employers for chemical engineers.

=== Process design and analysis ===
A unit operation is a physical step in an individual chemical engineering process. Unit operations (such as crystallization, filtration, drying and evaporation) are used to prepare reactants, purifying and separating its products, recycling unspent reactants, and controlling energy transfer in reactors. On the other hand, a unit process is the chemical equivalent of a unit operation. Along with unit operations, unit processes constitute a process operation. Unit processes (such as nitration, hydrogenation, and oxidation) involve the conversion of materials by biochemical, thermochemical and other means. Chemical engineers responsible for these are called process engineers.

Process design requires the definition of equipment types and sizes as well as how they are connected and the materials of construction. Details are often printed on a Process Flow Diagram which is used to control the capacity and reliability of a new or existing chemical factory.

Education for chemical engineers in the first college degree 3 or 4 years of study stresses the principles and practices of process design. The same skills are used in existing chemical plants to evaluate the efficiency and make recommendations for improvements.

=== Transport phenomena ===
Modeling and analysis of transport phenomena is essential for many industrial applications. Transport phenomena involve fluid dynamics, heat transfer and mass transfer, which are governed mainly by momentum transfer, energy transfer and transport of chemical species, respectively. Models often involve separate considerations for macroscopic, microscopic and molecular level phenomena. Modeling of transport phenomena, therefore, requires an understanding of applied mathematics.

== Applications and practice ==
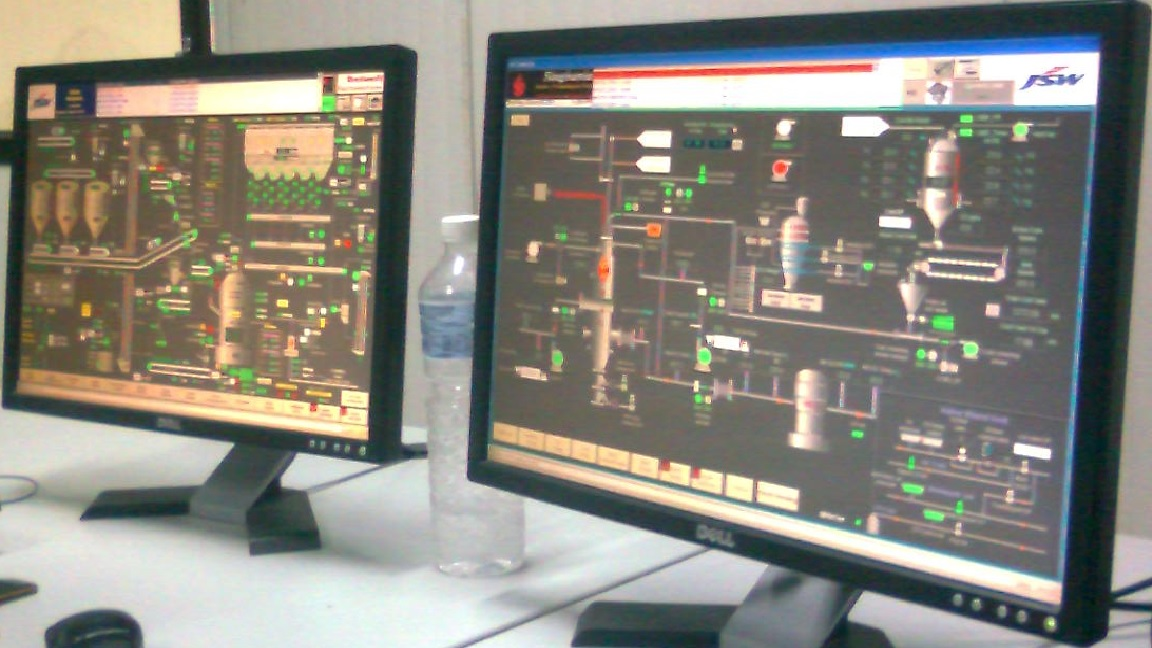
Chemical engineers use computers to control automated systems in plants

Chemical engineers develop economic ways of using materials and energy. Chemical engineers use chemistry and engineering to turn raw materials into usable products, such as medicine, petrochemicals, and plastics on a large-scale, industrial setting. They are also involved in waste management and research. Both applied and research facets could make extensive use of computers.

Chemical engineers may be involved in industry or university research where they are tasked with designing and performing experiments, by scaling up theoretical chemical reactions, to create better and safer methods for production, pollution control, and resource conservation. They may be involved in designing and constructing plants as a project engineer. Chemical engineers serving as project engineers use their knowledge in selecting optimal production methods and plant equipment to minimize costs and maximize safety and profitability. After plant construction, chemical engineering project managers may be involved in equipment upgrades, troubleshooting, and daily operations in either full-time or consulting roles.

== Occupational outlook ==
According to the U.S. Bureau of Labor Statistics, the occupational outlook for chemical engineers between 2024 and 2034 was 3% growth.

== See also ==
=== Related topics ===
- Education for Chemical Engineers
- English Engineering units
- List of chemical engineering societies
- List of chemical engineers
- List of chemical process simulators
- Outline of chemical engineering

=== Related fields ===
- Biochemical engineering
- Bioinformatics
- Biological engineering
- Biomedical engineering
- Biomolecular engineering
- Bioprocess engineering
- Biotechnology
- Biotechnology engineering
- Chemical technologist
- Chemical weapons
- Cheminformatics
- Computational fluid dynamics
- Corrosion engineering
- Cost estimation
- Earthquake engineering
- Electrochemistry
- Electrochemical engineering
- Environmental engineering
- Food engineering
- Industrial catalysts
- Industrial chemistry
- Industrial gas
- Mass transfer
- Materials science
- Metallurgy
- Molecular engineering
- Nanotechnology
- Paper engineering
- Petroleum engineering
- Pharmaceutical engineering
- Plastics engineering
- Process design
- Process development
- Process engineering
- Textile engineering
- Thermodynamics

=== Related concepts ===
- Fischer Tropsch synthesis
- Fluid dynamics
- Fuel cell
- Gasification
- Heat transfer
- Natural environment
- Natural gas processing
- Catalysts
- Ceramics
- Chemical process modeling
- Chemical reactor
- Nuclear reprocessing
- Oil exploration
- Oil refinery
- Polymers
- Process control
- Process miniaturization
- Process safety
- Semiconductor device fabrication
- Separation processes (see also: separation of mixture)
  - Crystallization processes
  - Distillation processes
  - Membrane processes
- Syngas production
- Transport phenomena
- Unit operations
- Water technology
- Microfluidics
- Mineral processing

=== Associations ===
- American Institute of Chemical Engineers
- Chemical Institute of Canada
- European Federation of Chemical Engineering
- Indian Institute of Chemical Engineers
- Institution of Chemical Engineers
- National Organization for the Professional Advancement of Black Chemists and Chemical Engineers

== Bibliography ==
- American Institute of Chemical Engineers (2003-01-17), AIChE Constitution, archived from the original on 2011-08-13.
- Bird, R. Byron; Stewart, Warren E.; Lightfoot, Edwin N. (2002), Kulek, Petrina (ed.), Transport Phenomena (2nd ed.), United States: John Wiley & Sons, ISBN 0-471-41077-2, LCCN 2001023739, LCC QA929.B% 2001.
- Carberry, James J. (2001-07-24), Chemical and Catalytic Reaction Engineering, McGraw-Hill Chemical Engineering Series, Canada: General Publishing Company, ISBN 0-486-41736-0, LCCN 2001017315, LCC TP155.7.C37 2001.
- Cohen, Clive (June 1996), "The Early History of Chemical Engineering: A Reassessment" (PDF), Br. J. Hist. Sci., 29 (2), Cambridge University Press: 171–194, doi:10.1017/S000708740003421X, JSTOR 4027832, S2CID 145005140, archived from the original (PDF) on 2012-06-01.
- Engineering the Future of Biology and Biotechnology, Rice University, archived from the original on 2010-07-25.
- Garner, Geraldine O. (2003), Careers in engineering, VGM Professional Career Series (2nd ed.), United States: McGraw-Hill, ISBN 0-07-139041-3, LCCN 2002027208, LCC TA157.G3267 2002.
- Kim, Irene (January 2002), "Chemical engineering: A rich and diverse history" (PDF), Chemical Engineering Progress, 98 (1), Philadelphia: American Institute of Chemical Engineers, ISSN 0360-7275, archived from the original (PDF) on 2004-08-21.
- McCabe, Warren L.; Smith, Julian C.; Hariott, Peter (1993), Clark, B.J.; Castellano, Eleanor (eds.), Unit Operations of Chemical Engineering, McGraw-Hill Chemical Engineering Series (5th ed.), Singapore: McGraw-Hill, ISBN 0-07-044844-2, LCCN 92036218, LCC TP155.7.M393 1993.
- Ogawa, Kōhei (2007), "Chapter 1: Information Entropy", Chemical engineering: a new perspective (1st ed.), Netherlands: Elsevier, ISBN 978-0-444-53096-7.
- Perkins, J.D. (2003), "Chapter 2: Chemical Engineering — the First 100 Years", in Darton, R.C.; Prince, R.G.H.; Wood, D.G. (eds.), Chemical Engineering: Visions of the World (1st ed.), Netherlands: Elsevier Science, ISBN 0-444-51309-4.
- Reynolds, Terry S. (2001), "Engineering, Chemical", in Rothenberg, Marc (ed.), History of Science in the United States: An Encyclopedia, New York City: Garland Publishing, ISBN 0-8153-0762-4, LCCN 99043757, LCC Q127.U6 H57 2000.
- Silla, Harry (2003), Chemical Process Engineering: Design and Economics, New York City: Marcel Dekker, ISBN 0-8247-4274-5.
- American Institute of Chemical Engineers (2003a), "Speeding up the human genome project" (PDF), Chemical Engineering Progress, 99 (1), Philadelphia, ISSN 0360-7275, archived from the original (PDF) on 2004-08-21.
- Towler, Gavin; Sinnott, Ray (2008), Chemical engineering design: principles, practice and economics of plant and process design, United States: Elsevier, ISBN 978-0-7506-8423-1.
