= George E. Davis =

English chemical engineer

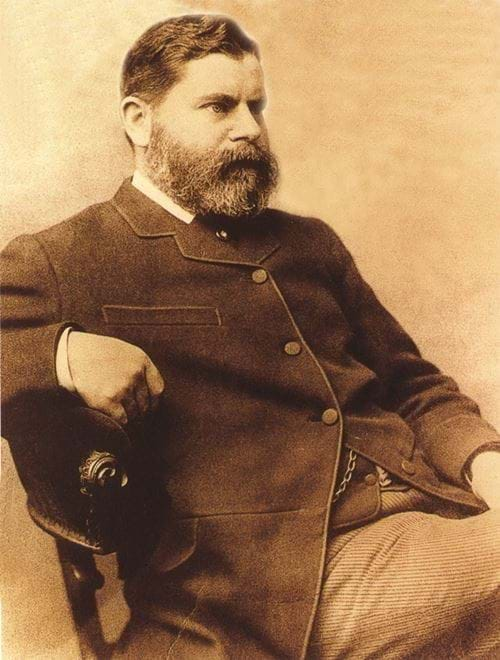
- Born: 27 July 1850; Eton, Buckinghamshire, England, UK
- Died: 20 April 1907 (aged 56)
- Education: Royal School of Mines
- Known for: Founding father of chemical engineering
- Scientific career
- Fields: Chemistry

George Edward Davis (1850–1907) was a chemist who is regarded as the founding father of the discipline of chemical engineering. He was also involved in microscopy.

== Life ==
Davis was born at Eton on 27 July 1850, the eldest son of George Davis, a bookseller. At the age of fourteen he was apprenticed to a local bookbinder but he abandoned this trade after two years to pursue his interest in chemistry. Davis studied at the Slough Mechanics Institute while working at the local gas works, and then spent a year studying at the Royal School of Mines in London (now part of Imperial College, London) before leaving to work in the chemical industry around Manchester, which at the time was the main centre of the chemical industry in the UK.

Davis worked as a chemist at Brearley and Sons for three years. He also worked as an inspector for the Alkali Act 1863 (26 & 27 Vict. c. 124), a very early piece of environmental legislation that required soda manufacturers to reduce the amount of gaseous hydrochloric acid released to the atmosphere from their factories. In 1872 he was engaged as manager at the Lichfield Chemical Company in Staffordshire. In this job his capacity for innovation flourished. His works included what was at the time the tallest chimney in the UK, with a height of more than 200 feet (61 m).

He married Laura Frances Miller on 10 December 1878, and they had at least two sons, Eric (1881- ) and Kerville (1881 - 1934). He worked as a consultant to the chemical industry jointly with his brother Alfred, founded the Chemical Trade Journal and had 67 patents granted, as well as publishing scientific papers.

Davis was also instrumental in the formation of the Society of Chemical Industry (1881), which he had wanted to name the Society of Chemical Engineering, and was its first Secretary. He was also interested in microscopy, founding the journal Northern Microscopist in 1881, and publishing a textbook on the subject, Practical Microscopy (1882).

He died in West Dulwich, on 20 April 1907.

== Contribution to chemical engineering ==
Davis identified broad features in common to all chemical factories and wrote the influential A Handbook of Chemical Engineering. He also published a famous lecture series of 12 lectures, given in 1888 at Manchester Technical School (which became University of Manchester Institute of Science and Technology (UMIST)). These lectures defined chemical engineering as a discipline.

His lectures were criticized for being common place know-how since it was designed around operating practices used by British chemical industries. At this time, however, in the United States, this information helped initiate new thinking in the chemical industry, as well as spark chemical engineering degree programmes at several universities in the US.

== Recognition ==
In the 1st floor foyer of Jackson's Mill, the building that houses the School of Chemical Engineering and Analytical Science, University of Manchester, there is a display and memorial to Davis. The George E. Davis Medal of the Institution of Chemical Engineers is named in his honour.

== Publications ==
- Davis, George E. (1904). A Handbook Of Chemical Engineering (2nd ed.). Manchester: Davis Bros. Volumes I and II
- Davis, George E. (1907). Practical Microscopy. London: D. Bogue.
