= Corys TESS =

Corys is a manufacturer of training and engineering simulators for the rail transport, energy and hydrocarbon industries. The company is based in Grenoble, France, and was founded in 1997. Corys is the acronym for COmpagnie de Réalisation Industrielle de Simulateurs - Company of industrial simulators production.

The firm's capital is held by Framatome, EDF French Electricity Provider and IFP Training. It has subsidiaries in the United States (Corys Inc.), in India (Corys India Simulation Systems Pvt Ltd) and Cyprus (CORYS Simulation Middle East ).

British Rail Class 395 and British Rail Class 185 train simulators are supplied by Corys TESS.

== History ==
Corys was created in 1997 following the acquisition of the assets of Tractebel Engineering and Technicatome. The company is currently collaborating with Tractebel and Siemens on a project of eight driving simulators for the operators training of the Russian-designed VVER 440MW nuclear power plants in several Eastern European countries.

In 1998, Corys opened a subsidiary Corys Inc. in Chicago to develop the US market, including a simulator for Amtrak's high speed Acela trains. In 1999, while it still remained primarily focused in the energy field, the company won several railway industry contracts in the United States and Australia.

In 2007, it created a Beijing subsidiary called BKRT (for Beijing Keruitai; ke = science, rui = beautiful/timely, tai = peaceful/the name of a mountain) to develop a verification and validation simulator for the Ling Ao II power plant in Shenzhen.

In 2008, Ralf Gathmann became the new Managing Director of the firm. In the same year, the firm bought our and merged Thunder Simulation Inc. (based in Saint Marys, Georgia United States) with Corys Inc. in Chicago to form Corys Thunder Incorporation.

In 2009, Tractebel Engineering withdrew from the firm, with Areva and EDF becoming the shareholders of Corys, holding 66% and 34% of the capital of the Grenoble-based company. Following this change of shareholders, the firm changed its status and became a simplified joint-stock company (SAS).

CORYS Grenoble moved in 2011 to new premises, in the scientific zone of Grenoble “Polygone Scientifique” close to the CEA, CNRS, Synchrotron (ESRF) and many others. The 5 850m2 building, called the Mistral, respects the label “low energy consumption”.

On 10 July 2017, Corys became 100% owner of RSI. On 1 October, RSI S.A. merged with Corys S.A.S. and moved to the Corys premises in Grenoble. Since then, Corys has three shareholders: Framatome (50%), EDF (25%) and IFP Training (25%). Following this merger, Corys has three subsidiaries Corys Inc. in the United States, CORYS India Simulation Systems Pvt Lts in India and HKD in China, as well as a joint venture CORYS Simulation Middle East in Cyprus.

On 1 July 2020, Charles Rosmorduc becomes the new Chairman and CEO of CORYS.

== Products ==
The company has three business lines: energy, transportation and the process industries.

=== Energy ===
Corys provides training and engineering simulators for nuclear power plants, power plants, power grids, etc. It designs, renovates and maintains simulators, and provides training programs. The company is also involved in engineering activities for nuclear construction projects, in the design, testing and commissioning phases.

It also develops simulators for construction plants such as the Flamanville in France or the Taishan in China (China National Nuclear Corporation)., or the Hinkley Point in United Kingdom.

By 2016, Corys had already delivered more than 180 power plant simulators and maintained more than 100 full-scale nuclear power plant simulators in the United States and France in operational conditions.

=== Transport ===
Corys manufactures rail driving simulators for cargo trains, TGV (a French high-speed electric passenger train), highways, trams, and subway trains.

They produce simulators that represent the various rolling stock with computer-generated images designed with the Matrix 3D engine.

=== Process Industries ===
Since the merger of RSI Corys, the company has also become a solution provider dynamic simulation to the industry of oil and gas. This includes the steps from process design to plant operation. The simulators are used for engineering studies, operator training and operations support for the upstream, refining, midstream natural gas processing, Biogas, LNG and petrochemical industries.

In May 2021, CORYS extends its field of activity to the whole process industries with Water, Hydrogen and renewables.

== Structure ==
The activity of Corys is organized between the parent company and its subsidiaries. Corys Inc. handles North American customers for transportation, energy and hydrocarbons, while Corys Simulation Middle East is dedicated to the hydrocarbon industry.
