= Design II for Windows =

Process Simulator, hydrocarbon process

DESIGN II for Windows is a rigorous process simulator for chemical and hydrocarbon processes including refining, refrigeration, petrochemical, gas processing, gas treating, pipelines, fuel cells, ammonia, methanol and hydrogen facilities.

== History ==
In 1969 the DESIGN program was first offered on the University Computing Company (UCC) time sharing services. The DISTILL column program was merged into DESIGN to create DESIGN 2000 in 1975, and in 1984 – REFINE column and crude feeds program were merged into DESIGN 2000 to create DESIGN II. In 1991 the Windows user interface was added to DESIGN II and DESIGN II for Windows was born.

WinSim Inc. has developed and marketed DESIGN II for Windows, a steady-state process simulator, since 1995 when the company purchased the rights to the program from ChemShare Corporation.

Website: http://www.winsim.com/
