= DECHEMA =

German non-profit organization

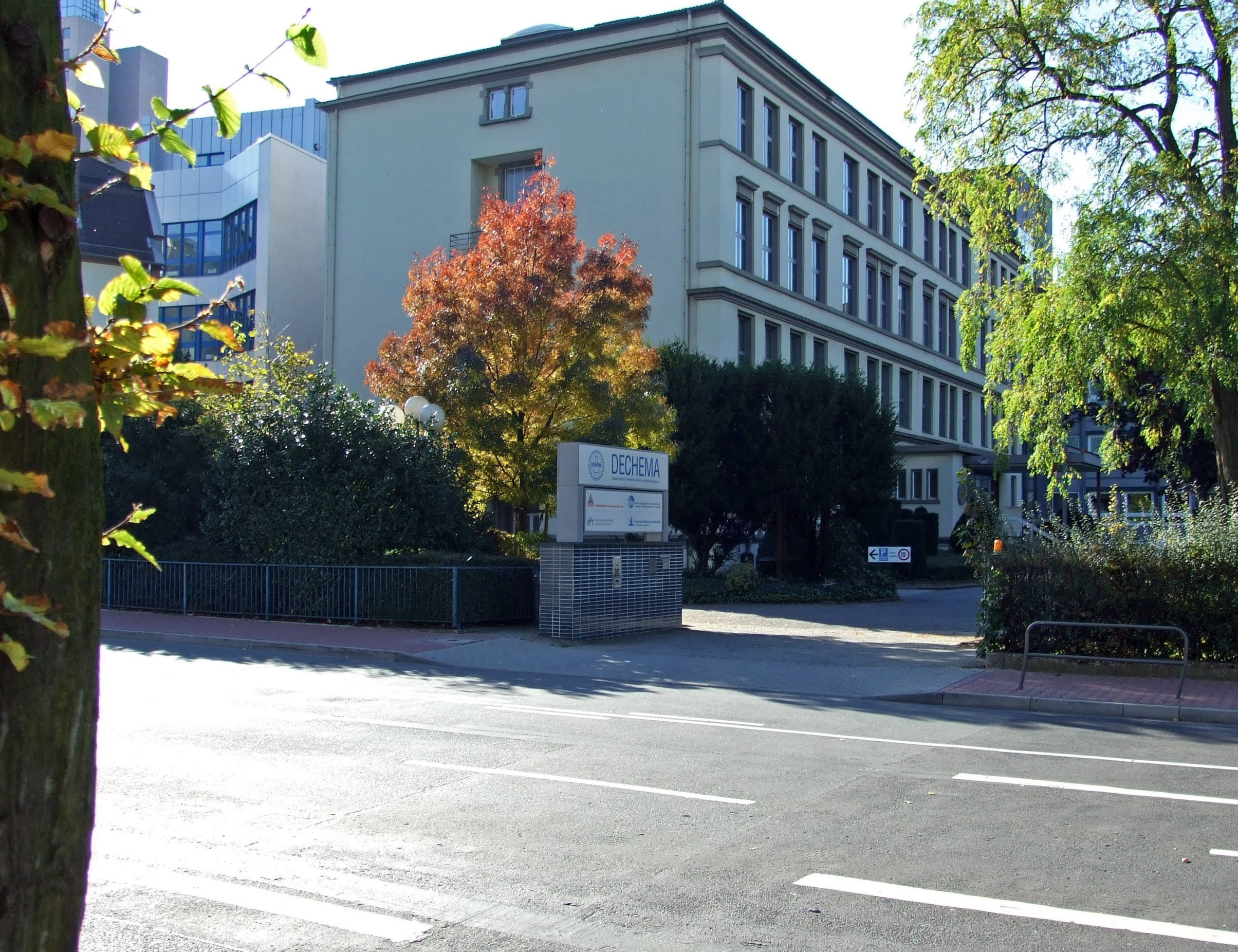
Dechema

DECHEMA is an abbreviation for "Deutsche Gesellschaft für chemisches Apparatewesen" (German Society for Chemical Apparatus), though it has since been expanded to "Deutsche Gesellschaft für Chemische Technik und Biotechnologie" (German Society for Chemical Engineering and Biotechnology).

Founded in 1926, this is a non-profit organisation based in Frankfurt. It has over 5000 chemists, biotechnologists, and engineers as personal members, as well as other organisations and company members. DECHEMA awards prizes, such as the DECHEMA medal "for outstanding achievements in the field of chemical apparatus technology."

The main purpose of Dechema is to support developments in chemical technology, biotechnology, and environmental protection. It is seen as an interface between science, economy, industry, and the public. To this purpose the trade fair ACHEMA is organised and held every three years in Frankfurt am Main, Germany, as the biggest event for chemical technology and biotechnology.

DECHEMA is a member of the European Federation of Chemical Engineering, and acts as joint Secretariat.

== See also ==
- Elektrolytdatenbank Regensburg
- Dortmund Data Bank
