= European Federation of Chemical Engineering =

- Abbreviation: EFCE
- Formation: 1953
- Legal status: Non-Profit Association
- Purpose: General Advancement of Chemical Engineering
- Location: Europe
- Region served: Europe
- President: Jarka Glassey
- Website: http://www.efce.info/

The European Federation of Chemical Engineering (EFCE), also known as Fédération Européenne du Génie Chimique and Europäische Föderation für Chemie-Ingenieur-Wesen, is an association of professional societies in Europe concerned with chemical engineering. It was formed in Paris on 20 June 1953 with 18 societies in 8 countries. India was the first non-European member in 1956 and Czechoslovakia was the first Eastern European member, joining in 1966.

As of November 2016, it has 38 member societies in 29 countries joining 162000 individual chemical engineers. The EFCE passport programme allows members of one society some of the benefits of membership in other societies when travelling abroad, particularly for conferences.

It has a set of 20 Working Parties and 5 Sections comprising about 1000 industrial and academic experts on different subjects who meet to facilitate international cooperation and progress in their specialist areas. The Working Party on Education has published documents on the Bologna process. The working party on Characterisation of particulate systems (ChOPS) is working closely with authorities and analyses the influence of particles in combination with challenges like the Dieselgate.

The Secretariat is jointly administered by IChemE (UK), DECHEMA e.V. (Germany) and Société Française de Génie des Procédés (France). The current president (6 November 2025) is Professor Jarka Glassey of Newcastle University.

News of the EFCE are published in Chemical Engineering Research and Design. Official meetings are usually held in association with the two series of European congresses known as ECCE and CHISA .
