= Aspen Technology =

U.S. information technology company

Aspen Technology, Inc.
- Trade name: AspenTech
- Type: Subsidiary
- Traded as: Nasdaq: AZPN
- Industry: Software; Process Manufacturing
- Founded: August 12, 1981; 45 years ago
- Headquarters: Bedford, Massachusetts, U.S.
- Key people: Antonio J. Pietri (CEO)
- Revenue: ▲US$598.7 million (2020)
- Operating income: ▲US$271 million (2020)
- Net income: ▲US$250 million (2020)
- Number of employees: 1,466 (2018)
- Parent: Emerson Electric (100%)
- Website: aspentech.com

Aspen Technology, Inc., known as AspenTech, is a provider of software and services for the process industries headquartered in Bedford, Massachusetts. AspenTech has 35 offices globally.

== History ==
Founded in 1981, AspenTech was born out of a joint research project between the Massachusetts Institute of Technology (MIT) and US Department of Energy—called the Advanced System for Process Engineering (ASPEN) Project.

Aspen held its IPO in November 1994.

On July 15, 2004, AspenTech was required by the Federal Trade Commission to make divestitures in regard to an anti-trust ruling against its acquisition of HyproTech. This included divestment of batch and continuous simulation systems and integrated engineering software business (AXSYS). In the same year, a class action lawsuit was filed against Aspen Technology and its certain officers over issuance of misleading statements and improper revenue recognition.

On November 24, 2004, the company restated results for the fiscal years ended June 2000 through June 2004 after its audit committee discovered the company improperly accounted for certain software licenses. On March 15, 2005, the company announced that the Audit Committee of the Company's Board of Directors had completed its previously announced financial review and the company had restated its financials for each of the fiscal years ended June 30, 2000 through June 30, 2004. The company's former CEO, David McQuillin, was sentenced in 2007 to 6 months' house arrest and 3 years' probation after pleading guilty to falsifying revenue figures.

In October 2007, Aspen moved its headquarters from Cambridge, Massachusetts to Burlington, Massachusetts.

Aspen Technology was delisted from the NASDAQ on February 19, 2008 for failing to meet the financial transparency guidelines of the NASDAQ exchange. In February 2010 the company was relisted on the NASDAQ exchange.

In November 2014, Aspen Technology moved its headquarters from Burlington to Bedford, Massachusetts.

In July 2019, Aspen Technology signed an agreement to acquire Montreal-based Mnubo Inc.

In September 2020, Aspen Technology partnered with Wood (Aberdeen, Scotland). The collaboration will allow Aspen's Mtell clients to create foretelling strategies focused on industrial AI and machine learning.

In November 2020, Aspen Technology acquired Camo Analytics AS, a company that provided industrial analytics software such as Unscrambler.

In May 2022, Aspen Technology was merged with the industrial software businesses of Emerson Electric, OSI Inc. and Geological Simulation Software, to form a new corporate entity, still called Aspen Technology. Emerson paid US$6 billion and received a controlling interest (55%) of the common stock of the new entity. The stock ticker of Aspen did not change, although the CIK number was changed.

In October 2022, Aspen Technology announced the acquisition of inmation Software GmbH based in Cologne, Germany to strengthen their data management functionality. In February 2023, announced the combination of its AIoT Hub with AspenTech Inmation, forming a rebranded business unit now called AspenTech DataWorks.

In January 2025, Emerson agreed to buy the remaining 43% stake in Aspen for $7.2 billion.

== Corporate turnaround ==
Under former CEO Mark Fusco, AspenTech executed a corporate turnaround strategy. Examples of steps taken during this period included:

- Consolidating facilities with regional head offices in the Americas, EMEA and Asia Pacific.
- Reducing the R&D facilities from 19 to 3 globally—Process Modeling based in Burlington, Massachusetts; Manufacturing and Supply Chain Center of Excellence in Houston, Texas; Quality Assurance Center in Shanghai, China.
- Reorganizing the professional services business unit—new organization structure and management, and streamlining operations.

On April 30, 2013, AspenTech announced that Mark Fusco would retire as President & CEO effective September 30, 2013. On October 1, 2013, Antonio Pietri became AspenTech President & CEO.
