= List of chemical engineers =

This is a list of notable chemical engineers, people who studied or practiced chemical engineering. The main list is those who achieved status in chemical engineering or a closely related field such as management or science. At the foot of the page is a list of people with chemical engineering qualifications who are notable for other reasons, such as actors, sportspeople and authors. These are people sufficiently notable to have an article in Wikipedia. Further articles on chemical engineers would be welcome. See the talk page for suggestions of people who should be added to the encyclopedia (and then to this list).

Name	Known for	Affiliation
== A ==
Rakesh Agrawal	National Medal of Technology and Innovation for Air separation.	Air Products and now at Purdue University
Mohammed Al Mady	Executive president of SABIC.	SABIC
Sara Akbar	Chief Executive Officer of Kuwait Energy and the Kuwaiti oil fires.	Kuwait University
Mukesh Ambani (born 1957)	Chairman and managing director of Reliance Industries	Reliance Industries
Neal Amundson (1916–2011)	Chairman of the Department of Chemical Engineering at University of Minnesota from 1949 to 1977. Professor, chemical engineering and mathematics 1978–2011, and provost (1987–1989) at University of Houston.	University of Minnesota and University of Houston
C. Anandharamakrishnan (born 1973)	Principal Scientist and Pioneer in Engineered human stomach and small intestinal system, Food Nanotechnology, Food 3D printing	Indian Institute of Food Processing Technology, Thanjavur, Tamil Nadu, India
Leonid Andrussow (1896–1988)	Developed process to make hydrogen cyanide from ammonia and methane	IG Farben (now BASF)
Rutherford Aris (1929–2005)	Regents Professor Emeritus of Chemical Engineering at the University of Minnesota (1958–2005). Pioneered the use of computers to solve optimization problems in kinetics and catalysis. Prolific publication record (see Rutherford Aris bibliography).	University of Minnesota
Frances Arnold (born 1956)	Pioneer of directed evolution of proteins, the process of using random mutations to optimize protein function. Nobel Prize in Chemistry, 2018	California Institute of Technology
== B ==
Robin Batterham (born 1941)	Former Chief Scientist of Australia (1999–2006); Chief Scientist of CSIRO Division of Mineral Engineering	Office of the Chief Scientist (Australia)
Jay Bailey (1944–2001)	Pioneer in metabolic engineering	California Institute of Technology (1980–1992), ETH Zurich (1992–2001)
Frank S. Bates (born 1954)	Leader in polymer science and block copolymers	University of Minnesota
Henry Bessemer (1813–1898)	Invented Bessemer process for manufacturing steel	Independent inventor
Gordon Beveridge (1933–1999)	Former president and vice-chancellor of Queen's University of Belfast	Queen's University of Belfast
Lois Aileen Bey (born 1929)	First woman to graduate in chemical engineering from IIT	Illinois Institute of Technology
Samuel Bodman (1938–2018)	United States Secretary of Energy (2005–2009)	US Government
Carl Bosch (1874–1940)	From 1908 until 1913 developed the Haber-Bosch process together with Fritz Haber. His other notable work was for the introduction of high-pressure chemistry. Nobel Prize in Chemistry, 1931	BASF and IG Farben
Henry T. Brown (1932–2020)	First African American director of the American Institute of Chemical Engineers (1983)	Polaroid Corporation (before: Esso Research & Engineering Company and ER Squibb & Sons)
Jomar Brun (1904–1993)	Designer of the world's first industrial heavy water plant, and helped in its sabotage during World War II	Norwegian Institute of Technology
== C ==
John G. Collier (1935–1995)	Two-phase flow and nuclear power expert, head of United Kingdom Atomic Energy Authority and Central Electricity Generating Board	United Kingdom Atomic Energy Authority
John Coulson (1910–1990)	Co-author of what became the standard UK textbook set; Coulson & Richardson's Chemical Engineering	Newcastle University, UK
== D ==
Donald A. Dahlstrom (1920–2005)	Inventor of the Hydrocyclone and related correlations, 1943. Elected to National Academy of Engineering in 1975 for, "Contributions to liquid-solids separation processes in mineral recovery and waste disposal"".	University of Utah
Zara Salim Davidson (born 1973)	Raja Puan Besar of Perak. Heads petroleum and petrochemical consulting firm in Malaysia.	
George E. Davis (1850–1907)	Regarded as the 'founding father' of Chemical Engineering	University of Manchester
Nguyet Anh Duong (born 1960)	is a Vietnamese-American, she assisted in creating a new weapon called the Thermobaric weapon in support of Operation Enduring Freedom to assault tunnels and caves being used as hideouts by the Taliban in Afghanistan.	United States Department of Defense
John Drosdick (born 1943)	Chairman and CEO of Sunoco	Sunoco
== E == == F ==
James R. Fair (1920–2010)	Notable authority on process design, equipment design and separations	Monsanto Company, University of Texas
Richard Felder (born 1939)	Multiple award-winning engineering educator	North Carolina State University
Ian Fells	Energy expert and popular science broadcaster	Newcastle University, UK
Maria das Graças Foster (born 1953)	CEO of Petrobras. First woman to head a major oil-and-gas company	Petrobras, Brazil
Arthur Fry (born 1931)	Inventor of Post-it note	3M, USA
== G ==
G. D. Yadav (born 1952)	Emeritus Professor and Distinguished Scientist	Institute of Chemical Technology, Mumbai, India
Clifton C. Garvin (1921–2016)	Chairman and CEO	Exxon
Eugenio Garza Lagüera (1923–2008)	Chairman and CEO	FEMSA
Karen Klincewicz Gleason	Namesake of Klincewicz method to predict critical values of pure components	Massachusetts Institute of Technology
Edwin R. Gilliland (1909–1963)	Namesake of the Gilliland correlation used in designing distillation columns	Massachusetts Institute of Technology
Roberto Goizueta (1931–1997)	Former chairman and chief executive of Coca-Cola	Coca-Cola
Alexander Goldberg (1906–1985)	President of the Technion – Israel Institute of Technology	Technion – Israel Institute of Technology
Bill Gore (1912–1986)	Founder of W. L. Gore and Associates	W. L. Gore & Associates, DuPont
Robert W. Gore (1937–2020)	The inventor of Gore-Tex	W. L. Gore & Associates
Praveen Kumar Gorakavi (born 1989)	well recognised as Polymath and former child prodigy. Multi award winner	Partner at The Phi Factory
Andrew Grove (1936–2016)	former chairman and CEO	Intel
Pierre Gy (1924–2015)	developed theory of sampling of particulate materials for analysis	Industrial consultant
== H ==
Fritz Haber (1868–1934)	Received Nobel Prize in Chemistry 1918 for the fixation of nitrogen from the air, the Haber process; also developed chemical warfare agents for the German government during World War I. Received the Rumford Medal in 1932 for, "... the outstanding importance of his work in physical chemistry, especially in the application of thermodynamics to chemical reactions".	Karlsruhe Institute of Technology
Vladimir Haensel (1914–2002)	Inventor of the "Platforming" (Platinum Reforming) process, which led to the production of low cost high octane gasoline, and contributed to development of catalytic converters for automobiles.	University of Massachusetts Amherst
Judith Hackitt (born 1954)	Former chair of UK Health & Safety Executive and former president of Institution of Chemical Engineers.	Health & Safety Executive
Douglas Patrick Harrison	Carried out research for DOE Vision 21 project as well research to remove CO2 from stack gas of coal-fired power generators and for production of pure Hydrogen from gasification of coal.	Louisiana State University
Fred Hassan (born 1945)	CEO and chairman of Schering-Plough Corporation; former chairman and CEO for the Pharmacia Corporation	Schering-Plough
Beatrice Hicks (1919–1979)	Co-founder and first president of the Society of Women Engineers	Society of Women Engineers
Csaba Horváth (1930–2004)	Pioneer of modern separation science	Yale University
Benjamin Hsiao (born 1958)	Vice-President for Research and Chief Research Officer at Stony Brook University; also the current spokesperson of the Advanced Polymers PRT Beamline at the National Synchrotron Light Source located at Brookhaven National Laboratory	Stony Brook University; DuPont Company; Brookhaven National Laboratory
Hong Wai Onn (born 1981)	First Malaysian engineer granted the Freedom of the City of London; known for contributions to the circular economy and biomass valorisation; co-founder of the IChemE Palm Oil Processing Special Interest Group.	Research Institute for Sustainable Excellence and Leadership
== I ==
Sheldon E. Isakoff	Former director of DuPont and former president of American Institute of Chemical Engineers	DuPont & American Institute of Chemical Engineers
Dan Itse (born 1958)	US Politician and holder of four patents on low-emission technology	Worcester Polytechnic Institute
== J ==
Lisa P. Jackson (born 1962)	Former administrator of the U.S. Environmental Protection Agency (2009–2013)	Environmental Protection Agency
Joseph J. Jacobs (1916–2004)	Founder of Jacobs Engineering Group	Jacobs Engineering Group
Rakesh Jain (born 1950)	Integrated bioengineering with tumor biology and imaging gene expression and functions in vivo for drug delivery in tumors	Harvard Medical School
Mae Jemison (born 1956)	Science mission specialist on the Space Shuttle Endeavour and first black woman in space	NASA
== K ==
W. W. Keeler (1908–1987)	President and CEO of Phillips Petroleum Company. Graduated in chemical engineering from University of Kansas	Phillips Petroleum Company
Trevor Kletz (1922–2013)	Author of books dealing with chemical engineering safety	Loughborough University
Marius Kloppers (born 1962)	CEO of BHP	BHP
Riki Kobayashi (1924–2013)	Professor of Chemical Engineering; well known for his pioneering work in phase equilibrium, physical properties and transport properties which were highly important to the development of the natural gas processing industries.	Rice University
Charles Koch (born 1935)	CEO of Koch Industries	Koch Industries
David Koch (3 May 1940 – 23 August 2019)	Executive vice-president of Koch Industries	Koch Industries
Fred C. Koch (1900–1967)	Founder of Koch Industries	Koch Industries
B. D. Kulkarni (1949–2019)	Chemical Engineer and Distinguished Scientist	National Chemical Laboratory, Pune, Maharastra, India
== L ==
Robert Langer (born 1948)	Tissue Engineering and Controlled-Release Drug Delivery pioneer	Massachusetts Institute of Technology
Nicolas Leblanc (1742–1806)	Inventor of the Leblanc process for making sodium carbonate from common salt	
Frank Lees (1939–1999)	author and pioneer of Loss Prevention in the process industries	Loughborough University
Warren K. Lewis (1882–1975)	American chemical engineering professor; played a role in defining the field of chemical engineering during its early development. Co-developer (with E. R. Gilliland) of Houdry process for petroleum refining. He is also known as the "Father of Modern Chemical Engineering"	Massachusetts Institute of Technology
Bodo Linnhoff (born 1948)	Author of a 1977 thesis that formed the basis for pinch analysis, a methodology to optimize energy usage in processes.	Linnhoff March
Arthur Dehon Little (1863–1935)	Consultant and co-founder, with William H. Walker, of Arthur D. Little, a major consulting firm	Arthur D. Little, Massachusetts Institute of Technology
Andrew Liveris (born 1954)	Chairman and CEO of Dow Chemical Company.	Dow Chemical Company
Yueh-Lin Loo	Inventor of nanotransfer printing; professor of engineering	Princeton University
== M ==
Ramesh Mashelkar (born 1943)	Leading architect of India's science and technology policies and current president of Global Research Alliance. Former director general of the Council of Scientific & Industrial Research.	CSIR India, Global Research Alliance
Sheri McCoy (born 1959)	Former CEO of Avon Products.	Avon Products
Thomas Midgley Jr. (1889–1944)	American mechanical and chemical engineer, best known for the development of leaded gasoline and Freon / chlorofluorocarbons (CFCs).	General Motors
Victor Mills (1897–1997)	Leading the team that created the modern disposable diapers and the Pampers brand	
Luis E. Miramontes (1925–2004)	Inventor of the hormone used in the first oral contraceptives	Syntex
Mario Molina (1943–2020)	Co-recipient of the 1995 Nobel Prize in Chemistry for his role in elucidating the threat of chlorofluorocarbon gases to the Earth's ozone layer	
Jim May (1934–2023)	Chief Scientist of the Chemical Engineering section at the Australian Atomic Energy Commission in 1967 and CEO of the Australian Minerals Industry Research Association Limited (AMIRA) from 1968 to 1994.	AMIRA, University of South Australia, University of Queensland
== N ==
Dudley Maurice Newitt (1894–1980)	Scientific director of Special Operations Executive developing gadgets for spies during World War II – a real life Q (James Bond). Received Rumford Medal, in 1962 for "... his distinguished contributions to chemical engineering."	Professor at Imperial College
Giulio Natta (1903–1979)	Received Nobel Prize in 1963 for his works on high polymers	Professor at Politecnico di Milano
== O ==
Lars Onsager (1903–1976)	Nobel Prize in Chemistry, 1968	Yale University
Adam Osborne (1939–2003)	Introduced the first-ever portable computer in 1981, the same year IBM launched the personal computer	Osborne Computer Corporation
Donald Othmer (1904–1995)	Co-creator of the Kirk-Othmer Encyclopedia of Chemical Technology	Polytechnic University of New York
David J. O'Reilly (born 1947)	Chairman and CEO of Chevron Corporation	Chevron Corporation
== P ==
Linus Pauling (1901–1994)	Nobel Prize in Chemistry, 1954, Nobel Peace Prize, 1962	California Institute of Technology, Oregon State University
Robert H. Perry (1924–1978)	Author of Handbook in 1934, now Perry's Chemical Engineers' Handbook	University of Oklahoma
Martin Lewis Perl (1927–2014)	Winner of the Nobel Prize in Physics for his discovery of the tau lepton	Stanford Linear Accelerator Center
Nicholas A. Peppas (born 1948)	Pioneer in drug delivery, biomaterials, hydrogels and nanobiotechnology	University of Texas at Austin
== Q ==
K. B. Quinan (1878–1948)	Explosive manufacturing expert in World War I and first vice-president of the Institution of Chemical Engineers	De Beers
== R ==
Sabah Randhawa (born 1954)	Academic administrator and former engineer	Western Washington University
Lee Raymond (born 1938)	ExxonMobil chairman and Chief Executive Officer	ExxonMobil
Max Reis (1927–2014)	chemical engineer and President of the	Technion – Israel Institute of Technology
Dan Reneau (born 1940)	President of Louisiana Tech University	Louisiana Tech University
George Maxwell Richards (1931–2018)	President of Trinidad & Tobago. Previously worked for Shell Trinidad Oil Co. and taught chemical engineering at University of West Indies	
Jack Richardson (1920–2011)	Co-wrote the textbook which became UK standard Coulson & Richardson's Chemical Engineering	Swansea University
Norbert Rillieux (1806–1894)	Inventor who is most noted for developing the process that turned sugar from a luxury to a common commodity	
Margaret Hutchinson Rousseau (1911–2000)	designed the first commercial penicillin production plant	
== S ==
Albert Sacco (born 1949)	US astronaut	Worcester Polytechnic Institute
Robert Satcher (born 1965)	US astronaut	NASA
Lanny Schmidt (1938–2020)	Surface science and detailed chemistry	University of Minnesota
Man Mohan Sharma (born 1937)	Eminent Indian chemical engineering scientist and first Indian engineer to be elected as a Fellow of Royal Society, UK	Former director of Institute of Chemical Technology
Waldo L. Semon (1898–1999)	Inventor who patented more than 116 inventions, including polyvinyl chloride (PVC)	BF Goodrich
L. Douglas Smoot (born 1934)	Research on aerospace and rocket fuel propulsion	Brigham Young University, California Institute of Technology, Lockheed Propulsion Company, Scientific Research Society of America
== T ==
Edward Teller (1908–2003)	Hungarian-born American theoretical physicist and "father of the hydrogen bomb"	University of Göttingen Bohr Institute University College London George Washington University Manhattan Project University of Chicago UC Davis UC Berkeley Lawrence Livermore Hoover Institution
Gautam Thapar (born 1960)	CEO of Indian conglomerate Avantha Group	Avantha Group
Martha J. B. Thomas (1926–2006)	American chemical engineer who worked on fluorescent lighting and phosphorus	Radcliffe College, Boston University, Sylvania Electric Products
Zehev Tadmor (born 1937)	former President of Technion-Israel Institute of Technology	Technion-Israel Institute of Technology
== U ==
Lewis Urry (1927–2004)	Invention of long-lasting alkaline batteries	Eveready Battery Co
== W ==
Bill Wakeham (born 1944)	Vice-Chancellor of the University of Southampton (2001–2009) and president of Institution of Chemical Engineers	University of Southampton
William Hultz Walker (1869–1934)	Pioneer in teaching chemical engineering. Co-authored, with W. K. Lewis and W. H. McAdams, the first American textbook of chemical engineering, Principles of Chemical Engineering, published in 1924.	Massachusetts Institute of Technology
Jack Welch (1935–2020)	Former chairman and chief executive officer of General Electric	General Electric
David W. Wood (born 1967)	Ohio State University professor known for work on self-removing affinity tag methods	Ohio State University
Nathaniel C. Wyeth (1911–1990)	Inventor of PET plastic bottles	DuPont
== X == == Y ==
Andrew Yakuba	Former Group Managing Director and Chief Executive Officer	Nigerian National Petroleum Corporation
Yeo Bee Yin (born 1983)	Malaysian Minister of Energy, Science, Technology, Environment and Climate Change. Started her career as a field engineer in the petroleum industry	Ministry of Energy, Science, Technology, Environment and Climate Change (Malaysia)
== Chemical engineers who became notable for other activities ==
- Ramani Ayer, CEO of The Hartford, earned a master's and PhD in chemical engineering from Drexel University
- Rajeev Bajaj, self-published the educational geek rap album Geek Rhythms in 2004
- Jacques Bergier, French writer, graduated in chemical engineering from Chimie ParisTech and worked on early nuclear engineering
- Garry Betty, contributor to the design of the original personal computer; earned a chemical engineering degree at Georgia Tech
- Harsha Bhogle, Indian international cricket commentator, chemical engineering degree from Osmania University
- Jerzy Buzek, former Prime Minister of Poland and President of the European Parliament
- Frank Capra, movie director, earned a chemical engineering degree at California Institute of Technology
- Ray Davis, U.S. General and recipient of the U.S. Medal of Honor, graduated with a degree in chemical engineering from Georgia School of Technology
- Thierry Dusautoir, captain of the French National Rugby Union team, studied chemical engineering at the École Nationale Supérieure in Bordeaux
- Vilma Espin, Cuban revolutionary and former wife of Raúl Castro, studied chemical engineering at the Massachusetts Institute of Technology
- Gallagher, standup comedian, earned a chemical engineering degree at the University of South Florida
- Kevin Greening, science presenter on BBC Radio 5 Live (UK), studied chemical engineering at St Catharine's College, Cambridge
- Hu Tsu Tau Richard, former Minister for Finance (Singapore) (1985–2001)
- Pat Kenny, broadcaster, earned a chemical engineering degree from University College Dublin
- Bill Koch, businessman and skipper of 1992 America's Cup winning yacht
- Ashok Kumar, Indian-born British Labour politician, BSc, MSc, PhD in chemical engineering at Aston University
- Dolph Lundgren, actor and karateka, earned an undergraduate chemical engineering degree from the Royal Institute of Technology and a master's degree in chemical engineering from the University of Sydney
- Khalid Masud, Muslim scholar from Pakistan, obtained a master's degree in chemistry from the University of the Punjab and a chemical engineering diploma from King's College, Cambridge
- John von Neumann, mathematician and physicist, studied chemical engineering at ETH-Zurich
- Nitin Nohria, Dean of Harvard Business School, gained BTech in chemical engineering from the Indian Institute of Technology Bombay
- Seyi Olofinjana, Nigerian international footballer, earned degree in chemical engineering from Ladoke Akintola University of Technology
- Michael Ruffin, American professional basketball player, earned degree in chemical engineering from University of Tulsa
- Tuanku Zara Salim, Queen of Perak, degree in chemical engineering from the University of Nottingham and worked for Petrona
- E. E. Smith, science fiction author of the Lensman and Skylark series fame; earned a PhD in chemical engineering from George Washington University
- Srinivas, Indian playback singer, earned degree in chemical engineering from University of Mumbai
- William Tebeau (1925–2013), American civil engineer, studied chemical engineering at Oregon State University
- Xi Jinping, current CPC General Secretary and President of China, studied chemical engineering at Tsinghua University
- Benjamin Lee Whorf, American linguist, earned a degree in chemical engineering from Massachusetts Institute of Technology
- Eugene Wigner, Nobel Prize in Physics for atomic theory, degree in chemical engineering from Technische Universität Berlin
- Nadhim Zahawi, UK politician and minister, has a BSc in chemical engineering from University College London

== Chemical engineers in fiction ==
- In the Charlie Chan film The Shanghai Cobra (1945), "H.R. Jarvis, Chemical Engineer" is stenciled on the laboratory door rented by the eponymous villain who had been using that alias while he schemed to steal radium from a nearby bank vault.
- In the CBS radio thriller The House in Cypress Canyon, which aired live on 5 December 1945, on "Suspense Radio," the character "James A. Woods, Chemical Engineer" was the perpetrator of a murder-suicide and was the narrator/protagonist of the supernatural yarn found in a shoebox, the basis of the story.
- In a 1958 episode of Alfred Hitchcock Presents, "The Motive", character Tom Greer kills a man he finds in the phone book, who happens to be a chemical engineer.
- Captain Virgil "The Cooler King" Hilts, as portrayed by Steve McQueen in the 1963 film The Great Escape
- Graeme Miller, played by Ewen Bremner in the 2004 film AVP: Alien vs. Predator
- Stanley Goodspeed, played by Nicolas Cage in The Rock
- Gunner Jensen, played by Dolph Lundgren in the 2012 film The Expendables 2
- Comic Book Guy in The Simpsons has a degree in chemical engineering.

== See also ==
- Lists of notable engineers by discipline for lists of engineers by discipline.
