= Petrona (given name) =

Petrona is a given name. Notable people with the name include:

- Doña Petrona (Petrona Carrizo de Gandulfo, 1896–1992), Argentine cookbook writer
- Petrona Eyle (1866–1945), Argentine physician and feminist campaigner
- Petrona García Morales (1817–1857), wife of the first president of Guatemala
- Petrona Hernández López (1890-2007), better known as Amanda Aguilar, a revolutionary from Nicaragua
- Petrona Lashley (1941–2000), British politician and community activist
- Petrona Martínez (born 1939), Colombian singer-songwriter
- Petrona Mejía (born 1973), Guatemalan politician and indigenous human rights activist
- Petrona Morrison (born 1954), Jamaican sculptor and media artist
- Petrona Rosende (1797–1863), Argentinian journalist
- Petrona Viera (María Petrona Viera Garino, 1895–1960), Uruguayan painter
