= Petrona =

Petrona may refer to:

- Petronà, a town in the province of Catanzaro in the Calabria region of Italy
- Petrona (given name), including a list of people with the name

== See also ==
- Petronas (disambiguation)
- Punta Petrona Natural Reserve, in Puerto Rico
