= Global Research =

Global Research may refer to:

- Global Research Alliance, a New Delhi organization promoting the Millennium Development Goals through R&D
- GE Global Research, R&D division of General Electric
- Global Research Council, an organization facilitating national science funding agencies' conferences
- Globalresearch.ca, a conspiracy website operated by Michel Chossudovsky's Centre for Research on Globalization
