= Perton (disambiguation) =

Perton may refer to:

== Settlements ==
- Perton a village in Staffordshire, England.
- Perton, Herefordshire, a hamlet in Herefordshire, England

== People ==
- Victor Perton (born 1958), Australian politician

== Petron ==
- Petron (physician) (Πέτρων), also called Petronas, an ancient Greek physician
- Petron, an ancient Greek writer from the city of Himera in Sicily, mentioned by Plutarch in the "De defectu oraculorum"
- Petron, a Philippine oil/gas company
