= Nadia de León Torres =

Guatemalan politician

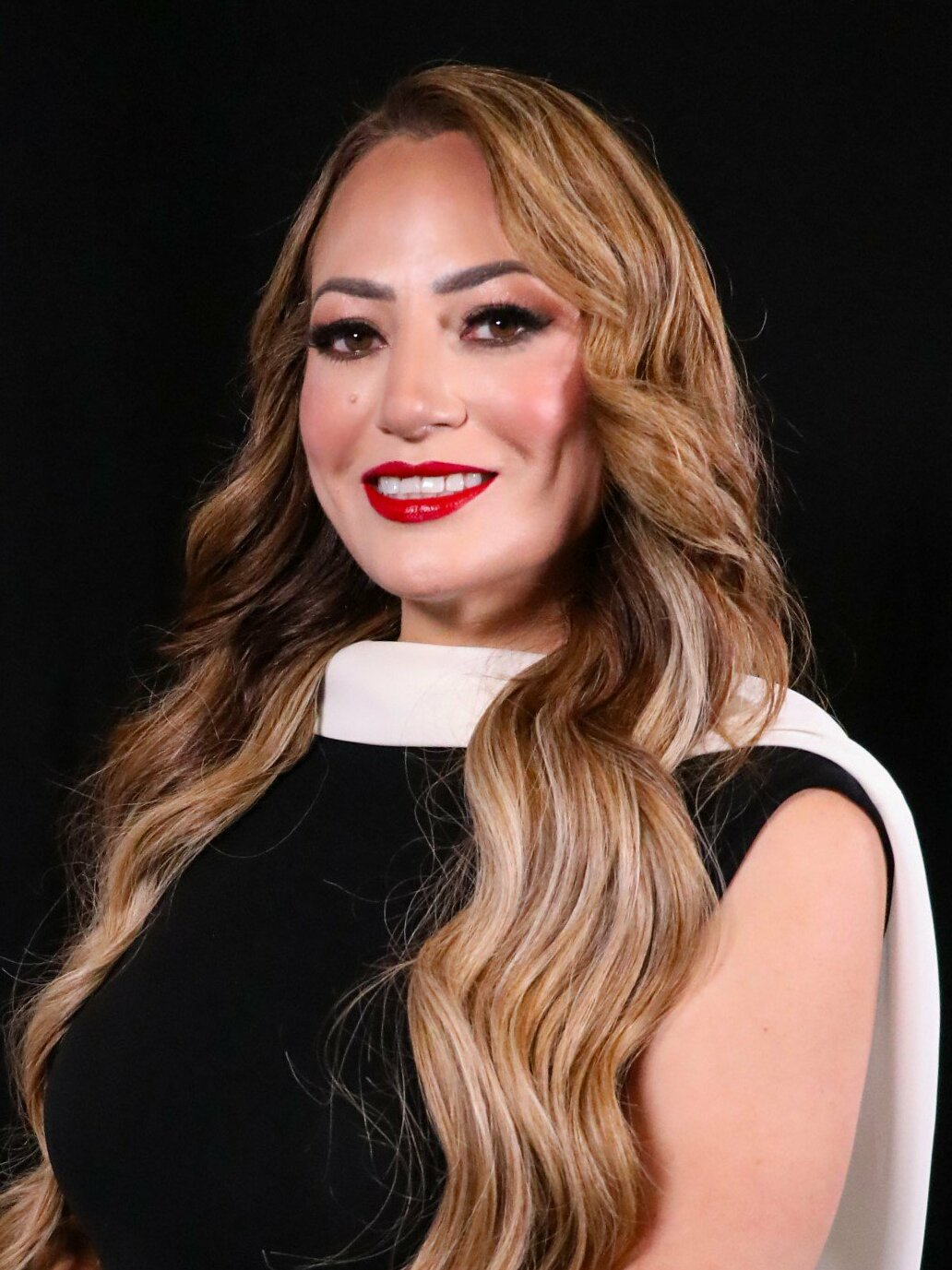
- Official portrait, 2024

Member of the Congress of Guatemala
- Incumbent
- Assumed office 14 January 2024
- Constituency: National List

President of the Central American Parliament
- In office 15 January 2020 – 28 August 2020
- Preceded by: Alfonso Fuentes Soria
- Succeeded by: Fanny Salinas Fernández

Member of the Central American Parliament
- In office 14 January 2020 – 14 January 2024
- Constituency: Guatemala

Personal details
- Born: May 21, 1978 (age 48) Guatemala Department
- Party: National Unity of Hope (until 2024; since 2026)
- Other political affiliations: Nosotros (2023–2026)
- Spouse: Rudy Guzmán
- Parents: Edgar Augusto de León (father); Sandra Torres (mother)

Nadia Lorena de León Torres is a Guatemalan politician serving as a deputy of the Congress since January 2024. She was leader of Nosotros, alongside her former husband Rudy Guzmán.

== Political career ==
She served a member of the Central American Parliament for the National Unity of Hope from 2020 to 2024 and served as President of the Central American Parliament.

== Personal life ==
She is the daughter of former First Lady Sandra Torres.
