= Nosotros (political party) =

Us Nosotros
- Abbreviation: PPN
- Leader: Rudy Guzmán
- Secretary-General: Rudy Guzmán
- Founded: 2020
- Legalised: 22 April 2022
- Split from: National Unity of Hope
- Ideology: Populism
- Political position: Right-wing
- Colors: Red; Blue
- Seats in Congress: 3 / 160

Website
- nosotrosguatemala.com

Nosotros (lit. 'Us') is a political party in Guatemala.

== History ==
The political party was founded in 2020 by Rudy Guzmán and his wife Nadia de León Torres. The party was registered by the Supreme Electoral Tribunal in May 2022.

Nadia de León Torres is the daughter of former First Lady Sandra Torres, and member of the Central American Parliament for the National Unity of Hope since 2020 and she was President of the Central American Parliament.

The political party describes itself as "independent" of Sandra Torres and the National Unity of Hope, although at that time they did not rule out forming a coalition with the UNE in 2023 general election.

On 22 January 2023, Nosotros nominated party leader Rudy Guzmán as presidential candidate, and Diego González, a member of Congress for Vamos, as vice presidential candidate.

Deputies Carlos Mencos and Petrona Mejía, elected by the National Unity of Hope in 2019 will opt for re-election by the PPN. Nadia de León divorced Guzmán in 2026 and announced her return to the National Unity of Hope.

== Electoral history ==
=== Presidential elections ===
Election	Candidates		First round		Second round		Status
Election	President	Vice President	Votes	%	Votes	%	Status
2023	Rudy Guzmán	Diego González	66,116	1.57 (#12)	—N/a	—N/a	Lost ✗

=== Legislative elections ===
Election	Votes	%	Seats	+/–	Status
2023	131,217	3.15 (#10)	3 / 160	New	Opposition
