= Margaret Hutchinson Rousseau =

American chemical engineer (1910–2000)

- Born: 27 October 1910
- Died: 12 January 2000 (aged 89)
- Education: Rice Institute (B.S. Chemical Engineering), MIT (Sc.D. Chemical Engineering)
- Occupation: Chemical engineer
- Known for: first commercial penicillin production plant
- Spouse: William Caubu Rousseau
- Children: One son
- Awards: Founders Award AICHE, Achievement Award SWE
- Engineering career
- Employers: E.B. Badger and Sons, Stone and Webster Engineering Corp.
- Projects: Production of ethylene glycol, glacial acetic acid, high-octane gasoline for aviation fuel, and synthetic rubber
- Significant design: Deep-tank fermentation, methanol synthesis and formaldehyde manufacture, ripple tray (patent)

Margaret Hutchinson Rousseau (27 October 1910 – 12 January 2000) was an American chemical engineer who contributed to the first commercial penicillin production plant. She was instrumental in the development of high-octane aviation fuel and was a pioneer in chemical production plant design, performing an impactful role as the fledgling chemical industry expanded rapidly during World War II.

Hutchinson designed many types of chemical and petrochemical plants used across a variety of industries. Her specialization in the research and development of fractionation methods resulted in the development of groundbreaking processes and a “ripple tray” patent.

Hutchinson was recognized with the American Institute of Chemical Engineers Founders Award and the Society of Women Engineers Achievement Award.

== Early life and education ==
Hutchinson was born in 1910 in Houston, Texas, the daughter of a clothing store owner. Her scientific interests began in chemistry class, “where my high school chemistry teacher was very inspirational to me.” “Later, I went on to Rice Institute where I finally realized it was the engineering phase of chemistry which had its appeal for me.” She received her Bachelor of Science degree from Rice Institute in 1932 and following graduate studies, her degree as a chemical engineer from Rice in 1933. Hutchinson went on to receive a Doctor of Science degree in chemical engineering from MIT in 1937. Her thesis topic was The effect of solute on the liquid film resistance in gas absorption.

Hutchinson earned a Professional Engineers license in 1945 in the state of Massachusetts which remained active through 1984.

== Career ==
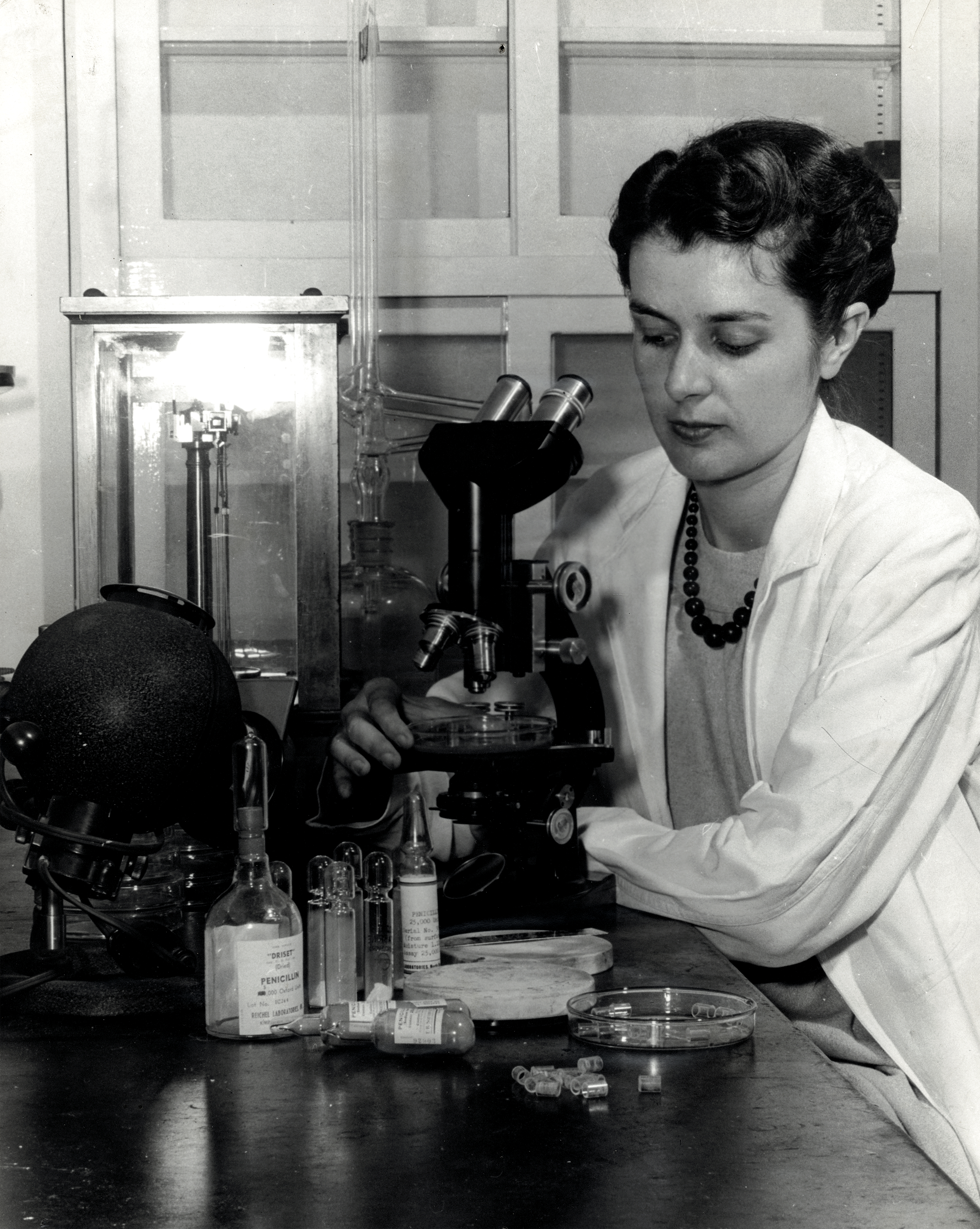
Hutchinson certifying samples of penicillin at the FDA

Hutchinson started her professional career with E. B. Badger and Sons Company in Boston, a petroleum and petrochemical firm. She worked in chemical plant design, research and development related to fractionation.

Hutchinson developed process calculation and project estimates for topping and vacuum units in oil refineries and sulfur dioxide extraction units. She correlated data on designs of bubble caps, tunnel caps and similar equipment, leading to new and improved designs. She is the inventor of a unique fractionating tray design, patented in 1956 in the United States and ten other countries.

During the Second World War, she worked with Pfizer and oversaw the design of production plants for the strategically important materials of penicillin and butadiene plants to produce synthetic rubber. Her development of deep-tank fermentation of penicillium mold enabled large-scale production of penicillin. She worked on the development of high-octane gasoline for aviation fuel.

Throughout her career, Hutchinson developed process designs for methanol synthesis and formaldehyde manufacture. She was the responsible engineer in charge of designs for an ethyl oxide plant and an ethylene glycol plant. During this same period, she developed design data on absolute alcohol and glacial acetic acid and performed laboratory work on sieve design and vapor liquid equilibrium data for low temperature hydrocarbons. Her work resulted in publications on bubble caps and sieve plates.

Hutchinson's later work included improved distillation column design and plants for the production of ethylene glycol and glacial acetic acid.

An ethylene glycol plant was recently in the process of construction deep in the heart of Texas, when an indignant workman watching a tall, blonde beauty boss the project, said to his foreman: "Who does that dame think she is, strutting around here?" "Oh, her!" the foreman shrugged with a grin, "Well, I'll tell you Buck, she's just the dame who designed this whole darn plant."

== Patents ==
Hutchinson was the sole inventor of the 1956 “Fractionating Tray” Patent No. US-2767967_A.

== Awards, honors and organizations ==
Hutchinson was a member of the American Institute of Chemical Engineers, the Massachusetts Society of Professional Engineers, and the National Society of Professional Engineers. Hutchinson joined the Society of Women Engineers in 1953, later serving on the board of trustees and as the 1961 National Convention Chairwoman.

In 1955 Hutchinson received the Achievement Award of the Society of Women Engineers in recognition of her "significant contributions to the field of chemical engineering".

In 1983, she received the Founders Award of the AIChE recognizing her outstanding contributions and advancements to the field of chemical engineering.

== Legacy ==
In 1937, Hutchinson was the first woman to earn a Doctorate of Science degree in chemical engineering from MIT, thirty years after MIT established the program. Dr. Hutchinson paved the way for many woman chemists and chemical engineers to follow in her footsteps at MIT and other higher educational institutions.

In 1945, Hutchinson became the first woman to be accepted as an ‘active’ member of the American Institute of Chemical Engineers. “The membership grade of ‘active’ was very prestigious, given only to engineers who had actually been the principal engineer in charge of the design of an important and successful installation. This grade of membership could not be attained by teaching, working in research, or by functioning as a consulting engineer. Dr. Hutchinson was the only woman elected to this grade of membership at the time.”

In 1983 Hutchinson was the first female recipient of the prestigious Founders Award of the AIChE.

In 2017, the American Institute of Chemical Engineers (AIChE) established the Margaret Hutchinson Rousseau Pioneer Award for Lifetime achievement by a Woman Chemical Engineer. The award honors a woman member of AIChE who has made significant contributions to chemical engineering research or practice. The honoree’s accomplishments also include a component of service, mentorship, or leadership in helping to raise the visibility of women engineers and paving the way for women to have a greater impact in chemical engineering. As of October 2025, recipients of this award include Frances Arnold, Elsa Reichmanis, Paula T. Hammond, Carol K. Hall, Karen K. Gleason, Rena Bizios, Jennifer S. Curtis, and Ümit Özkan.

== Personal life ==
On 1 May 1939, Hutchinson married William Caubu Rousseau, a co-worker at E.B. Badger & Sons, who was later a chemical engineering lecturer at MIT. They had one son, William, born in 1946.

Hutchinson retired in 1961, and later became an overseer of the Boston Symphony Orchestra.

She died 12 January 2000, aged 89, at her home in Weston, Massachusetts.

== See also ==
- Elizabeth Bugie
- Jane Hinton
- Dorothy Hodgkin
- Mattiedna Johnson
- Barbara Low
- List of chemical engineers
- List of people from Massachusetts
