= Petronas (disambiguation) =

Petronas is a Malaysian multinational oil and gas company.

Petronas may also refer to:

- Petronas (general), 9th century Byzantine general and aristocrat
- Petron (physician), also known as Petronas, ancient Greek physician from Aegina
- Petronas Kamateros (fl. 830s), a Byzantine official under Emperor Theophilos

== See also ==
- Petrona (disambiguation)
- Mercedes-AMG Petronas Formula One Team
- Petronas Gallery, a contemporary art gallery in Malaysia
- Petronas Philharmonic Hall, in Kuala Lumpur, Malaysia
- Petronas Towers, an interlinked pair of skyscrapers in Kuala Lumpur, Malaysia
- Petronax of Monte Cassino (670–747), Italian monk who rebuilt the monastery of Monte Cassino
