= Petrona Lashley =

British politician

- Born: 19 January 1941; Barbados
- Died: 2000 (aged 58–59); Liverpool
- Occupations: Politician, community activist
- Organization: Labour Party

Petrona Lashley (19 January 1941–2000) was a British Labour politician and community activist. She was Liverpool's first black Deputy Lord Mayor, and one of its earliest black councillors.

== Early life ==
Petrona Sonia Lashley was born in Barbados, moving to Britain in the 1950s at the age of 17. She trained as a nurse in Hampshire, later moving to Liverpool where her partner worked on ships. Lashley continued to work as a nurse, becoming an equal-opportunities officer in the NHS, and later with the Obstetrics and Gynaecology Trust.

Ahead of her election as a councillor, Lashley was already active in community organizing.

== Political career ==
Lashley was elected as Labour city councillor for Liverpool's Granby Ward in 1991. She succeeded Liz Drysdale, who had been the city's first black woman councillor. Lashley was described as "a hard-working, personally popular councillor", and "very effective in forging political ties with Labour Party leaders". She was made Deputy Lord Mayor, and due to become Lord Mayor during the next election cycle.

In 1994, the Liverpool Echo published the revelation that Lashley had three spent convictions for sex work ("prostitution") dating back to the 1970s, and another for "obtaining property by deception" in 1990. In a statement, Lashley said

I am surprised that so much attention has been paid to spent convictions, the majority of which happened 20 years ago. 'But I am determined that publicity of this nature will not affect my public duties. Since I was elected to the city council in 1991 I have put all my efforts into representing the community which elected me, and I will continue to do so.

Some council colleagues supported Lashley, with Liverpool's Labour council leader Harry Rimmer stating that in the face of great prejudice, Lashley exhibited "a competence and dignity in dealing with people from all walks of life, which in my view render her a first class choice as Lord Mayor.''

She was subsequently deselected by the Labour Party as a council candidate, and her nomination to become Lord Mayor was withdrawn. Lashley's appeal against the decision to deselect her as a Labour candidate was unsuccessful. In 1995, the BBC aired a documentary titled Petrona's Honour, in which Lashley described her efforts to be reinstated as a councillor.

In 1997, Alfred B. Zack-Williams wrote:

The Petrona Lashley Affair split public opinion in Liverpool. Many felt that these convictions were conclusive proof of her unworthiness to become Liverpool’s first citizen. For the already deprived, politically and economically marginalized Black population, this was yet another attempt by the local paparazzi to thwart their ambition of representation at the centre.

Zack-Williams argued that Lashley's treatment served to highlight "the precarious position of Black people within Liverpool economy and society, despite years of the Black presence in this city". Julia Chinyere Oparah similarly argued that "the public humiliation" of Lashley as "the only black woman councillor to be nominated as mayor, and the Labour Party’s subsequent failure to defend her was seen... to highlight the kind of short-lived support which could be expected from a mainly white male movement". Oparah added that "The gender specificity of this allegation, building on stereotypical notions of black women’s supposed promiscuity, indicates the particularly destructive ideological armoury which can be drawn on in order to undermine black women".

== Legacy ==
In 2019, Anna Rothery was appointed Lord Mayor of Liverpool, becoming the first black Lord Mayor of Liverpool. An article in the Liverpool Echo highlighted Lashley's near claim to the title a quarter of a century earlier. In the same year, Kim Johnson became Liverpool's first black MP. She said of Lashley:

I knew her. I knew her kids. I went to school with her kids. She was a strong, formidable Black woman trying to make change in the community. I just think it was despicable what happened to her.
