= Petrona Mejía =

Guatemalan politician

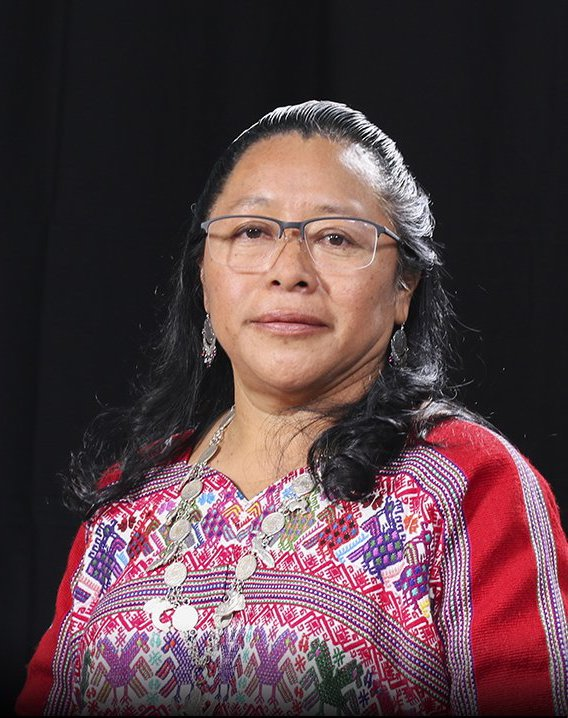
- Official portrait

Member of the Congress of Guatemala
- In office 14 January 2020 – 14 January 2024
- Constituency: Chimaltenango

Personal details
- Born: 4 October 1973 (age 53) Chimaltenango, Guatemala
- Party: Nosotros (since 2023); National Unity of Hope (until 2023)

Petrona Mejía Chutá (born 4 October 1973) is a Guatemalan politician and indigenous human rights activist, from National Unity of Hope party. She was a member of Congress from 2020 to 2024 and served as chair of the Indigenous Peoples Commission of Congress.
