= Douglas Patrick Harrison =

American chemical engineer

Douglas Patrick Harrison (born November 19, 1937, died September 26, 2026) was a professor emeritus of chemical engineering from Louisiana State University's Gordon A. and Mary Cain Department of Chemical Engineering, where he taught undergraduate and graduate classes and served as a dissertation advisor to Ph.D. and M.S. students.

== Biography ==
Douglas P. Harrison received his Ph.D. from the University of Texas in 1966. After three years with Monsanto, he joined Louisiana State University's chemical engineering department in 1969 as an assistant professor. Later, he served as department chair from 1976 to 1979, and then became the Alexis and Marguerite Voorhies Endowed Professor. In 2005, after 36 years of service with LSU, he retired from teaching.

=== Teaching ===
Harrison taught mostly undergraduate courses. After his time as department chair, he continued working closely with the chemical engineering graduate program as a doctoral and master's dissertation adviser. He has helped 10 Ph.D. students and 31 M.S. students complete their programs. He is the only professor to have received the Dow Chemical Excellence in Teaching Award four times (in 1988, 1995, 2000, and 2002).

=== Research ===
Harrison was a researcher with a focus on separation and reaction engineering. His work has primarily centered around non-catalytic gas-solid reactions and gas separation techniques associated with coal-fired power plants. He has also been involved in research related to the production of high-purity hydrogen, greenhouse gas removal from flue gas, and the separation of semi-volatile contaminants from aqueous solutions.

One of his research projects was "High-Efficiency Desulfurization of Synthesis Gas", where the aim was to improve the efficiency of reactions by removing hydrogen sulfide, a pollutant. His now-classic papers on "Evaluation of candidate solids for high-temperature desulfurization of low-Btu gases" and "Comparative kinetics of high-temperature reaction between hydrogen sulfide and selected metal oxides" had 515 and 238 citations ate the time of his passing. Past research has included the use of CeO_{2}-ZrO_{2} sorbent to reduce hydrogen sulfide content.

Dr. Harrison's research also extended to the reduction of CO_{2} emissions from flue gas using regenerable reagents. This research aimed to develop an economical solution for retrofitting existing power plant stacks to mitigate carbon dioxide emissions, which are associated with global warming.

Additionally, Dr. Harrison has been involved in exploring innovative hydrogen production methods in collaboration with Professor Armando Corripio, NASA, and TDA. Their research focuses on achieving 95+% hydrogen production using a single reactor, streamlining the process that previously required three vessels.

Moreover, Dr. Harrison holds a patent, jointly with Klaus S. Lackner and Hans Zoick, for hydrogen production from carbonaceous materials.

== Awards and patents ==
- Masuda Research Fellowship award
- LSU Teaching Dow Award (1988, 1995, 2000, 2002)
- Along with Klaus S. Lackner and Hans Zoick of Earth and Environmental Sciences from Los Alamos, Harrison received U.S. Patent #6,790,430 for Hydrogen Production from Carbonaceous Material.

== Published works ==
- "Evaluation of Candidate Solids for High-Temperature Desulfurization of Low-BTU Gases" with P.R. Westmoreland in Environmental Science & Technology Volume: 10 Issue: 7 Published 1976.
- "Comparative Kinetics of High-Temperature Reaction Between H_{2}S and Selected Metal-Oxides" with P.R. Westmoreland in Environmental Science & Technology Volume: 11 Issue: 5 Published 1977.
- "Laboratory Investigations of Cascade Crossflow Packed Towers for Air Stripping of Volatile Organics from Groundwater" with Douglas P. Harrison, Kalliat T. Valsaraj, Louis J. Thibodeaux, United States. Air Force Civil Engineering Support Agency, Louisiana State University (Baton Rouge, La.). Hazardous Waste Research Center.
- "Zero Emission Coal" published in Energy 2000: The Beginning of a New Millennium: ENERGEX 2000: Proceedings of the 8th International Energy Forum, Las Vegas, July 23–28, 2000 with Hans-Joachim Ziock and Klause S. Lackner.
- "Low-Carbon Monoxide Hydrogen by Sorption" along with research partner Zhiyong Peng; International Journal of Chemical Reactor Engineering Vol. 1: A37.
- "Hydrogen from methane in a single-step process," with Balasubramanian, B., A. Lopez Ortiz, and S. Kaytakoglu, Chemical Engineering Science 54 (1999) 3543–3552.
- "Direct Comparison of Countercurrent and Cascade Crossflow Air Stripping Under Field Conditions", with S. Verma, K.T. Valsaraj, and D.M. Wetzel, Water Research, 28, 2253 (1994).
- "Simultaneous Shift Reaction and Carbon Dioxide Separation for the Direct Production of Hydrogen", with C. Han, Chemical Engineering Science, 49, 5875 (1994).
- "High-Temperature Capture of CO_{2}: Characteristics of the Reversible Reaction Between CaO(s) and CO_{2}(g)", with A. Silaban, Chemical Engineering Communications, 137, 177 (1995).
- "Advanced Sulfur Control Concepts. I." with A. Lopez, J. White, and F.R. Groves, Proceedings of the Symposium on Advanced Coal-Fired Power Systems '95, Morgantown, WV, June 1995, DOE/METC-95/1018, Vol. 2, p. 610.
- "A Calcium Oxide Sorbent Process for Bulk Separation of Carbon Dioxide. VI.", with C. Han and G. Lee, Proceedings of the Symposium on Advanced Coal-Fired Power Systems '95, Morgantown, WV, June 1995, DOE/METC-95/1018, Vol. 2, p. 655.
- "High-Temperature Capture of CO_{2}: Characteristics of the Reversible Reaction Between CaO(s) and CO_{2}(g)," with A. Silaban, Chemical Engineering Communications, 137, 177 (1995).
- "Control of Gaseous Contaminants in IGCC Power Systems, An Overview," Proceedings of the 12th Annual International Pittsburgh Coal Conference, September 1995, p. 1047 (invited review paper).
- "Advanced Sulfur Control Concepts for Hot Gas Desulfurization. II.," with J. White, A. Lopez-Ortiz, W.-N. Huang, and F.R. Groves, Proceedings of the Symposium on Advanced Coal-Fired Power Systems '96, Morgantown, W.V., July 1996, DOE/METC-97/1039 (on CD-ROM).
- "Performance Analysis of ZnO-Based Sorbents in Removal of H_{2}S from Fuel Gas," presented at the NATO/ASI Symposium on Desulfurization of Hot Coal Gas With Regenerable Metal Oxide Sorbents, Kusasadi, Turkey, July 1996, proceedings to be published.
- "Regeneration of Sulfided Sorbents and Direct Production of Elemental Sulfur," presented at the NATO/ASI Symposium on Desulfurization of Hot Coal Gas With Regenerable Metal Oxide Sorbents, Kuşadası, Turkey, July 1996, proceedings to be published.
- "Characteristics of the Reversible Reaction Between CO_{2}(g) and Calcined Dolomite," with A. Silaban and M. Narcida, Chemical Engineering Communications, 147, 149 (1996).
- "On the Performance of a Cascade Crossflow Air Stripping Column," with Y. Akiyama, K.T. Valsaraj, and D.M. Wetzel, Industrial, and Engineering Chemistry Research, 35, 3597 (1996).
- "Multicycle Performance of the CO_{2} Acceptor in a Single-Step Process for H2 Production," with C. Han, Separation Science and Technology, 32, 681, 1997.
- "Elemental Sulfur Production During the Regeneration of Iron Oxide High-Temperature Desulfurization Sorbent," with J. White and F.R. Groves, accepted for publication in Catalysis Today (special issue devoted to environmental reaction engineering).
- "Capture of carbon dioxide from flue gas using solid regenerable sorbents" with David A. Green, Brian S. Turk, Raghubir P. Gupta, Jeffery W. Porter, and William J. McMichael, International Journal of Environmental Technology and Management 2004 – Vol. 4, No.1/2 pp. 53 – 67.
- "Electrosynthesis of Nanocrystalline Ceria-Zirconia" with A. Mukherjee, and E. J. Podlaha, Electrochem. Solid-State Lett., Volume 4, Issue 9, pp. D5-D7 (September 2001).

== See also ==
- Flue Gas Desulfurization
- Chemical Engineering
- Sorbents
- Syngas
