= Geek Rhythms =

Studio album by Rajeev Bajaj
- Released: October 10, 2004
- Genre: Hip hop
- Length: 31:00

Geek Rhythms is a rap music album conceived and funded by chemical engineer Rajeev Bajaj in 2004. Originally it was self-published, but is currently distributed by Hapi Skratch Entertainment of Loveland, Colorado and available on amazon.com. It features lyrics extolling the engineering profession, like "I am an engineer/Respect my mind/So bow down when u see me down town", and engineering concepts like thermodynamic cycles, fluid mechanics and robotics. Sales have been modest, many of them to educators who want to promote science and engineering. It has been listed in a database for STEM education.
