= Lois Aileen Bey =

American chemical engineer (born 1929)

Lois Bey
- Born: May 8, 1929 (age 97)
- Education: Illinois Institute of Technology
- Occupation: Chemical engineer
- Known for: First woman to graduate in chemical engineering at Illinois Institute of Technology

Lois Aileen Bey (born May 8, 1929) is an American chemical engineer who was the first woman to graduate from the chemical engineering program at Illinois Institute of Technology (IIT). She was also the first woman engineer hired by Underwriters Laboratory. During this time it was unusual to be a woman engineer and those who worked in the field encountered sexism and other obstacles.

== Early life ==
Bey did not come from an engineering background, though she believes that she inherited her unusually good long-term memory from her father. Neither of Bey's parents attended college. Bey experienced sexism since the day she was born; her mother made it clear to her that she had wanted a boy, in case the health problems in Lois Bey's older brother Roy prevented him from growing to adulthood.

Bey's parents had traditional gender roles. At the age of twenty-one, Bey's mother set out to marry to avoid becoming a spinster. She composed a list of qualifications that she required in a husband, which included the ability to entertain. Bey's father Leroy Karl Bey was a pianist for Sophie Tucker and Ethel Merman at the time. Her mother persuaded him to propose within six months.

During the Depression, Bey experienced more sexism when a black neighbor named Hemmie offered childcare services to her mother. She allowed Hemmie to take Lois but not her brother Roy because "I wouldn’t trust my son to strangers." Despite the sexism, Bey enjoyed her time with the other neighborhood children because she could gain experiences that were not available at her home: books, parks, and zoos.

== Education ==
A kindergarten teacher found Bey, at the age of four years, after her mother accidentally forgot her to assign someone to find her, in favor of her brother. The teacher found her unusually articulate and enrolled her in kindergarten a year early. She was very inquisitive and an avid reader, as a child, often asking questions about how things work. They moved to Chicago that year, so she had to take kindergarten again.

Bey skipped another year in grammar school, so she graduated high school one month after she turned seventeen. She chose to attend Illinois Institute of Technology because the school had the most convenient location with the cheapest tuition.

=== Sexism in Engineering ===
Bey took IIT's entrance exam for engineering, despite her mother's warnings. She later reflected that "I was a stubborn child and ignored what she told me." She was the only girl in a group of eleven high school graduates to take the exam. The other ten boys found out that they had failed, but they all knew that one fellow had been accepted into the scholarship. IIT had not sent her her score because of a "Clerical error”. Later, she learned that "... IIT was not going to give scholarship money to a woman who selected engineering because they knew she would never finish engineering, and she was only probably going to school to find a husband." By the time the IIT accepted her, she did not have the money to attend.

=== History of IIT's Chemical Engineering Department ===
In 1901, the College of Engineering at IIT officially established a Department of Chemical and Environmental Engineering. This department at IIT is one of the oldest chemical engineering programs in the United States. Charles W. Pierce earned one of the program's first chemical engineering degrees. He was one of the first African American chemical engineers in the nation. Forty-nine years later, Bey became the first woman to graduate from their chemical engineering program.

== Career ==
"I just hope that today’s young ladies don’t face the discrimination I faced before college, during college and after college."
– Lois Bey

Bey faced much discrimination as a female engineer. Many companies showed resistance to hiring a woman as an engineer. Once she was hired, she had to leave a job due to the inequitable treatment she endured from her supervisor. She faced many of the same obstacles at two other companies.

Bey began her career doing hands-on research in lab work. She gained experience with large industrial chemical equipment. Her job titles ranged from lab technician to assistant engineer.

She started her career at Edwal Laboratories, and moved on to Underwriters Laboratories and the Armour Research Institute (now IIT Research Institute). In 1956, Bey became a sales engineer for F.M. De Beers, Assoc. where she sold and troubleshooted equipment.

In 1960, Bey started working at Baxter Laboratories, during which she earned a master's degree in Library and Information Science. She combined both her degrees toward a career as an information specialist in the chemical research & development departments. In 1993, Bey retired from Stepan Chemical Company.

After retirement. She was also an active member of the American Institute of Chemical Engineers and the American Society of Information Science.

== Awards ==
In September 2001, Dr. Ahmed Zewail, 1999 Nobel Laureate in Chemistry, gave the Ralph Peck Memorial Lecture, to celebrate IIT's century of excellence in chemical engineering education and research. During this lecture, the chairman of the department, Dr. Hamid Arastoopour, presented Lois Bey with the IIT Distinguished Alumni Award. It had a memorial plaque that read: "In recognition of her pioneering role as the first female graduate in chemical engineering at IIT, her commitment, and her contribution to the chemical engineering profession."

== Societies ==
Bey is a life member of the Society of Women Engineers having joined the Society in 1953. SWE endowed the Lois Aileen Bey Memorial Scholarship in 2017, which is open to U.S. citizens entering their freshman year of undergraduate studies in chemical engineering.

She was also a member of the American Institute of Chemical Engineers and the American Society of Information Science. Patricia Brown, one of the past presidents of SWE, acknowledged Bey as a pioneer for all women engineers.
