= Raghunath Mashelkar =

Indian scientist (born 1943)

Dr. Raghunath Anant Mashelkar FTWAS FNA FASc FRS FREng FRSC
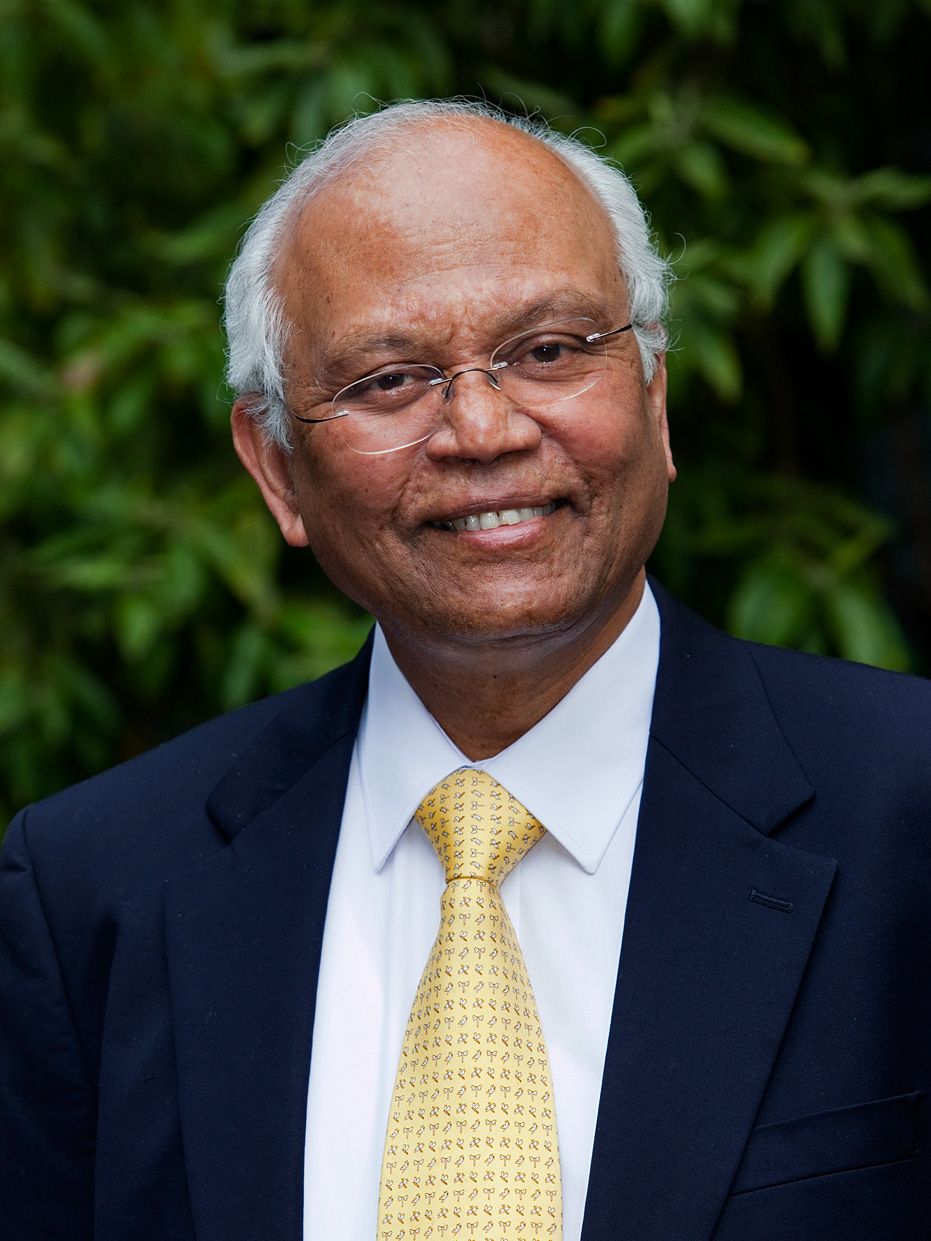
- Mashelkar in 2009
- Born: 1 January 1943 (age 83); Marcel, Goa, Portuguese India
- Other name: Ramesh Mashelkar
- Education: Institute of Chemical Technology (B.Chem Eng, PhD)
- Known for: Research & Innovation; Polymer Science&Engineering
- Title: FTWAS, FNA, FASc, FRS, FREng, FRSC
- Awards: Padma Vibhushan; Padma Bhushan; Padma Shri; Maharashtra Bhushan; Gomant Vibhushan Award; G-Files awards
- Scientific career
- Fields: Chemical Engineering
- Workplaces: CSIR; Global Research Alliance; National Innovation Foundation
- Notable students: Yogesh M. Joshi
- Website: mashelkar.com

Dr. Raghunath Anant Mashelkar (born 1 January 1943), also known as Ramesh Mashelkar, is an Indian chemical engineer who is a former Director General of the Council of Scientific and Industrial Research (CSIR). He was also the President of Indian National Science Academy, President of Institution of Chemical Engineers (UK) as also the President of Global Research Alliance. He was also first Chairperson of Academy of Scientific and Innovative Research (AcSIR). He is a Fellow of the Royal Society, Fellow of the Royal Academy of Engineering (FREng), Foreign Associate of US National Academy of Engineering and the US National Academy of Sciences.

== Early life and education ==
Raghunath Anant Mashelkar was born on 1 January 1943 in Marcel, Goa in Portuguese India. He was brought up in Bombay, British India. Mashelkar is a member of the Kalawantin community (now known as Gomantak Maratha Samaj in Goa).

He studied at University of Bombay's University Department of Chemical Technology (UDCT; now the Institute of Chemical Technology, Mumbai) where he obtained B.Chem Engg degree in chemical engineering in 1966, and PhD degree in 1969. He also served as chancellor of the institute during 2014–2024.

== Work ==
Raghunath served as the Director General of Council of Scientific and Industrial Research (CSIR) - a network of thirty-eight laboratories-for over eleven years. Prior to this, he was Director of National Chemical Laboratory (NCL) for six years.

He has been a visiting professor at Harvard University(2007–2012), at University of Delaware (1976, 1988), and at Technical University of Denmark (1982). He has been Sir Louis Matheson Distinguished Professor at Monash University for fifteen years (2007–2022).

He has been on the board of directors of several companies such as Reliance Industries Ltd, Tata Motors, Hindustan Unilever, Thermax, Piramal Group, KPIT Technologies, etc.

He has been a member of External Research Advisory Board of Microsoft (USA), Advisory Board of VTT (Finland), Corporate Innovation Board of Michelin (France), Advisory Board of National Research Foundation (Singapore), among others.

As Director of India's National Chemical Laboratory (NCL) during 1989–1995, Mashelkar gave a new orientation to NCL's research programmes with strong emphasis on globally competitive technologies and international patenting. NCL, which was involved only in import substitution research till then, began licensing its patents to multinational companies.

As Director General of CSIR, Mashelkar led the process of transformation of CSIR. The book 'World Class in India', has ranked CSIR among the top twelve organizations, who have managed the radical change the best in post-liberalised India.

The process of CSIR transformation has been heralded as one of the ten most significant achievements of Indian Science and Technology in the twentieth century, by eminent astrophysicist Prof. Jayant Narlikar, in his book, The Scientific Edge.

Mashelkar campaigned strongly with Indian academics, researchers and corporates for strengthening the IPR ecosystem. Under his leadership, CSIR occupied the first position in WIPO's top fifty PCT filler among all the developing nations in 2002. CSIR progressed in US patent filing to an extent that they reached 40% share of the US patents granted to India in 2002.

Led by Mashelkar, CSIR successfully fought the battle of revocation of the US patent on wound healing properties of turmeric (USP 5,401,5041) claiming that this was India's traditional knowledge and therefore not novel. Mashelkar also chaired the Technical Committee, which successfully challenged the US patents on Basmati Rice (USP 5,663,484) by RiceTec Company, Texas, (2001). This opened up new paradigms in the protection of traditional knowledge with WIPO bringing in a new internal patent classification system, where sub-groups on traditional knowledge were created for the first time. This led to the creation of India's Traditional Knowledge Digital Library, which helped in prevention of the grant of wrong patents on traditional knowledge.

He pioneered the concept of "Gandhian Engineering" in 2008 (Getting More from Less for More People). His paper with late C.K. Prahalad titled 'Innovation's Holy Grail' has been considered as a significant contribution to inclusive innovation. His other contributions amplify the concept of More from Less for More.

He was on the Engineering and Computer Science jury for the Infosys Prize from 2009 to 2015.

He has been a jury member of the Prestigious Queen Elizabeth Prize for Engineering since 2019.

== National contributions ==
Mashelkar was a member of the Scientific Advisory Council to the Prime Minister and also of the Scientific Advisory Committee to the Cabinet set up by successive governments. He has chaired sixteen high powered committees set up to look into diverse issues ranging from national auto fuel policy to overhauling the Indian drug regulatory system & dealing with the menace of spurious drugs. He was appointed by the Government as Assessor for the One-man Inquiry Commission investigating into the Bhopal Gas Tragedy (1985–86), and as Chairman of the committee for investigating the Maharashtra Gas Cracker Complex accident (1990–91).

Deeply connected with the innovation movement in India, Mashelkar served as the Chairman of India's National Innovation Foundation (2000–2018). He chaired Reliance Innovation Council, KPIT Technologies Innovation Council, Persistent Systems Innovation Council and Marico Foundation's Governing Council. He co-chairs the Maharashtra State Innovation Society.

== Research ==
Mashelkar has made contributions in transport phenomena, in thermodynamics of swelling, superswelling and shrinking polymers, modelling of polymerisation reactors, and engineering analysis of Non-Newtonian flows.

== Controversy ==
In 2005, the Indian government established a technical expert group on patent laws under the chairmanship of Mashelkar. Its purpose was to determine whether amendments made in Indian patent law were TRIPS compliant. The committee unanimously concluded that the amendments were not TRIPS compliant.

The report generated controversy when editorials published simultaneously in the Times of India and The Hindu alleged parts of the report had been plagiarised. Mashelkar subsequently withdrew the report due to the alleged plagiarism, admitting to flaws in the report whilst stating, "This is the first time such a thing has happened." He later also explained that the technical flaw was not the alleged lack of attribution but it was citing the attribution at the end of the report than in the body of the report due to the style adopted for the report.

The controversy was raised in the Indian Parliament, with demands that the report be "trashed" and the issues be referred to a joint standing committee. However, the government instead referred the report back to the technical expert group to reexamine and correct the inaccuracies. The report was resubmitted after corrections in March 2009 and was accepted by the Government as such.

== Awards and recognition ==
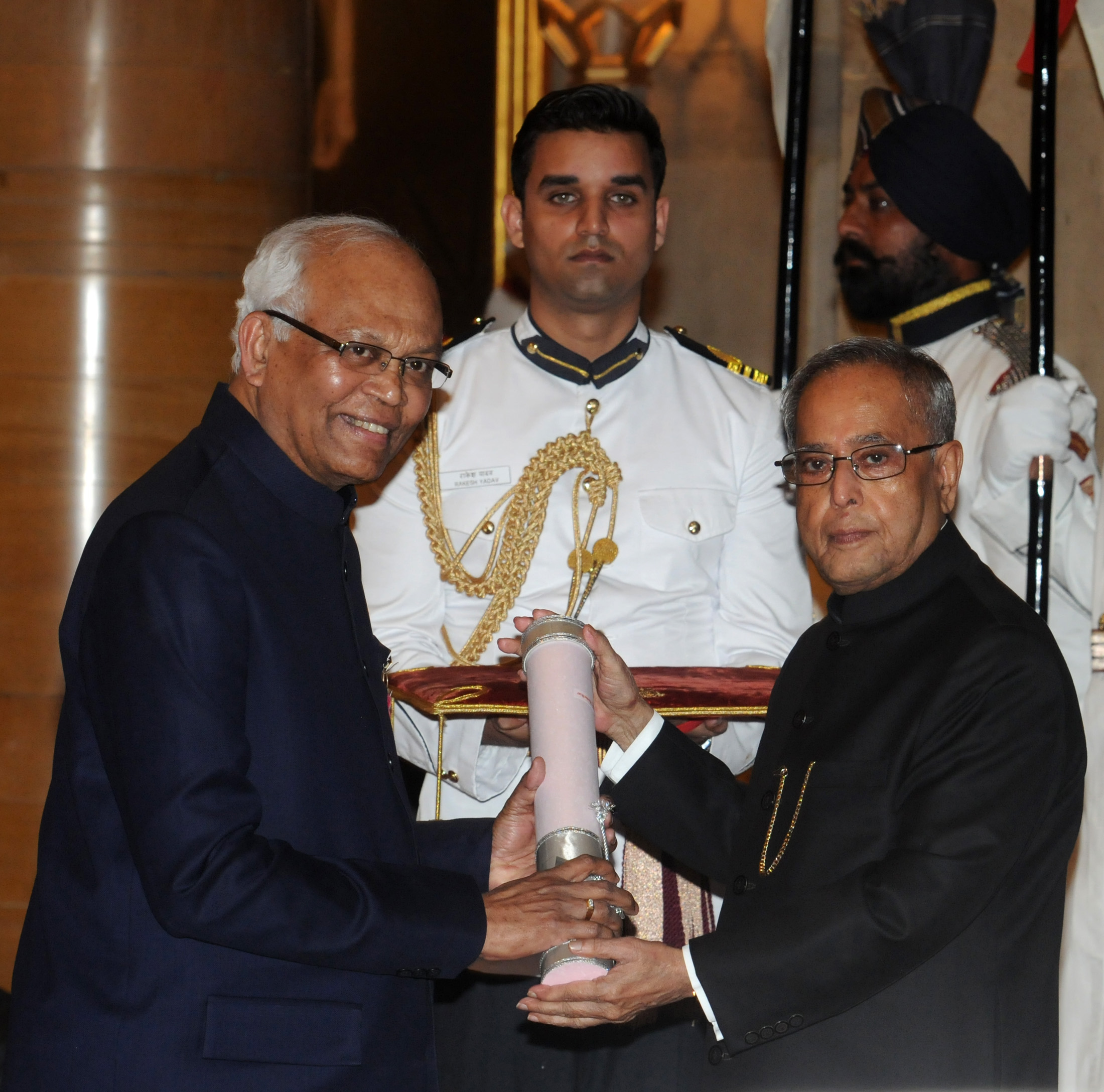
The President, Shri Pranab Mukherjee presenting the Padma Vibhushan Award to Dr. Raghunath Anant Mashelkar, at a Civil Investiture Ceremony, at Rashtrapati Bhavan, in New Delhi on March 31, 2014

Mashelkar has received several awards and is a member of numerous scientific bodies and committees. So far, 56 universities from around the world have honored him with honorary doctorates, which include Universities of London, Salford, Pretoria, Wisconsin, Swinburne, Monash, Deakin and Delhi. Academy of Grassroots Studies and Research of India (AGRASRI), Tirupati, awarded him the Rajiv Gandhi Outstanding Leadership National Award for the year 2007 on 20 August 2007 at Tirupati, by Shri R.L.Bhatia, the then Governor of Kerala. Dr. Mashelkar delivered the 6th Rajiv Gandhi Memorial Lecture on 20 August 2007 at Tirupati. He surpasses the record for the highest number of honorary doctorates awarded to any Indian engineer, which was previously held by Dr. A.P.J. Abdul Kalam with 48 honorary doctorates.

Honours by President of India: (highest Indian civilian awards)

- Padma Shri, India's fourth highest civilian award (1991)
- Padma Bhushan, India's third highest civilian award (2000)
- Padma Vibhushan, India's second highest civilian award (2014)

Election to Prestigious Academies (International):

- Fellow, The World Academy of Sciences (TWAS) (1993)
- Fellow, Royal Society (FRS), London (1998)
- Foreign Associate, National Academy of Sciences, USA (2005)
- Foreign Associate, National Academy of Engineering, USA (2003)
- Foreign Member, Royal Academy of Engineering, UK (1996)
- Foreign Fellow, American Academy of Arts & Sciences (2011)
- Corresponding Member of Australian Academy of Science (2017)
- Foreign Fellow, Australian Academy of Technological Sciences and Engineering (ATSE) (2008)
- Fellow, US National Academy of Inventors (2017)
- Fellow, World Academy of Arts & Science, USA (2000)
- Fellow, International Union of Pure & Applied Chemistry (2012)
- Fellow, The Institute of Physics, London (1998)
- Fellow, Institute of Electronics and Tele-communication Engineers (IETE) (1998)
- Fellow, Institution of Chemical Engineers, UK (1996)
- Fellow, Royal Society of Chemistry, Cambridge, UK (2006)

Election to Prestigious Academies (National):

- Fellow, Indian National Science Academy (1984)
- Fellow, Indian Academy of Sciences (1983)
- Fellow, Maharashtra Academy of Sciences (1985)
- Fellow, Indian National Academy of Engineering (1987)
- Fellow, The National Academy of Sciences, India (1989)
- Fellow, Indian Institute of Chemical Engineers (1992)
- Fellow, Indian Association for the Cultivation of Science, Kolkata (2005)

Presidency of Top Academic Bodies

- Chairperon, Academy of Scientific and Innovative Research (AcSIR) (2013)
- President, Indian National Science Academy (2005–2007)
- President, Institution of Chemicals Engineers, UK (2007–08)
- General President, Indian Science Congress (1999–2000)
- President, Materials Research Society of India (2004–06)
- President, Physical Sciences, National Academy of Sciences (1991)
- President, Maharashtra Academy of Sciences (1991–94)
- President, Society for Polymer Science in India (1986–92)
- President, Indian Society of Rheology (1986–93)
- Vice-president, Materials Research Society of India (1993–95)
- Vice-president, Indian Academy of Sciences (1995–2000)

Awards and Honours: International

- He won the TWAS Lenovo Science Prize, which is the highest honour given by The World Academy of Sciences.
- The TWAS medal (2005) by The World Academy of Sciences
- World Federation of Engineering Organisations (WFEO) Medal of Engineering Excellence (2003) by WFEO, Paris
- Star of Asia Award (2005) of Business Week (USA) at the hands of George Bush (Sr), Former President of USA
- Wolff-Ramanujam Medal Lecture, French Academy of Science, Paris (2007).
- ETH Presidential Lecture (2007), Zurich.
- Inaugural BP Innovation Oration, Judge Business School, University of Cambridge (2010).
- IIFA Ben Gurion Award, Israel (2009) for contributions in Science & Technology
- Asian Development Bank Eminent Speaker Forum Oration, Manila (2014)
- P.V. Danckwerts Memorial Lecture, IChemE, London (1994)

== Social service ==
Mashelkar established the Anjani Mashelkar Foundation in 2011 to encourage inclusive innovation which includes the excluded by deploying disruptive high technology, scalable products and services often through breakthrough business models.

The foundation has awarded the Anjani Mashelkar Prize to the best innovators of the country with a motive to recognise and reward such innovators who develop high technology solutions for the excluded members of society. As on 2024, the annual Anjani Mashelkar Prize has been awarded 14 times.
