= Rutherford Aris bibliography =

This bibliography of Rutherford Aris contains a comprehensive listing of the scientific publications of Aris, including books, journal articles, and contributions to other published material.

== Books ==
- Aris, Rutherford (1961). The optimal design of chemical reactors: a study in dynamic programming. Academic Press.
- Aris, Rutherford (1962). Vectors, tensors, and the basic equations of fluid mechanics. Prentice–Hall.
- Aris, Rutherford (1989). Vectors, tensors, and the basic equations of fluid mechanics. Dover (reprint).
- Aris, Rutherford (1964). Discrete dynamic programming: an introduction to the optimization of staged processes. Blaisdell.
- Aris, Rutherford (1965). Introduction to the analysis of chemical reactors. Prentice–Hall.
- Aris, Rutherford (1965). Dynamic programming. Socony Mobil Oil Co.
- Aris, Rutherford (1965). Elementary chemical reactor analysis. Prentice–Hall.
- Aris, Rutherford (1989). Elementary chemical reactor analysis. Dover (reprint).
- Aris, Rutherford; Amundson, N. R. (1972). First-Order Partial Differential Equations with Applications. Prentice–Hall.
- Aris, Rutherford (1978). Mathematical Modeling Techniques. Pitman.
- Aris, Rutherford (1994). Mathematical Modeling Techniques. Dover (reprint).
- Aris, Rutherford (1982). Chemical Engineering in the University Context: Four Lectures in Honor of Olaf Hougen Given in the Department of Chemical Engineering, University of Wisconsin–Madison, 1979. Board of Regents of the University of Wisconsin System.
- Aris, Rutherford (1982). An Index of Scripts in E.A. Lowe's 'Codices Latini Antiquores,' Pts. I–XI and Supplement. Otto Zeller Verlag.
- Aris, Rutherford; Rhee, H.-K.; Amundson, N.R. (1986). First Order Partial Differential Equations, Vol. 1: Theory and Application of Single Equations. Prentice-Hall.
- Aris, Rutherford; Rhee, H.-K.; Amundson, N.R. (1988). First Order Partial Differential Equations, Vol. 2: Theory and Application of Hyperbolic Systems of Quasilinear Equations. Prentice–Hall.
- Aris, Rutherford (1990). Explicatio Formarum Litterarum (The Unfolding of Letterforms from the First Century to the Fifteenth). Calligraphy Connection.
- Aris, Rutherford (1999). Mathematical Modeling: A Chemical Engineer's Perspective. Academic Press.
- Aris, Rutherford (1975). The Mathematical Theory of Diffusion and Reaction in Permeable Catalysts: The Theory of the Steady State. Oxford University Press.

== Edited books ==
- Amundson, Neal R. (1980). Aris, Rutherford; Varma, A. (eds.). The Mathematical Understanding of Chemical Engineering Systems – Selected Papers of Neal R. Amundson. Pergamon Press.
- Aris, Rutherford; Davis, H.T.; Stuewer, R.H., eds. (1983). Springs of Scientific Creativity: Essays on Founders of Modern Science. University of Minnesota Press.
- Aris, Rutherford; Aronson, D.G.; Swinney, H.S., eds. (1991). Patterns and Dynamics in Reactive Media. Springer-Verlag.

== Chapters in books ==
- "Stirred pots and empty tubes" (with A. Varma). In (N.R. Amundson and L. Lapidus, eds.). Chemical Reactor Theory. Englewood Cliffs, NJ: Prentice-Hall, 1977 (pp. 79–155).
- "Reactor Steady-State Multiplicity and Stability" (with A. Varma and M. Morbidelli). In (J.J. Carberry and A. Varma, eds.). Chemical Reactor and Reaction Engineering. New York: Marcel Dekker, 1987 (Ch. 15).

== Journal articles ==
- "On the application of Angstrom's method of measuring thermal conductivity" (with C.H. Bosanquet) Br. J. Appl. Phys. 5, 252–255 (1954).
- "On the dispersion of a solute in a fluid flowing through a tube" Proc. Roy. Soc, A235, 67–77 (1956).
- "On shape factors for irregular particles–I: The steady state problem. Diffusion and reaction." Chem. Eng. Sci. 6, 262–268 (1957). Reprinted in "Classic papers from Chemical Engineering Science." Chem. Eng. Sci. 50, 3897–3903 (1995).
- "On shape factors for irregular particles–II: The transient problem. Heat transfer to a packed bed." Chem. Eng. Sci. 7, 8–14 (1957).
- "Some remarks on longitudinal mixing or diffusion in fixed beds" (with N.R. Amundson). AIChE Journal 3, 280–282 (1957).
- "Stability of some chemical systems under control" (with N.R. Amundson). Chem. Eng. Prog. 53, 227–230 (1957).
- "An analysis of chemical reactor stability and control, parts I–III" (with N.R. Amundson). Chem. Eng. Sci. 7, 121–155 (1958).
- "On the dispersion of linear kinematic waves." Proc. Roy. Soc. A245, 268–277 (1958).
- "Statistical analysis of a reactor: Linear theory" (with N.R. Amundson). Chem. Eng. Sci. 9, 250–262 (1958).
- "Diffusion and reaction in flow system of Turner's structures." Chem. Eng. Sci. 10, 80–87 (1959).
- "On the dispersion of a solute by diffusion, convection and exchange between phases." Proc. Roy. Soc. A252, 538–550 (1959).
- "Notes on the diffusion-type model for longitudinal mixing in flow (Levenspiel, Smith and Van der Laan)." Chem. Eng. Sci. 10, 266–267 (1959).
- "The longitudinal diffusion coefficient in flow through a tube with stagnant pockets." Chem. Eng. Sci. 11, 194–198 (1959).
- "An analysis of chemical reactor stability and control–IV: Mixed derivative and proportional control." (with D.J. Nemanic, J.W. Tiemey, and N. R. Amundson). Chem. Eng. Sci. 11, 199–206 (1959).
- "Some optimization problems in chemical engineering" (with R. Bellman and R. Kalaba). Chem. Eng. Symp. Ser. 56, 95–100 (1960).
- "On optimum cross-current extraction" (with D.F. Rudd and N.R. Amundson). Chem. Eng. Sci. 12, 88–97 (1959).
- "On Denbigh's optimum temperature sequence." Chem. Eng. Sci. 12, 56–64 (1960).
- "Studies in optimization–I: The optimum design of adiabatic reactors with several beds." Chem. Eng. ScL, 12, 243–252 (1960).
- "Studies in optimization–II: Optimum temperature gradients in tubular reactors." Chem. Eng. Sci. 13, 18–29 (1960).
- "Studies in optimization–Ill: The optimum operating conditions in sequences of stirred tank reactors." Chem. Eng. Sci. 13, 75–81 (1960).
- "The optimal design of stagewise adiabatic reactors." Paper presented at the AIChE/ORSA Symposium on Optimization in Chemical Engineering, New York, 1960.
- "On the dispersion of a solute in pulsating flow through a tube." Proc. Roy. Soc. A259, 370–376 (1960).
- "Chemical reactor design: For homogeneous flow reactions, a digital computer can determine the optimum combination of reactor type and operating conditions" (with G.T. Westbrook). Ind. Eng. Chem. 53, 181–186 (1961).
- "Studies in optimization–IV: The optimum conditions for a single reaction." Chem. Eng. Sci. 13, 197–206 (1961).
- "The determination of optimum operating conditions by the methods of dynamic programming." Z. Elektrochem. 65, 229–244 (1961).
- "Tubular reactor sensitivity" (with J. Coste and N.R. Amundson). A.I.Ch.E.J. 7, 124–128 (1961).
- "A study of iterative optimization" (with D. F. Rudd and N.R. Amundson) A.I.Ch.E.J. 7, 376–384 (1961).
- "Optimal bypass rates for sequences of stirred tank reactors" Can. J. Chem. Eng. 39, 121–126 (1961).
- "Heat transfer in fluidised and moving beds" (with N. R. Amundson). Paper presented at the Proceedings of the Symposium on the Interaction between Fluids and Particles, London, 20–22 June 1962.
- "Studies in optimization–V: The bang-bang control of a batch reactor" (with N. Blakemore). Chem. Eng. Sci. 17, 591–598 (1962).
- "On optimal adiabatic reactors of combined types." Can. J. Chem. Eng. 40, 87–92 (1962).
- "Adaptive control" Br. Chem. Eng. 7, 896–900 (1962).
- "Stability of nonadiabatic packed bed reactors" (with S.L. Liu and N.R. Amundson). Ind. Eng. Chem. Fund. 2, 12–20 (1963).
- "Independence of chemical reactions" (with H. S. Mah). Ind. Eng. Chem. Fund. 2, 90–94 (1963).
- "Optimal adiabatic bed reactors for sulfur dioxide with cold shot cooling" (with K.-Y. Lee). Ind. Eng. Chem. Proc. Des.–Dev. 2, 300–306 (1963).
- "Control of a cold shot adiabatic bed reactor with a decaying catalyst" (with K.-Y. Lee). Ind. Eng. Chem. Proc. Des.–Dev. 2, 306–309 (1963).
- "Dynamic programming in countercurrent systems" (with D. Yesberg). /. Math. Anal. Appl. 7, 421–424 (1963).
- "Review of progress in control engineering." Br. Chem. Eng. 8, 432–441 (1963).
- "The fundamental arbitrariness in stoichiometry." Chem. Eng. Sci. 18, 554–555 (1963).
- "The algebra of systems of second-order reactions." Ind. Eng. Chem. Fund. 3, 28–37 (1964).
- "An analysis of chemical reactor stability and control–VIII: The direct method of Lyapunov. Introduction and applications to simple reactions in stirred vessels" (with R.B. Warden and N.R. Amundson). Chem. Eng. ScL 19, 149–172 (1963).
- "An analysis of chemical reactor stability and control–IX: Further investigations into the direct method of Lyapunov" (with R.B. Warden and N.R. Amundson). Chem. Eng. Sci. 19, 173–190 (1964).
- "Studies in optimization–VI: The application of Pontryagin's method to the control of a stirred reactor" (with CD. Siebenthal). Chem. Eng. Sci. 19, 729–746 (1964).
- "Studies in optimization–VII: The application of Pontryagin's methods to the control of batch and tubular reactors" (with CD. Siebenthal). Chem. Eng. Sci. 19, 747–761 (1964).
- "An adaptive control of the batch reactor–I: Identification of kinetics" (with H.H.-Y. Chien). Automatica 2, 41–58 (1964).
- "The adaptive control of a batch reactor–II: Optimal path control" (with H.H.-Y. Chien). Automatica 2, 59–71 (1964).
- "Optimization of multistage cyclic and branching systems by serial procedures" (with G.L. Nemhauser and D.J. Wilde). A.I.Ch.E.J. 10, 913–919 (1964).
- "N-segment least-squares approximation" (with M.M. Denn). A.I.A.A.J. 8, 432 (1964).
- "Optimal policies for first-order consecutive reversible reactions" (with R. S. H. Mah). Chem. Eng. Sci. 19, 541–553 (1964).
- "Chemical reactor analysis: A morphological approach." Ind. Eng. Chem. 56, 23–27 (1964).
- "An elementary derivation of the maximum principle" (with M. M. Denn). A.I.Ch.E.J. 11, 367–368 (1965).
- "The dynamics of reactors of mixed type: I. The nature of the steady state" (with CE. Gall). Can. J. Chem. Eng. 43, 16–22 (1965).
- "A normalization for the Thiele modulus (letter with correction in November issue)." Ind. Eng. Chem. Fund. 4, 227–229 (1965).
- "Stability estimates for the stirred tank reactor" (with W. Regenass). Chem. Eng. ScL 20, 60–66 (1964).
- "Second order variational equations and the strong maximum principle" (with M.M. Denn). Chem. Eng, Scu 20, 373–384 (1965).
- "Generalized Euler equations" (with M.M. Denn). ZAMP 16, 290–295 (1965).
- "Green's functions and optimal systems: Necessary conditions and an iterative technique" (with M.M. Denn). Ind. Eng. Chem. Fund. 4, 7–16 (1965).
- "Green's functions and optimal systems: The gradient direction in decision space" (with M.M. Denn). Ind. Eng. Chem. Fund. 4, 213–222 (1965).
- "Green's functions and optimal systems: Complex interconnected structures" (with M.M. Denn). Ind. Eng. Chem. Fund. 4, 248–257 (1965).
- "Prolegomena to the rational analysis of systems of chemical reactions." Arch. Ration. Mech. Anal. 19, 81–99 (1965).
- "An adaptive control of the batch racton–III: Simplified parameter estimation" (with W.H. Ray). Automatica 3, 53–71 (1965).
- "On simple exchange waves in fixed beds" (with N.R. Amundson and R. Swanson). Proc. Roy. Sac. A286, 129–139 (1965).
- "On the theory of reactions in continuous mixtures" (with G.R. Gavalas). Phil. Trans. Roy. Soc. A 260, 351–393 (1966).
- "Is sophistication really necessary? Ind. Eng. Chem. 58, 32–37 (1966).
- "Rationale for optimal reactor design, (with W.H. Ray). Ind. Eng. Chem. Fund. 5, 478–483 (1966).
- "Questing control of chemical reactors." Paper presented at the Annual Meeting of the American Institute of Chemical Engineers, Mexico City, October 1966.
- "Bacterial growth as an optimal process" (with C.H. Swanson, A.G. Fredrickson, and H.M. Tsuchiya). /. Theor. Biol. 12, 228–250 (1966).
- "Compartmental analysis and the theory of residence time distributions." In K.B. Warren, (ed.,). Intracellular Transport, (pp. 167–197). New York: Academic Press, 1966.
- "Studies in optimization–VIII: Questing control of a stirred tank reactor" (with R.N. Schindler). Chem. Eng. Sci. 22, 319–336 (1967).
- "Studies in optimization–IX.: The questing control of a two phase reactor" (with R.N. Schindler). Chem. Eng. Scu 11, 337–344 (1967).
- "Studies in optimization–X: Questing control with an economic criterion" (with R.N. Schindler). Chem. Eng. Sci. 11, 345–352 (1967).
- "An adaptive control of the batch reactor–IV: A more sophisticated controller" (with W.H. Ray). Automatica 4, 139–161 (1967).
- "Simple control policies for reactors with catalyst decay" (with A. Chou and W.H. Ray). Trans. Insm Chem. Engrs. 45, 153–159 (1967).
- "On the mathematical status of the pseudosteady state hypothesis of biochemical kinetics" (with F.G. Heineken and H.M. Tsuchiya). Math. Biosci. 1, 95–113 (1967).
- "Transition between regimes in gas-solid reactions." Ind. Eng. Chem. Fund. 6, 315–318 (1967).
- "On the accuracy of determining rate constants in enzymatic reactions" (with F.G. Heineken and H.M. Tsuchiya). Math. Biosci. 1, 115–141 (1967).
- "Prolegomena to the rational analysis of systems of chemical reactions–II: Some addenda. Arch. Ration. Mech. Anal. 11, 356–364 (1968).
- "On what sort of place, if any, theoretical and mathematical studies should have in graduate chemical engineering research." Chem. Eng. Educ. 1, 36–39 (1967).
- "Sufficient conditions for the uniqueness of the steady state." Chem. Eng. ScL 23, 1501 (1968).
- "Optimal control for pyrolytic reactors" (with A.P. Jackman). Paper presented at the Fourth European Symposium, Brussels, 1968.
- "Canon and method in the arts and sciences (Olin Lecture, Yale University)." Chem. Eng. Educ. 3, 48–52 (1969).
- "On stability criteria of chemical reaction engineering." Chem. Eng. Sci 14, 149–169 (1968).
- "A note on mechanism and memory in the kinetics of biochemical reactions." Math. Biosci 3, 421–429 (1968).
- "Communications on the theory of diffusion and reaction–I: A complete parametric study of the first-order, irreversible exothermic reaction in a flat slab of catalyst" (with D.W. Drott). Chem. Eng. Sci. 24, 541–551 (1969).
- "Communications on the theory of diffusion and reaction–II: The effect of shape on the effectiveness factor" (with S. Rester). Chem. Eng. Sci. 24, 793–795 (1969).
- "Communications on the theory of diffusion and reaction–Ill: The simulation of shape effects" (with S. Rester and J. Jouven). Chem. Eng. Sci. 24, 1019–1022 (1968).
- "Communications on the theory on diffusion and reaction–IV: Combined effects of internal and external diffusion in the non-isothermal case" (with B. Hatfield). Chem. Eng. Sci. 24, 1213–1222 (1969).
- "Mathematical aspects of chemical reaction" Ind. Eng. Chem. 61, 17–29 (1969).
- "Some problems in chemical reactor analysis with stochastic features: Linear systems with fluctuating coefficients" (with T.M. Pell, Jr.). Ind. Eng. Chem. Fund. 8, 339–345 (1969).
- "A remark on the equilibrium theory of the parametric pump." Ind. Eng. Chem. Fund. 8, 603 (1969).
- "Problems in chemical reactor analysis with stochastic features: Control of linearized distributed systems on discrete and corrupted observations" (with T.M. Pell, Jr.). Ind. Eng Chem. Fund. 9, 15–20 (1970).
- "Chemical kinetics and the ecology of mathematics," Am. Scient. 58, 419–428 (1970).
- "Conmiunications on the theory of diffusion and reaction–V: Findings and conjectures concerning the multiplicity of solutions." (with I. Copelowitz). Chem. Eng. Sci. 25, 906–909 (1970).
- "Communications on the theory of diffusion and reaction–VI: The effectiveness of spherical catalyst particles in steep external gradients" (with I. Copelowitz). Chem. Eng. Sci. 25, 885–896 (1970).
- "Studies in optimization–XI: An experimental test of questing controller" (with J.M. Wheeler). Chem. Eng. Sci. 25, 445–462 (1970).
- "On the theory of multicomponent chromatography" (with H.-K. Rhee and N.R. Amundson). Phil. Trans. Roy. Soc. A 267, 419–455 (1970).
- "Algebraic aspects of formal chemical kinetics." In M. Bunge (ed.). Studies in the Foundations, Methodology and Philosophy of Science, (Vol. 4, pp. 119–129). New York: Springer-Verlag, 1971.
- "Multicomponent adsorption in continuous countercurrent exchangers" (with H.-K. Rhee and N.R. Amundson). Phil. Trans. Roy. Soc. A 269, 187–215 (1971).
- "A note on a form of the Emden–Fowler Equation" (with B.N. Mehta). /. Math. Anal. Appl. 36, 611–621 (1971).
- "A note on the structure of the transient behavior of chemical reactors." Chem. Eng. J. 2, 140–141 (1970).
- "Communications on the theory of diffusion and reaction–VII: The isothermal pth order reaction" (with B.N. Mehta). Chem. Eng. Sci. 26, 1699–1712 (1971).
- "Transients in distributed chemical reactors part 1: A simplified model" (with D.L. Schruben). Chem. Eng. J. 2, 179–188 (1970).
- "Surface diffusion and reaction at widely separated sites" /. Catal. 22, 282–284 (1971).
- "Variational bounds for problems in diffusion and reaction" (with W. Strieder). /. Inst. Maths Appl. 8, 328–334 (1971).
- "On the realistic and interesting parameter ranges in the theory of diffusion and reaction" (with M.C. Mercer). Latin Am. J. Chem. Eng. Appl. Chem. 2, 149–162 (1971).
- Some problems in the analysis of transient behavior and stability of chemical reactors. First International Symposium on Chemical Reaction Engineering no. 109. Washington, D.C.: American Chemical Society, 1972.
- "Communications on the theory of diffusion and reaction–VIII: Variational bounds on the effectiveness factor" (with S. Rester). Chem. Eng. Sci. 27, 347–360 (1972).
- "On a mechanism for autocatalysis" (with D.R. Schneider and N.R. Amundson). Chem. Eng. Sci. 27, 895–905 (1972).
- "Mobility, permeability, and the pseudosteady-state hypothesis." Math. BioscL 13, 1–8 (1972).
- "Diffusive and electrostatic effects with insolubilized enzymes" (with M.L. Schuler and H.M. Tsuchiya). /. Theor. Biol. 35, 67–76 (1972).
- "A method of representing the nonisothermal effectiveness factor for fixed bed calculations" (with J.G. Jouven). A.I.Ch.E.J. 18, 402–408 (1972).
- "The control of a stirred tank reactor with hysteresis in the control element–I: Phase space analysis" (with J.C. Hyun). Chem. Eng. Sci. 27, 1341–1359 (1972).
- "The control of a stirred tank reactor with hysteresis in the control element–II: Describing function analysis" (with J.C. Hyun). Chem. Eng. Sci. 27, 1361–1370 (1972).
- "On the equations for the movement and deformation of a reaction front" (with R.H. Knapp). Arch. Ration. Mech. Anal. 44, 165–177 (1972).
- "Some problems common to chemical engineering and the biological sciences." Paper presented at the Proceedings of the Scandinavian Congress of Chemical Engineering, November 1971.
- "Some interactions between problems in chemical engineering and the biological sciences" In G. Lindner and K. Nyberg (eds.). Environmental Engineering, (pp. 215–225). Dordrecht-Holland: D. Reidel Publishing Co., 1973.
- "Transients in distributed chemical reactors. Part 2: Influence of diffusion in the simplified model" (with I.H. Farina). Chem. Eng. J. 4, 149–170 (1972).
- "Asymmetries generated by diffusion and reaction, and their bearing on active transport through membranes" (with K.H. Keller). Proc. Natl. Acad Sci. USA 69, 777–779 (1972).
- "An analysis of chemical reactor stability and sensitivity–XIV: The effect of the steady state hypothesis" (with D.R. Schneider and N.R. Amundson). Chem. Eng, ScL 28, 885–896 (1973).
- "Hydrodynamic focusing and electronic cell-sizing techniques" (with M.L. Shuler and H.M. Tsuchiya). Appl. Microbiol. 24, 384–388 (1972).
- "Diffusive and electrostatic effects with insolubilized enzymes subject to substrate inhibition" (with M.L. Shuler and H.M. Tsuchiya). /. Theor. Biol. 41, 347–356 (1973).
- "Communications on the theory of diffusion and reaction–IX: Internal pressure and forced flow for reactions with volume change" (with J.P.G. Kehoe). Chem. Eng. ScL 28, 2094 – 2098 (1973).
- "Communications on the theory of diffusion and reaction–X. A generalization of Wei's bounds on the maximum temperature" (with C. Georgakis). Chem. Eng. Sci. 29, 291–293 (1974).
- "The theory of diffusion and reaction: A chemical engineering symphony (1973 ASEE Award lecture)." Chem. Eng. Educ. 8, 20–40 (1973).
- Counter-current moving bed chromatographic reactors (with S. Viswanathan). ACS Symposium Series no. 133. Washington, D.C.: American Chemical Society, 1974.
- "An analysis of the countercurrent moving bed reactor" (with S. Viswanathan). SIAM–AMS Proc. 8, 99–124 (1974).
- "Phenomena of multiplicity, stability, and symmetry." Ann. NY Acad. Sci. 231, 86–98 (1974).
- "On the ostensible steady state of a dynamical system." Rend. Lincei Ser. W//57, 1–9 (1974).
- "What's the use of a Ph.D. anyway?" AIChE Stud. Memb. Bull. 15, 5–7 (1974).
- "On the concept of the steady state in chemical reactor analysis" (with S. Viswanathan). Chem. Eng. Commun. 2, 1–4 (1975).
- "The design of stirred reactors with hollow fiber catalysts for Michaelis–Menten kinetics" (with C. Georgakis and P.C.-H. Chan). Biotechnol. Bioeng. 57, 99–106 (1975).
- "Diffusion, reaction and the pseudo-steady-state hypothesis" (with C. Georgakis). Math. Biosci. 25, 237–258 (1975).
- "Diffusion and first order reaction in a general multilayered membrane" (with B. Bunow). Math. Biosci. 26, 157–174 (1975).
- "Carberry's ultimate paper." Chem. Eng. Educ. 9, 118–119 (1975).
- "Diffusion and reaction in mycelial pellets." J. Ferment. Technol. 53, 899–901 (1975).
- "Some thoughts on the nature of academic research in chemical engineering." Chem. Eng. Educ. 10, 2–5 (1976).
- "Computational methods for the tubular chemical reactor" (with A. Varma, C. Georgakis, and N.R. Amundson). Comput. Meth. Appl. Mech. Eng. 8, 319–330 (1976).
- "How to get the most out of an equation without really trying." Chem. Eng. Educ. 10, 114–124 (1976).
- "Geometric correction factors for the Weisz diffusivity cell" (with W.W. Meyer and L.L. Hegedus). /. Catal. 42, 135–138 (1976).
- "Modeling the monolith: Some methodological considerations" (with S.T. Lee). Paper presented at the Fourth International-Sixth European Symposium on Chemical Reaction Engineering, Heidelberg, 6–8 April 1976.
- "Studies in the control of tubular reactors–I: General considerations" (with C. Georgakis and N.R. Amundson). Chem. Eng. ScL 32, 1359–1369 (1977).
- "Studies in the control of tubular reactors–II: Stabilization by modal control" (with C. Georgakis and N.R. Amundson). Chem. Eng. ScL 32, 1371 – 1379 (1977).
- "Studies in the control of tubular reactors–III: Stabilization by observer design" (with C. Georgakis and N.R. Amundson). Chem. Eng. Sci. 32, 1381–1387 (1977).
- "Academic chemical engineering in an historical perspective." Ind. Eng. Chem. Fund. 16, 1–5 (1977).
- "The sciences and the humanities" (with M. Penn). Chem. Eng. Educ. 11, 68–73, 85 (1977).
- "Dynamics of a chemostat in which two organisms compete for a common substrate" (with A.E. Humphrey). Biotechnol Bioeng. 19.1375–1386 (1977).
- "Re, k and ir. A conversation on some aspects of mathematical modelling." Appl Math. Modelling 1, 386–394 (1977).
- "Art and craft in the modelling of chemical processes." Paper presented at the Proceedings of the First International Conference on Mathematics Modelling, St. Louis, MO, 29 August–1 September 1977.
- "On the effects of radiative heat transfer in monoliths" (with S.-T. Lee). Chem. Eng. Sci. 32, 827–837 (1977).
- "The infiltration of lymphocytes and macrophages into a site of infection." In A.I. Bell, A.S. Perelson, and G.H. Pimbley (eds.). Theoretical Immunology, (Vol. 8). New York: Marcel Dekker, 1978.
- "Finite stability regions for large-scale systems with stable and unstable subsystems" (with M. Morari and G.S. Stephanopoulos). Int. J. Com. 26, 805–815 (1977).
- "Models of the catalytic monolithic." Paper presented at the Levich Conference, Oxford, 1978. 151. Poisoning in monolithic catalysts. American Chemical Society Symposium Series no. 65. Washington, D.C.: American Chemical Society, 1978.
- "An analysis of thermal desorption mass spectra. I" (with C.-M. Chan and W.H. Weinberg). Appl. Surf. Sci. 1, 360–376 (1978).
- "Temperature gradients in porous catalyst pellets." Ind. Eng. Chem. Fund. 17, 309–313 (1978).
- "Horses of other colors: Some notes on seminars in a chemical engineering department." Chem. Eng. Educ. 12, 148–151 (1978).
- "Chemical reactors and some bifurcation phenomena." Ann. NY Acad. Sci. 316, 314–331 (1979).
- "De exemplo simulacrorum continuorum discretalumque." Arch. Rat. Mech. Anal. 70, 203–209 (1979).
- "Measurement of leukocyte motility and chemotaxis parameters using a quantitative analysis of the under-agarose migration assay" (with D. Lauffenburger). Math. Biosci. 44, 121–138 (1978).
- "A stochastic analysis of the growth of competing microbial populations in a continuous biochemical reactor" (with G.S. Stephanopoulos and A.G. Frederickson). Math. Biosci. 45, 99–135 (1979).
- "Stability analysis of structured chemical engineering systems via decomposition" (with M. Morari and G.S. Stephanopoulos). Chem. Eng. Sci. 34, 11–15 (1979).
- "The role of dimensionless parameters in the Briggs–Haldane and Michaelis–Menten approximations" (with P.S. Crooke and R.D. Tanner). Chem. Eng. Sci. 34, 1354–1357 (1979).
- "Creeping fronts and traveling waves (E. Wicke festschrift)." Chem. Eng. Tech. 51, 767–771 (1979).
- "Effect of catalyst loading on the simultaneous reactions of NO, CO, and O2" (with L.L. Hegedus, R.K. Herz and S.H. Oh). /. Catal. 57, 513–515 (1979).
- "Method in the modeling of chemical engineering systems." In C.T. Leondes (ed.). Control and Dynamic Systems: Advances in Theory and Application, (Ch. 20). New York: Academic Press, 1979.
- "The growth of competing microbial populations in a CSTR with periodically varying inputs" (with G.S. Stephanopoulos and A.G. Fredrickson). A.I.Ch.E.J. 25, 863–872 (1979).
- "Traveling waves in a simple population model involving growth and death" (with C.R. Kennedy). Bull. Math. Biol. 42, 397–429 (1980).
- "Bifurcations of a model diffusion-reaction system" (with C.R. Kennedy). In P. Holmes (ed.). New Approaches to Nonlinear Problems in Dynamics (pp. 211–233). Philadelphia: SIAM, 1980.
- "A continuous chromatographic reactor" (with B.K. Cho and R.W. Carr, Jr.). Chem. Eng. Sci. 35, 74–81(1980).
- "The mere notion of a model" (with M. Penn). Math. Model. 1, 1–12 (1980).
- "Hierarchies of models in reactive systems." In W. E. Stewart, W.H. Ray, and J. Conway (eds.), Dynamics and Modelling of Reactive Systems, (pp. 1–35). New York: Academic Press, 1980.
- "A note on the Beneventan script." Soc. Scribes Ilium. Newsl. 18 (1980).
- "Bilinear approximation of general non-linear dynamic systems with linear inputs" (with S. Svoronos and G.S. Stephanopoulos). Int. J. Cont. 31, 109–126 (1980).
- "Observations on fixed-bed dispersion models: The role of the interstitial fluid" (with S. Sundaresan and N.R. Amundson). A.I.Ch.E.J. 26, 529–536 (1980).
- "A new continuous flow reactor for simultaneous reaction and separation" (with B.K. Cho and R.W. Carr). Sep. Sci. Technol. 15, 679–696 (1980).
- "Effects of random motility on growth of bacterial populations" (with D. Lauffenburger and K.H. Keller). Microb. EcoL 7, 207–227 (1981).
- "Some canonical chemical engineering catastrophes (Churchill festschrift)." Chem. Eng. Commun. 9, 51 (1981).
- "Isothermal sustained oscillations in a very simple surface reaction" (with C.G. Takoudis and L.D. Schmidt). Surf ScL 105, 325–333 (1981).
- "Multiple steady states in reaction controlled surface catalysed reactions" (with C.G. Takoudis and L.D. Schmidt). Chem. Eng. ScL 36, 377–386 (1981).
- "Steady state multiplicity in surface reactions with coverage dependent parameters" (with C.G. Takoudis and L.D. Schmidt). Chem. Eng. Sci. 36, 1795–1802 (1981).
- "The notions of uniqueness and multiplicity of steady states in the development of chemical reactor analysis." In W.F. Furler (ed.), A Century of Chemical Engineering, (pp. 389–404). New York: Plenum Press, 1982.
- "On the behaviour of two stirred tanks in series" (with S. Svoronos and G.S. Stephanopoulos). Chem. Eng. ScL 3, 357–366 (1982).
- "Weakly coupled systems of nonlinear elliptic boundary value problems" (with K. Zygourakis). Nonlin. Anal 6, 555–569 (1982).
- "The intangible tints of dawn." Thor. Quart. 1, 52–60 (1982).
- "The mathematical theory of a countercurrent catalytic reactor" (with B.K. Cho and R.W. Carr). Proc. Roy. Soc. A383, 147–189 (1982).
- "Chemical engineering at the University of Minnesota." Chem. Eng. Educ. 16, 50–54 (1982).
- Continuous reaction gas chromatography: The dehydrogenation of cyclohexane over Pt/g-AI2O3 (with A.W. Wardwell and R.W. Carr, Jr.). American Chemical Society Symposium Series no. 196. Washington, D.C.: American Chemical Society (1982).
- "Isothermal oscillations in surface reactions with coverage independent parameters" (with C.G. Takoudis and L.D. Schmidt). Chem. Eng. Sci. 37, 69–76 (1982).
- "The scope of R.T.D. theory." In A. Pethos and R.D. Noble (eds.), Residence time distribution theory in chemical engineering, (pp. 1–21). Weinheim: Verlag Chemie GmbH, 1982.
- "Residence time distribution with many reactions and in several environments." In A. Petho and R.D. Noble (eds.). Residence time distribution theory in chemical engineering, (pp. 24–40). Weinheim: Veriag Chemie GmbH, 1982.
- Review of Insights into Chemical Engineering, by P.V. Danckwerts, Chem. Eng. Sci. 37, 1123 (1982).
- "Some characteristic nonlinearities of reacting systems." In A. Bishop, D. Campbell, and B. Nicolaenko (eds.). Nonlinear Problems: Present and Future, North-Holland, Amsterdam, 1982.
- "Effects of cell motility and chemotaxis on microbial population growth" (with D. Lauffenburger and K. Keller). Biophys. J. 40, 209–219 (1982).
- "Multiple oxidation reactions and diffusion in the catalytic layer of monolith reactors" (with K. Zygourakis). Chem. Eng. Sci. 38, 733–744 (1983).
- "Monotone iteration methods for solving coupled systems of nonlinear boundary value problems" (with K. Zygourakis). Comput. Chem. Eng. 7, 183–193 (1983).
- "A two-layer model of the atmosphere indicating the effects of mixing between the surface layer and the air aloft" (with D.D. Reible and F.H. Shair). Atmos. Environ. 17, 25–33 (1983).
- "The interpretation of sorption and diffusion data in porous solids." Ind. Eng. Chem. Fund. 22, 150–151 (1983).
- "Theoretical and experimental aspects of catalyst impregnation" (with S.-Y. Lee). In G. Poncelet, P. Grange, and P.A. Jacobs (eds.), Studies in Surface Science and Catalysis, (Vol. 16; pp. 35–45). Amsterdam: Elsevier, 1983.
- "Effectiveness of catalytic archipelagos–I: Regular arrays of regular islands" (with D.-Y. Kuan and H.T. Davis). Chem. Eng. Sci. 38, 719–732 (1983).
- "Effectiveness of catalytic archipelagos–II: Random arrays of random islands" (with D.-Y. Kuan and H.T. Davis). Chem. Eng. Sci. 38, 1569–1579 (1983).
- "On the dynamics of a stirred tank with consecutive reactions" (with D.V. Jorgensen). Chem. Eng. Sci. 38, 45–53 (1983).
- Chemical reaction engineering as an intellectual discipline. American Chemical Society Symposium Series no. 226. Washington, D.C.: American Chemical Society 1983.
- "R.H. Wilhelm's influence on the development of chemical reaction engineering (from the Wilhelm lectures at Princeton)." Chem. Eng. Educ, 17, 10–41 (1983).
- "Discrete cell model of pore-mouth poisoning of fixed-bed reactors" (with B.K. Cho and L.L. Hegedus). A.I.Ch. E.J. 29, 289–297 (1983).
- "The jail of shape." Chem. Eng. Commun. 2A, 167–181 (1983).
- "The distribution of active ingredients in supported catalysts prepared by impregnation" (with S.-Y. Lee). Catal Rev. 21, 207–340 (1984).
- "Traveling bands of chemotactic bacteria in the context of population growth" (with D. Lauffenburger and C.R. Kennedy). Bull. Math. Biol. 46, 19–40 (1984).
- "Rate multiplicity and oscillations in single-species surface reactions" (with I. Kevrekidis and L.D. Schmidt). Surf. Sci. 137, 151–166 (1984).
- "Problems in the dynamics of chemical reactors." Paper presented at the International Chemical Reaction Engineering Conference, Pune, 1984.
- "Estimation of fin efficiencies of regular tubes arrayed in circumferential fins" (with D.-Y. Kuan and H.T. Davis). Int. J. Heat Mass Trans. 27, 148–151 (1984).
- "Mathematical analysis for a chromatographic reactor" (with T. Petroulas and R.W. Carr). In R. Vichnevetsky and R.S. Stepleman (eds.). Advances in Computer Methods for Partial Differential Equations–V: Proceedings of the Fifth IMACS International Symposium on Computer Methods for Partial Differential Equations, New Brunswick: IMACS, Dept. of Computer Science, Rutgers University, 1984.
- "On the dynamics of periodically forced chemical reactors" (with I.G. Kevrekidis and L.D. Schmidt). Chem. Eng. Commun. 30, 323–330 (1984).
- "More on the dynamics of a stirred tank with consecutive reactions" (with D.V. Jorgensen and W.W. Farr). Chem. Eng. Sci. 39, 1741–1752 (1984).
- "Thermodynamic limitations on the dynamic behaviour of heterogeneous reacting systems" (with I. Kevrekidis and L.D. Schmidt). Inst. Chem. Eng. Symp. Ser. 87, 109–115 (1984).
- "Analysis of the counter-current moving-bed chromatographic reactor" (with T. Petroulas and R.W. Carr). Comp. Maths. Appls. 11, 5–34 (1985).
- "Numerical computation of invariant circles of maps" (with I.G. Kevrekidis, L.D. Schmidt, and S. Pelikan). Physica 16D, 243–251 (1985).
- "On the permeability of membranes with parallel, but interconnected, pathways." Math. Biosci. (Bellman Memorial Issue) 11, 5–16 (1985).
- "Analysis and performance of a countercurrent moving-bed chromatographic reactor" (with T. Petroulas and R.W. Carr, Jr.). Chem. Eng. Set 40, 2233–2240 (1985). 235a.
- "Some common features of periodically forced reacting systems" (with I.G. Kevrekidis and L.D. Schmidt). Chem. Eng. Sci. 41, 1263–1276 (1986).
- "The stirred tank forced" (with I.G. Kevrekidis and L.D. Schmidt). Chem. Eng. Sci. 41, 1549–1560 (1986).
- "Yet who would have thought the old man to have had so much blood in him?'‚ÄîReflections on the multiplicity of steady states of the stirred tank reactor" (with W.W. Farr). Chem. Eng. Sci. 41, 1385–1402 (1986).
- "Resonance in periodically forced processes" (with I.G. Kevrekidis and L.D. Schmidt). Chem. Eng. Sci. 41, 905–911 (1986).
- "Entrainment regions for periodically forced oscillators" (with D.G. Aronson, R.P. McGehee, and I.G. Kevrekidis). Phys. Rev. A, 33, 2190–2192 (1986).
- "On a problem in hindered diffusion (Serrin festschrift)." Arch. Rat. Mech. Anal. 95, 83–91 (1986).
- "The mathematical background of chemical reactor analysis–I. Preliminaries, batch reactors."Physica D20, 82–90 (1986).
- "The mathematical background of chemical reactor analysis–II. The stirred tank reactor." In G.S.S. Ludford (ed.). Reacting Flows: Combustion and Chemical Reactors, Lectures in Applied Mathematics, (Vol. 24, pp. 75–107). Providence: American Mathematical Society, 1986.
- "The continuous countercurrent moving bed chromatographic reactor" (with B. Fish and R.W. Carr). Chem. Eng. Sci. 41, 661 (1986).
- "An analysis of the counter-current adsorber" (with D. Altshuller, G. Vazquez, and R.W. Carr). Chem. Eng. Commun. 52, 311 (1987).
- "Anisotropic membrane transport" (with K.-M. Jem and E.L. Cussler). Chem. Eng. Commun. 55, 5–17 (1987).
- "On apparent second-order kinetics" (with T.C. Ho). A.I.Ch.E.J. 33, 1050–1051 (1987).
- "A global study of Kondepudi's pitchfork" (with X.-H. Song). Sadhana 10, 1–12 (1987).
- "Degenerate Hopf bifurcations in the CSTR with reactions A → B → C" (with W.W. Farr). Can. Math. Soc. Conf. Proc. 8, 397–418 (1987).
- "A general theory of anisotropic membranes" (with E.L. Cussler) Chem. Eng. Commun. 58, 3–16 (1987).
- "Nonlinear dynamics and strange attractors" (with K.S. Chang). Kor. J. Chem. Eng. 4, 95–104 (1987).
- "A sequence of scripts." Scribe 41, 7–12 (1987).
- "Ann Hechle's 'In the Beginning.' Call. Revs 4, 41–46 (1987).
- "Painting with words: The art of Donald Jackson." Call. Revs 6, 18–28 (1987).
- "Forced oscillations of chemical reactors." In P. Gray et al. (eds.), Spatial Inhomogeneities and Transient Behaviour in Chemical Kinetics., Manchester: Manchester University Press, 1990.
- "Autonomous bifurcations of a simple bimolecular surface-reaction model" (with M.A. McKamin and L.D. Schmidt). Proc. Roy. Soc. A415, 363–387 (1988).
- "Barrier membranes" (with E.L. Cussler, S.E. Hughes, and W.J. Ward, III). /. Membrane Sci. 38, 161–174 (1988).
- "Forced oscillations of a self-oscillating bimolecular surface reaction model" (with M.A. McKamin and L.D. Schmidt). Proc. Roy. Soc. A417, 363–388 (1988).
- "Response of nonlinear oscillators to forced oscillations: Three chemical reaction case studies" (with M.A. McKamin and L.D. Schmidt). Chem. Eng. Sci. 43, 2833–2844 (1988).
- "Chaotic behaviour of two counter-currently cooled reactors" (with K.S. Chang). Lat. Am. Appl. Res. 18, 1 (1988).
- "Modelling cubic autocatalysis by successive bimolecular steps" (with P. Gray and S.K. Scott). Chem. Eng. Sci. 43, 207–211 (1988).
- "Ut Simulacrum, Poesis." New Literary Hist. 20, 323–340 (1988–1989).
- "Theories of precipitation induced by dissolution" (with J. Kopinsky and E.L. Cussler) A.I.Ch.E.J. 34, 2005–2010 (1988).
- "Effects of velocity on homogeneous-heterogeneous ignition and extinction" (with R.J. Olsen and L.D. Schmidt). Combust. Sci. Tech., 99 (1995).
- "On reactions in continuous mixtures." A.I.Ch.E.J. 35, 539–548 (1989).
- "On the limits of facilitated diffusion" (with E.L. Cussler and A. Bhown). /. Memb. Sci. 43, 149–164 (1989).
- "Continuous lumping of nonlinear chemical kinetics" (with G. Astarita). Chem. Eng. Proc. 26, 63–69 (1989).
- "On aliases of differential equations" (with G. Astanta). Rend. Lincei Ser. VIII 83, 7–ll (1989).
- "Military technology and garrison organization: Some observations on Anglo-Saxon military thinking in light of the burghal hidage" (with B.S. Bachrach). Tech. CuL 31, 1–17 (1990).
- "Forced oscillations of chemical reactors with multiple steady states" (with G.A. Cordonier and L.D. Schmidt). Chem. Eng. Sci. 45, 1659–1675 (1990).
- "The simulated countercurrent moving bed chromatographic reactor" (with A.J. Ray, A.L. Tonkovich, and R.W. Carr). Chem. Eng. Sci. 45, 2431–2437 (1990).
- "The effects of phase transitions, surface diffusions, and defects on surface catalyzed reactions: Fluctuations and oscillations" (with D.G. Vlachos and L.D. Schmidt). J. Chem. Phys. 93, 8306–8313 (1990).
- "Manners Makyth Modellers (Fifth Danckwerts Lecture)." Trans. I.Ch.E. 69, 165–174 (1991).
- "The ignition criteria for stagnation-point flow: Semenov–Frank–Kamenetski or van't Hoff' (with X¬ª Song and L.D. Schmidt). Combust. Set Tech. 75, 311–331 (1991).
- "Chemical engineering and the liberal education today." Paper presented at the 25th Phillips Lecture, Oklahoma State University, 26 April 1991.
- "Steady states and oscillations in homogeneousheterogeneous reaction systems" (with X. Song and L.D. Schmidt). Chem. Eng. ScL 46, 1203–1215 (1991).
- "Diffusion and reaction in a Mandelbrot lung." Chaos, Sol. Fract. 1, 583–593 (1991).
- "Multiple indices, simple lumps and duplicitous kinetics." In A.V. Sapre and F.J. Krambeck (eds.), Chemical Reactions in Complex Mixtures, (pp. 25–41). New York: Van Nostrand Reinhold, 1991.
- "The mathematics of continuous mixtures." In G. Astarita and S.F. Sandler (eds.). Kinetics and Thermodynamic Lumping of Multicomponent Mixtures. Elsevier, 1991.
- "The effect of phase transitions, surface diffusion, and defects on heterogeneous reactions: Multiplicities and fluctuations" (with D.G. Vlachos and L.D. Schmidt). Surface Sci. 249, 248–264 (1991).
- "Buoyancy-driven flows of a radiatively participating fluid in a vertical cylinder heated from below" (with A.G. Salinger, S. Brandon, and J.J. Derby). Proc. Roy. Soc. A442, 313–341 (1992).
- "Dynamics of homogeneous-heterogeneous reactors" (with R.J. Olsen, W.R. Williams, and L.D. Schmidt). Chem. Eng. Sci. 47 2505–2510 (1992).
- "Kinetics of facet formation during growth and etching of crystals" (with D.G. Vlachos and L.D. Schmidt). In K.S. Liang, M.P. Anderson, R.F. Bruisma, and G.G. Scoles (eds.). Interface Dynamics and Growth, (Vol. 237, pp. 145150). 1992.
- "Structures of small metal clusters–II: Phase transitions and isomerization" (with D.G. Vlachos and L.D. Schmidt). /. Chem. Phys. 96, 6891–6901 (1992).
- "Structure of small catalyst particles" (with D.G. Vlachos and L.D. Schmidt). Chem. Eng. Sci. 47, 2769–2774 (1992).
- "Structures of small metal clusters–I: Low temperature behavior" (with D.G. Vlachos and L.D. Schmidt). /. Chem. Phys. 96, 6880–6890 (1992).
- "Bifurcation and global stability in surface catalyzed reactions using the Monte Carlo method" (with D.G. Vlachos and L.D. Schmidt). In H. Swinney, R. Aris, and D. Aronson (eds.). Patterns and Dynamics in Reactive Media, (Vol. 37, pp. 187–206). New York: Springer-Verlag, 1991.
- "Spatial and temporal patterns in catalytic oscillations" (with D.G. Vlachos, F. Smith, and L.D. Schmidt). Physica A 188, 302–321 (1992).
- "Comments on mitigation of backmixing via catalyst dilution." Chem. Eng. Sci. 47, 507508 (1992).
- "Modeling the spontaneous ignition of coal stockpiles" (with A.G. Salinger and J.J. Derby). A.I.Ch.E.J. 40, 991–1004 (1993).
- "Ends and beginnings in the mathematical modelling of chemical engineering systems." Chem. Eng. ScL 48, 2507–2517 (1993).
- "Products in methane combustion near surfaces" (with D.G. Vlachos and L.D. Schmidt). A.I.Ch.E.J. 40, 1018–1025 (1994).
- "Ignition and extinction of flames near surfaces: Combustion of CH in air" (with D.G. Vlachos and L.D. Schmidt). A.I.Ch.E.J. 40, 1005–1007 (1994).
- "Ignition and extinction of flames near surfaces: Combustion of H2 in air" (with D.G. Vlachos and L.D. Schmidt). Comb. Flame 95, 313–335 (1993).
- "Kinetics of faceting of crystals in growth, etching, and equilibrium" (with D.G. Vlachos and L.D. Schmidt). Phys. Rev. 47, 4896–4909 (1993). 275. "Continuous reactions in a non-isothermal CSTR-I. Multiplicity of steady states" (with P. Cicarelli). Chem. Eng. ScL 49, 621–631 (1994).
- " 'Almost discrete* F-distributed chemical species and reactions." Chem. Eng. Set 49, 581588 (1994).
- "Two eyes are better than one: Some reflections on the importance of having more than one viewpoint in mathematical modelling and other disciplines." Mathl Comput Model 18, 95–115 (1993).
- "Enhanced Q yields from methane oxidative coupling by means of a separative chemical reactor" (with A.L. Tonkovich and R.W. Carr). Science 262, 221–223 (1993).
- "Design and performance of a simulated countercurrent moving-bed separator" (with B.B. Fish and R.W. Carr). AJ.Ch.E.J. 39, 17831790 (1993).
- "Reaction of a continuous mixture in a bubbling fluidized bed" (with N.R. Amundson). Trans I. Chem. E 71, 611–617 (1993).
- "De Motu Arietum" (with B.S. Bachrach). In A Festschrift for Professor Lawrence Marcus (pp. 1–13). New York: Marcel Dekker, 1993.
- "The simulated countercurrent moving bed chromatographic reactor: A novel reactorseparator" (with A.K. Ray and R.W. Carr). Chem. Eng. Sci. 49, 69–480 (1994).
- "An essay on contemporary criticism." New Lit. Hist. 25, 35–46 (1994).
- "Complementary viewpoints: Some thoughts on binocular vision in mathematical modelling and Latin paleography." New Lit. Hist. 26, 395–417 (1995).
- "Jean Mabillon." In H. Damico and J.B. Zavadil (eds.), Medieval Scholarship: Biographical Studies on the Formation of a Discipline. Vol. 1: History, New York: Garland Publishing, Inc., 1995.
- "Chaos in a simple two-phase reactor" (with K. Alhumaizi). Chaos, Sol. Fracl 4, 1985 – 2014 (1994).
- "Adsorption kinetics for the case of step and S-shaped isotherms" (with A.V. Kruglov). A.LCh.E.J. 41, 2393–2398 (1995).
- "Mathematical models in catalyst design." In L.L. Hegedus (ed.), Catalyst Design: Progress and Perspectives, (pp. 213–244). New York: Wiley, 1987.
- "Shooting method for bifurcation analysis of boundary value problems" (with X. Song and L.D. Schmidt). Chem. Eng. Commun. 84, 217–229 (1989).
- "Bifurcation behavior in homogeneous-heterogeneous combustion: II. Computations for stagnation-point flow" (with X. Song, W.R. Williams, and L.D. Schmidt). Comb. Flame, 292–311 (1991).
- "Ignition and extinction of homogeneous-heterogeneous combustion: CH4 and C3H8 on Pt" (with X. Song, W.R. Williams, and L.D. Schmidt). Paper presented at the 23rd International Combustion Institute, 1990.
- "Reaction of a continuous mbcture in a bubbling fluidized bed" (with N.R. Amundson). In N.P. Cheremisinoff (ed.), Advances in Engineering Fluid Mechanics, (pp. 105–117). New York, 1996.
- "Comparison of small metal clusters: Ni, Pd, Pt, Cu, Ag, and Au" (with D.G. Vlachos and L.D. Schmidt). Z. Phys. D. 26, 156–158 (1993).
- "Dynamics of catalytic reactions on metal surfaces" (with L.D. Schmidt). In Unsteady State Processes in Catalysis, (pp. 203–216). Utrecht, Holland: VSP Press, 1990.
- "Computer-aided experimentation in countercurrent reaction chromatography and simulated countercurrent chromatography" (with B.B. Fish and R.W. Carr). Chem. Eng. Sci. 43, 1867–1873 (1988).
- "Determination of Arrhenius constants by linear and nonlinear fitting" (with N.H. Chen). A.LCh.E.J. 38, 626–628 (1992).
- "Effect of pressure on the combustion of methane near inert surfaces" (with A. Balakrishna, D.G. Vlachos and L.D. Schmidt). Comb. Flame, (to be published).
- "Forcing an entire bifurcation diagram: Case studies in chemical oscillators" (with I.G. Kevrekidis and L.D. Schmidt). Physica 23D, 391 (1986).
- "Finite element formulations for large-scale, coupled flows in adjacent porous and open fluid domains" (with A.G. Salinger and J.J. Derby). Int. J. Num. Meth. Fluids 18, 1185–1209 (1994).
- "Continuous countercurrent moving-bed separator" (with B.B. Fish and R.W. Carr). A.LCh.E.J. 35, 737–745 (1989).
- "Optimization of the countercurrent movingbed chromatographic separator" (with B.B. Fish and R.W. Carr). A.LCh.E.J. 39, 1621–627 (1993).
- " Autocatalytic continuous reactions in a stirred tank: I. Multiplicity of steady states" (with P. Cicarelli). Chem. Eng. Sci. 49, 5307–5313 (1994).
- "Pt-catalyzed combustion of CH4-C3-C8 mixtures" (with A. Balakrishna and L.D. Schmidt). Chem. Eng. Sci. 49, 11–18 (1994).
- "Steady-state flow transitions in the radiative Rayleigh–Benard problem: Visualizing a bifurcation diagram" (with A.G. Salinger and J.J. Derby). Vid. J. Eng. Res. 3, 97–109 (1993).
- "Parallel Gray/Scott reactions in a stirred vessel (Peter Gray festschrift)." Faraday-Trans. 92, 2839–2842 (1996).
- "Analysis of a continuous immobilization reactor." (Eli Ruckenstein festschrift) (with K. Roenigk). Ind. Eng. Chem. Res. 35, 2889–2899 (1996).
- "Reflections on Keats' equation (J. Villadsen festschrift)." Chem. Eng. Sci. 52, 2447–2455 (1997).
- "Mass transfer from small ascending bubbles" (M.M. Sharma festschrift). Chem. Eng. Sci. 52 (24), 4439–4446 (1997).
- "Model reduction in a class of multi-phase systems" (H. Brenner festschrift). Chem. Eng. Comm. 148–150, 285–289 (1996).
- "A fine flurry of fudge factors" (AIChE Institute Lecture, 1997) Chem. Eng. Prog.
- "On some dynamical diagrams of chemical reaction engineering." Chaos 9 (3) (1999).
- "Dissections, transgressions and perilous paths." Mathl Comp. Model. 28, 91–101 (1998).
- "The beauty of self-adjoint symmetry" (with D. Ramkrishna). Ind. Eng. Chem. Res 38 (3), 845–850 (1999).
