= Petron (physician) =

Ancient Greek Physician

Petron (Greek: Πέτρων), also known as Petronas, was an ancient Greek physician from the island of Aegina. He was alive most likely around the middle of the 4th century BC and is known to have lived before Herophilus and Erasistratus, as well as after Hippocrates. Petron authored a work on pharmacy and was famous for fever treatment. He is also mentioned in one of Galen's works.
