= Global Research Alliance =

Indian research institute

The Global Research Alliance is an organisation that promotes the Millennium Development Goals through research and development. It was launched in New Delhi, India in January 2003.

Its guiding principle are stated as:

"Undertaking large-impact projects for the benefit of society;
Creating synergy by pooling the energies, skills and facilities of participants
Promoting projects with high innovation content; and
Developing global knowledge networks for industry and industrial sectors to enhance their competitiveness"

The current leader is Raghunath Mashelkar.
