= Separator (oil production) =

Pressure vessel used to separate gaseous and liquid hydrocarbons

The term separator in oilfield terminology designates a pressure vessel used for separating well fluids produced from oil and gas wells into gaseous and liquid components. A separator for petroleum production is a large vessel designed to separate production fluids into their constituent components of oil, gas and water. A separating vessel may be referred to in the following ways: Oil and gas separator, Separator, Stage separator, Trap, Knockout vessel (Knockout drum, knockout trap, water knockout, or liquid knockout), Flash chamber (flash vessel or flash trap), Expansion separator or expansion vessel, Scrubber (gas scrubber), Filter (gas filter). These separating vessels are normally used on a producing lease or platform near the wellhead, manifold, or tank battery to separate fluids produced from oil and gas wells into oil and gas or liquid and gas. An oil and gas separator generally includes the following essential components and features:

1. A vessel that includes (a) primary separation device and/or section, (b) secondary "gravity" settling (separating) section, (c) mist extractor to remove small liquid particles from the gas, (d) gas outlet, (e) liquid settling (separating) section to remove gas or vapor from oil (on a three-phase unit, this section also separates water from oil), (f) oil outlet, and (g) water outlet (three-phase unit).
2. Adequate volumetric liquid capacity to handle liquid surges (slugs) from the wells and/or flowlines.
3. Adequate vessel diameter and height or length to allow most of the liquid to separate from the gas so that the mist extractor will not be flooded.
4. A means of controlling an oil level in the separator, which usually includes a liquid-level controller and a diaphragm motor valve on the oil outlet.
5. A back pressure valve on the gas outlet to maintain a steady pressure in the vessel.
6. Pressure relief devices.

Separators work on the principle that the three components have different densities, which allows them to stratify when moving slowly with gas on top, water on the bottom and oil in the middle. Any solids such as sand will also settle in the bottom of the separator. The functions of oil and gas separators can be divided into the primary and secondary functions which will be discussed later on.

== Classification of oil and gas separators ==
=== By operating configuration ===
Oil and gas separators can have three general configurations: vertical, horizontal, and spherical. Vertical separators can vary in size from 10 or 12 inches in diameter and 4 to 5 feet seam to seam (S to S) up to 10 or 12 feet in diameter and 15 to 25 feet S to S. Horizontal separators may vary in size from 10 or 12 inches in diameter and 4 to 5 feet S to S up to 15 to 16 feet in diameter and 60 to 70 feet S to S. Spherical separators are usually available in 24 or 30 inch up to 66 to 72 inch in diameter. Horizontal oil and gas separators are manufactured with monotube and dual-tube shells. Monotube units have one cylindrical shell, and dual-tube units have two cylindrical parallel shells with one above the other. Both types of units can be used for two-phase and three-phase service. A monotube horizontal oil and gas separator is usually preferred over a dual-tube unit. The monotube unit has greater area for gas flow as well as a greater oil/gas interface area than is usually available in a dual-tube separator of comparable price. The monotube separator will usually afford a longer retention time because the larger single-tube vessel retains a larger volume of oil than the dual-tube separator. It is also easier to clean than the dual-tube unit. In cold climates, freezing will likely cause less trouble in the monotube unit because the liquid is usually in close contact with the warm stream of gas flowing through the separator. The monotube design normally has a lower silhouette than the dual-tube unit, and it is easier to stack them for multiple-stage separation on offshore platforms where space is limited. It was illustrated by Powers et al (1990) that vertical separators should be constructed such that the flow stream enters near the top and passes through a gas/liquid separating chamber even though they are not competitive alternatives unlike the horizontal separators.

=== By function ===
The three configurations of separators are available for two-phase operation and three-phase operation. In the two-phase units, gas is separated from the liquid with the gas and liquid being discharged separately. Oil and gas separators are mechanically designed such that the liquid and gas components are separated from the hydrocarbon steam at specific temperature and pressure according to Arnold et al (2008). In three-phase separators, well fluid is separated into gas, oil, and water with the three fluids being discharged separately. The gas–liquid separation section of the separator is determined by the maximum removal droplet size using the Souders–Brown equation with an appropriate K factor. The oil-water separation section is held for a retention time that is provided by laboratory test data, pilot plant operating procedure, or operating experience. In the case where the retention time is not available, the recommended retention time for three-phase separator in API 12J is used. The sizing methods by K factor and retention time give proper separator sizes. According to Song et al (2010), engineers sometimes need further information for the design conditions of downstream equipment, i.e., liquid loading for the mist extractor, water content for the crude dehydrator/desalter or oil content for the water treatment.

=== By operating pressure ===
Oil and gas separators can operate at pressures ranging from a high vacuum to 4,000 to 5,000 psi. Most oil and gas separators operate in the pressure range of 20 to 1,500 psi. Separators may be referred to as low pressure, medium pressure, or high pressure. Low-pressure separators usually operate at pressures ranging from 10 to 20 up to 180 to 225 psi. Medium-pressure separators usually operate at pressures ranging from 230 to 250 up to 600 to 700 psi. High-pressure separators generally operate in the wide pressure range from 750 to 1,500 psi.

=== By application ===
Oil and gas separators may be classified according to application as test separator, production separator, low temperature separator, metering separator, elevated separator, and stage separators (first stage, second stage, etc.).

Test separator

Test Separator

A test separator is used to separate and to meter the well fluids. The test separator can be referred to as a well tester or well checker. Test separators can be vertical, horizontal, or spherical. They can be two-phase or three-phase. They can be permanently installed or portable (skid or trailer mounted). Test separators can be equipped with various types of meters for measuring the oil, gas, and/or water for potential tests, periodic production tests, marginal well tests, etc.:
Production separator
A production separator is used to separate the produced well fluid from a well, group of wells, or a lease on a daily or continuous basis. Production separators can be vertical, horizontal, or spherical. They can be two-phase or three-phase. Production separators range in size from 12 in. to 15 ft in diameter, with most units ranging from 30 in. to 10 ft in diameter. They range in length from 6 to 70 ft, with most from 10 to 40 ft long. In small onshore oilfield applications, a production separator can be integrated in a vapor-tight tank package.
Low-temperature separator
A low-temperature separator is a special one in which high-pressure well fluid is jetted into the vessel through a choke or pressure reducing valve so that the separator temperature is reduced appreciably below the well-fluid temperature. The temperature reduction is obtained by the Joule–Thomson effect of expanding well fluid as it flows through the pressure-reducing choke or valve into the separator. The lower operating temperature in the separator causes condensation of vapors that otherwise would exit the separator in the vapor state. Liquids thus recovered require stabilization to prevent excessive evaporation in the storage tanks.
Metering separator
The function of separating well fluids into oil, gas, and water and metering the liquids can be accomplished in one vessel. These vessels are commonly referred to as metering separators and are available for two-phase and three-phase operation. These units are available in special models that make them suitable for accurately metering foaming and heavy viscous oil.

== Primary functions of oil and gas separators ==
Separation of oil from gas may begin as the fluid flows through the producing formation into the well bore and may progressively increase through the tubing, flow lines, and surface handling equipment. Under certain conditions, the fluid may be completely separated into liquid and gas before it reaches the oil and gas separator. In such cases, the separator vessel affords only an "enlargement" to permit gas to ascend to one outlet and liquid to descend to another.

=== Removal of oil from gas ===
Difference in density of the liquid and gaseous hydrocarbons may accomplish acceptable separation in an oil and gas separator. However, in some instances, it is necessary to use mechanical devices commonly referred to as "mist extractors" to remove liquid mist from the gas before it is discharged from the separator. Also, it may be desirable or necessary to use some means to remove non solution gas from the oil before the oil is discharged from the separator.

=== Removal of gas from oil ===
The physical and chemical characteristics of the oil and its conditions of pressure and temperature determine the amount of gas it will contain in solution. The rate at which the gas is liberated from a given oil is a function of change in pressure and temperature. The volume of gas that an oil and gas separator will remove from crude oil is dependent on (1) physical and chemical characteristics of the crude, (2) operating pressure, (3) operating temperature, (4) rate of throughput, (5) size and configuration of the separator, and (6) other factors.

Agitation, heat, special baffling, coalescing packs, and filtering materials can assist in the removal of nonsolution gas that otherwise may be retained in the oil because of the viscosity and surface tension of the oil. Gas can be removed from the top of the drum by virtue of being gas. Oil and water are separated by a baffle at the end of the separator, which is set at a height close to the oil-water contact, allowing oil to spill over onto the other side, while trapping water on the near side. The two fluids can then be piped out of the separator from their respective sides of the baffle. The produced water is then either injected back into the oil reservoir, disposed of, or treated. The bulk level (gas–liquid interface) and the oil water interface are determined using instrumentation fixed to the vessel. Valves on the oil and water outlets are controlled to ensure the interfaces are kept at their optimum levels for separation to occur. The separator will only achieve bulk separation. The smaller droplets of water will not settle by gravity and will remain in the oil stream. Normally the oil from the separator is routed to a coalescer to further reduce the water content.

=== Separation of water from oil ===
The production of water with oil continues to be a problem for engineers and the oil producers. Since 1865 when water was coproduced with hydrocarbons, separation of valuable hydrocarbons from disposable water has challenged and frustrated the oil industry. According to Rehm et al (1983), innovation over the years has led from the skim pit to installation of the stock tank, to the gunbarrel, to the freewater knockout, to the hay-packed coalescer and most recently to the Performax Matrix Plate Coalescer, an enhanced gravity settling separator. The history of water treating for the most part has been sketchy and spartan. There is little economic value to the produced water, and it represents an extra cost for the producer to arrange for its disposal.

Today, oil fields produce greater quantities of water than they produce oil. Along with greater water production are emulsions and dispersions which are more difficult to treat. The separation process becomes interlocked with a myriad of contaminants as the last drop of oil is being recovered from the reservoir. In some instances it is preferable to separate and to remove water from the well fluid before it flows through pressure reductions, such as those caused by chokes and valves. Such water removal may prevent difficulties that could be caused downstream by the water, such as corrosion which can be referred to as being a chemical reactions that occurs whenever a gas or liquid chemically attacks an exposed metallic surface. Corrosion is usually accelerated by warm temperatures and likewise by the presence of acids and salts.

Other factors that affect the removal of water from oil include hydrate formation and the formation of tight emulsion that may be difficult to resolve into oil and water. The water can be separated from the oil in a three-phase separator by use of chemicals and gravity separation. If the three-phase separator is not large enough to separate the water adequately, it can be separated in a free-water knockout vessel installed upstream or downstream of the separators.

== Secondary functions ==
=== Maintenance of optimum pressure on separator ===
For an oil and gas separator to accomplish its primary functions, pressure must be maintained in the separator so that the liquid and gas can be discharged into their respective processing or gathering systems. Pressure is maintained on the separator by use of a gas backpressure valve on each separator or with one master backpressure valve that controls the pressure on a battery of two or more separators. The optimum pressure to maintain on a separator is the pressure that will result in the highest economic yield from the sale of the liquid and gaseous hydrocarbons.

=== Maintenance of liquid seal in separator ===
To maintain pressure on a separator, a liquid seal must be effected in the lower portion of the vessel. This liquid seal prevents loss of gas with the oil and requires the use of a liquid-level controller and a valve.

== Methods used to remove oil from gas ==
Effective oil-gas separation is important not only to ensure that the required export quality is achieved but also to prevent problems in downstream process equipment and compressors. Once the bulk liquid has been knocked out, which can be achieved in many ways, the remaining liquid droplets are separated from by a demisting device. Until recently the main technologies used for this application were reverse-flow cyclones, mesh pads and vane packs. More recently new devices with higher gas-handling have been developed which have enabled potential reduction in the scrubber vessel size. There are several new concepts currently under development in which the fluids are degassed upstream of the primary separator. These systems are based on centrifugal and turbine technology and have additional advantages in that they are compact and motion insensitive, hence ideal for floating production facilities. Below are some of the ways in which oil is separated from gas in separators.

=== Density difference (gravity separation) ===
Natural gas is lighter than liquid hydrocarbon. Minute particles of liquid hydrocarbon that are temporarily suspended in a stream of natural gas will, by density difference or force of gravity, settle out of the stream of gas if the velocity of the gas is sufficiently slow. The larger droplets of hydrocarbon will quickly settle out of the gas, but the smaller ones will take longer. At standard conditions of pressure and temperature, the droplets of liquid hydrocarbon may have a density 400 to 1,600 times that of natural gas. However, as the operating pressure and temperature increase, the difference in density decreases. At an operating pressure of 800 psig, the liquid hydrocarbon may be only 6 to 10 times as dense as the gas. Thus, operating pressure materially affects the size of the separator and the size and type of mist extractor required to separate adequately the liquid and gas. The fact that the liquid droplets may have a density 6 to 10 times that of the gas may indicate that droplets of liquid would quickly settle out of and separate from the gas. However, this may not occur because the particles of liquid may be so small that they tend to "float" in the gas and may not settle out of the gas stream in the short period of time the gas is in the oil and gas separator. As the operating pressure on a separator increases, the density difference between the liquid and gas decreases. For this reason, it is desirable to operate oil and gas separators at as low a pressure as is consistent with other process variables, conditions, and requirements.

=== Impingement ===
If a flowing stream of gas containing liquid, mist is impinged against a surface, the liquid mist may adhere to and coalesce on the surface. After the mist coalesces into larger droplets, the droplets will gravitate to the liquid section of the vessel. If the liquid content of the gas is high, or if the mist particles are extremely fine, several successive impingement surfaces may be required to effect satisfactory removal of the mist.

=== Change of flow direction ===
When the direction of flow of a gas stream containing liquid mist is changed abruptly, inertia causes the liquid to continue in the original direction of flow. Separation of liquid mist from the gas thus can be effected because the gas will more readily assume the change of flow direction and will flow away from the liquid mist particles. The liquid thus removed may coalesce on a surface or fall to the liquid section below.

=== Change of flow velocity ===
Separation of liquid and gas can be effected with either a sudden increase or decrease in gas velocity. Both conditions use the difference in inertia of gas and liquid. With a decrease in velocity, the higher inertia of the liquid mist carries it forward and away from the gas. The liquid may then coalesce on some surface and gravitate to the liquid section of the separator. With an increase in gas velocity, the higher inertia of the liquid causes the gas to move away from the liquid, and the liquid may fall to the liquid section of the vessel.

=== Centrifugal force ===
If a gas stream carrying liquid mist flows in a circular motion at sufficiently high velocity, centrifugal force throws the liquid mist outward against the walls of the container. Here the liquid coalesces into progressively larger droplets and finally gravitates to the liquid section below. Centrifugal force is one of the most effective methods of separating liquid mist from gas. However, according to Keplinger (1931), some separator designers have pointed out a disadvantage in that a liquid with a free surface rotating as a whole will have its surface curved around its lowest point lying on the axis of rotation. This created false level may cause difficulty in regulating the fluid level control on the separator. This is largely overcome by placing vertical quieting baffles which should extend from the bottom of the separator to above the outlet. Efficiency of this type of mist extractor increases as the velocity of the gas stream increases. Thus for a given rate of throughput, a smaller centrifugal separator will suffice.

== Methods used to remove gas from oil ==
Because of higher prices for natural gas, the widespread reliance on metering of liquid hydrocarbons, and other reasons, it is important to remove all nonsolution gas from crude oil during field processing. Methods used to remove gas from crude oil in oil and gas separators are discussed below:

=== Agitation ===
Moderate, controlled agitation which can be defined as movement of the crude oil with sudden force is usually helpful in removing nonsolution gas that may be mechanically locked in the oil by surface tension and oil viscosity. Agitation usually will cause the gas bubbles to coalesce and to separate from the oil in less time than would be required if agitation were not used.

=== Heat ===
Heat as a form of energy that is transferred from one body to another results in a difference in temperature. This reduces surface tension and viscosity of the oil and thus assists in releasing gas that is hydraulically retained in the oil. The most effective method of heating crude oil is to pass it through a heated-water bath. A spreader plate that disperses the oil into small streams or rivulets increases the effectiveness of the heated-water bath. Upward flow of the oil through the water bath affords slight agitation, which is helpful in coalescing and separating entrained gas from the oil. A heated-water bath is probably the most effective method of removing foam bubbles from foaming crude oil. A heated-water bath is not practical in most oil and gas separators, but heat can be added to the oil by direct or indirect fired heaters and/or heat exchangers, or heated free-water knockouts or emulsion treaters can be used to obtain a heated-water bath.

=== Centrifugal force ===
Centrifugal force which can be defined as a fictitious force, peculiar to a particle moving on a circular path, that has the same magnitude and dimensions as the force that keeps the particle on its circular path (the centripetal force) but points in the opposite direction is effective in separating gas from oil. The heavier oil is thrown outward against the wall of the vortex retainer while the gas occupies the inner portion of the vortex. A properly shaped and sized vortex will allow the gas to ascend while the liquid flows downward to the bottom of the unit.

== Flow measurements ==
The direction of flow in and around a separator along with other flow instruments are usually illustrated on the Piping and instrumentation diagram, (P&ID). Some of these flow instruments include the Flow Indicator (FI), Flow Transmitter (FT) and the Flow Controller (FC). Flow is of paramount importance in the oil and gas industry because flow, as a major process variable is essentially important in that its understanding helps engineers come up with better designs and enables them to confidently carry out additional research. Mohan et al (1999) carried out a research into the design and development of separators for a three-phase flow system. The purpose of the study was to investigate the complex multiphase hydrodynamic flow behaviour in a three-phase oil and gas separator. A mechanistic model was developed alongside a computational fluid dynamics (CFD) simulator. These were then used to carry out a detailed experimentation on the three-phase separator. The experimental and CFD simulation results were suitably integrated with the mechanistic model. The simulation time for the experiment was 20 seconds with the oil specific gravity as 0.885, and the separator lower part length and diameter were 4-ft and 3-inches respectively. The first set of experiment became a basis through which detailed investigations were used to carry out and to conduct similar simulation studies for different flow velocities and other operating conditions as well.

== Flow calibration ==
As earlier stated, flow instruments that function with the separator in an oil and gas environment include the flow indicator, flow transmitter and the flow controller. Due to maintenance (which will be discussed later) or due to high usage, these flowmeters do need to be calibrated from time to time. Calibration can be defined as the process of referencing signals of known quantity that has been predetermined to suit the range of measurements required. Calibration can also be seen from a mathematical point of view in which the flowmeters are standardized by determining the deviation from the predetermined standard so as to ascertain the proper correction factors. In determining the deviation from the predetermined standard, the actual flowrate is usually first determined with the use of a master meter which is a type of flowmeter that has been calibrated with a high degree of accuracy or by weighing the flow so as to be able to obtain a gravimetric reading of the mass flow.

Another type of meter used is the transfer meter. However, according to Ting et al (1989), transfer meters have been proven to be less accurate if the operating conditions are different from its original calibrated points. According to Yoder (2000), the types of flowmeters used as master meters include turbine meters, positive displacement meters, venturi meters, and Coriolis meters. In the U.S., master meters are often calibrated at a flow lab that has been certified by the National Institute of Standards and Technology, (NIST). NIST certification of a flowmeter lab means that its methods have been approved by NIST. Normally, this includes NIST traceability, meaning that the standards used in the flowmeter calibration process have been certified by NIST or are causally linked back to standards that have been approved by NIST. However, there is a general belief in the industry that the second method which involves the gravimetric weighing of the amount of fluid (liquid or gas) that actually flows through the meter into or out of a container during the calibration procedure is the most ideal method for measuring the actual amount of flow. Apparently, the weighing scale used for this method also has to be traceable to the National Institute of Standards and Technology (NIST) as well.

In ascertaining a proper correction factor, there is often no simple hardware adjustment to make the flowmeter start reading correctly. Instead, the deviation from the correct reading is recorded at a variety of flowrates. The data points are plotted, comparing the flowmeter output to the actual flowrate as determined by the standardized National Institute of Standards and Technology master meter or weigh scale.

== Controls and features ==
=== Controls ===
The controls required for oil and gas separators are liquid level controllers for oil and oil/water interface (three-phase operation) and gas back-pressure control valve with pressure controller. Although the use of controls is expensive making the cost of operating fields with separators so high, installations has resulted in substantial savings in the overall operating expense as in the case of the 70 gas wells in the Big Piney, Wyo sighted by Fair (1968). The wells with separators were located above 7,200 ft elevation, ranging upward to 9,000 ft. Control installations were sufficiently automated such that the field operations around the controllers could be operated from a remote-control station at the field office using the Distributed Control System. All in all, this improved the efficiency of personnel and the operation of the field, with a corresponding increase in production from the area.

=== Valves ===
The valves required for oil and gas separators are oil discharge control valve, water-discharge control valve (three-phase operation), drain valves, block valves, pressure relief valves, and emergency shutdown valves (ESD). ESD valves typically stay in open position for months or years awaiting a command signal to operate. Little attention is paid to these valves outside of scheduled turnarounds. The pressures of continuous production often stretch these intervals even longer. This leads to build up or corrosion on these valves that prevents them from moving. For safety critical applications, it must be ensured that the valves operate upon demand.

=== Accessories ===
The accessories required for oil and gas separators are pressure gauges, thermometers, pressure-reducing regulators (for control gas), level sight glasses, safety head with rupture disk, piping, and tubing.

=== Safety features ===
Oil and gas separators should be installed at a safe distance from other lease equipment. Where they are installed on offshore platforms or in close proximity to other equipment, precautions should be taken to prevent injury to personnel and damage to surrounding equipment in case the separator or its controls or accessories fail. The following safety features are recommended for most oil and gas separators.

High- and low-liquid-level controls
High- and low liquid-level controls normally are float-operated pilots that actuate a valve on the inlet to the separator, open a bypass around the separator, sound a warning alarm, or perform some other pertinent function to prevent damage that might result from high or low liquid levels in the separator.
High- and low-pressure controls
High- and low pressure controls are installed on separators to prevent excessively high or low pressures from interfering with normal operations. These high- and low-pressure controls can be mechanical, pneumatic, or electric and can sound a warning, actuate a shut-in valve, open a bypass, or perform other pertinent functions to protect personnel, the separator, and surrounding equipment.
High- and low-temperature controls
Temperature controls may be installed on separators to shut in the unit, to open or to close a bypass to a heater, or to sound a warning should the temperature in the separator become too high or too low. Such temperature controls are not normally used on separators, but they may be appropriate in special cases. According to Francis (1951), low-temperature controls in separators is another tools used by gas producers which finds its application in the high-pressure gas fields, usually referred to as "vapour-phase" reservoirs. Low temperatures obtainable from the expansion of these high-pressure gas streams are utilized to a profitable advantage. A more efficient recovery of the hydrocarbon condensate and a greater degree of dehydration of the gas as compared to the conventional heater and separator installation is a major advantage of low-temperature controls in oil and gas separators.
Safety relief valves
A spring-loaded safety relief valve is usually installed on all oil and gas separators. These valves normally are set at the design pressure of the vessel. Safety relief valves serve primarily as a warning, and in most instances are too small to handle the full rated fluid capacity of the separator. Full-capacity safety relief valves can be used and are particularly recommended when no safety head (rupture disk) is used on the separator.
Safety heads or rupture disks
A safety head or rupture disk is a device containing a thin metal membrane that is designed to rupture when the pressure in the separator exceeds a predetermined value. This is usually from 1 1/4 to 1% times the design pressure of the separator vessel. The safety head disk is usually selected so that it will not rupture until the safety relief valve has opened and is incapable of preventing excessive pressure buildup in the separator.

== Operation and maintenance considerations ==
Over the life of a production system, the separator is expected to process a wide range of produced fluids. With break through from water flood and expanded gas lift circulation, the produced fluid water cut and gas-oil ratio is ever changing. In many instances, the separator fluid loading may exceed the original design capacity of the vessel. As a result, many operators find their separator no longer able to meet the required oil and water effluent standards, or experience high liquid carry-over in the gas according to Power et al (1990). Some operational maintenance and considerations are discussed below:

=== Periodic inspection ===
In refineries and processing plants, it is normal practice to inspect all pressure vessels and piping periodically for corrosion and erosion. In the oil fields, this practice is not generally followed (they are inspected at a predetermined frequency, normally decided by an RBI assessment) and equipment is replaced only after actual failure. This policy may create hazardous conditions for operating personnel and surrounding equipment. It is recommended that periodic inspection schedules for all pressure equipment be established and followed to protect against undue failures.

=== Installation of safety devices ===
All safety relief devices should be installed as close to the vessel as possible and in such manner that the reaction force from exhausting fluids will not break off, unscrew, or otherwise dislodge the safety device. The discharge from safety devices should not endanger personnel or other equipment.

=== Low temperature ===
Separators should be operated above hydrate-formation temperature. Otherwise hydrates may form in the vessel and partially or completely plug it thereby reducing the capacity of the separator. In some instances when the liquid or gas outlet is plugged or restricted, this causes the safety valve to open or the safety head to rupture. Steam coils can be installed in the liquid section of oil and gas separators to melt hydrates that may form there. This is especially appropriate on low-temperature separators.

=== Corrosive fluids ===
A separator handling corrosive fluid should be checked periodically to determine whether remedial work is required. Extreme cases of corrosion may require a reduction in the rated working pressure of the vessel. Periodic hydrostatic testing is recommended, especially if the fluids being handled are corrosive. Expendable anode can be used in separators to protect them against electrolytic corrosion. Some operators determine separator shell and head thickness with ultrasonic thickness indicators and calculate the maximum allowable working pressure from the remaining metal thickness. This should be done yearly offshore and every two to four years onshore.

=== Solids separation ===
Sand and other solids from upstream will tend to settle out in the bottom of the separators. If allowed to accumulate the solids reduce the volume available for oil/gas/water separation reducing efficiency. The vessel may be taken offline and drained down and the solids removed by digging out by hand. Or water sparge pipes in the base of the separator used to fluidize the sand which can be drained from the drain valves in the base.

== See also ==
- Piping and instrumentation diagram
- Fluid dynamics
- Computational fluid dynamics
- Souders–Brown equation
- Joule–Thomson effect
- Vapor–liquid separator
- Natural gas condensate
- Oil production plant
- Heat
- Cyclone separator
- Valve
- Stokes' law
- Safety
