= Vapor horn =

A Vapor horn is a device used primarily for two-phase (liquid/vapor) feeds to petroleum refinery fractionators, which is designed to provide both bulk phase separation of the vapor and liquid, and to provide initial distribution of the feed vapor.

== Operation ==
For vapor/liquid phase separation, vapor horns utilize an open bottom construction and induced centrifugal action to direct entrained liquid particles to the column wall, which will then flow down into the column sump or collector tray below. Some vapor horn designs employ baffles, to avoid excessive impingement and splashing which can result in the formation of small liquid particles that are at higher risk of being re-entrained. Additional baffles can be employed to eliminate cyclonic motion once the bulk phase separation is complete and the swirling motion is no longer desirable. Some vapor horns have been designed to handle high inlet velocities.

== Applications ==
Vapor horns often find application on the inlet to crude oil vacuum distillation towers, where liquid entrainment can be quite detrimental to tower performance. It has been noted that in high vapor rate vacuum services, vapor horns have low levels of entrainment relative to similar technologies. In some cases, refiners have removed vapor horns within vacuum towers to reduce coking. While this does work as intended, it also has the unintended consequence of increasing carryover into heavy vacuum gas oil, thereby lowering its quality.
