= Air brake (road vehicle) =

Type of friction brake for vehicles

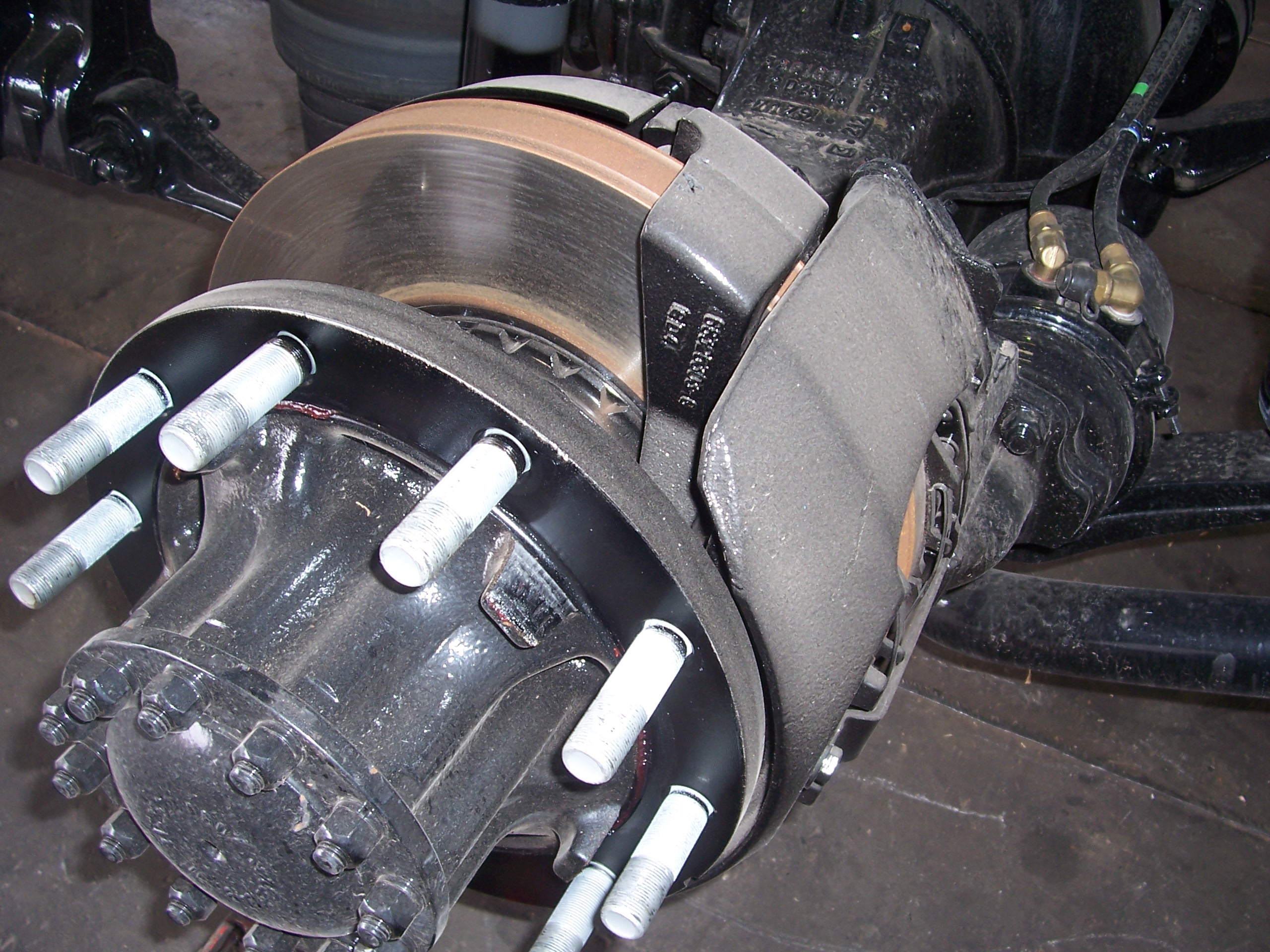
Truck air-actuated disc brake

An air brake or, more formally, a compressed-air-brake system, is a type of friction brake for vehicles in which compressed air pressing on a piston is used to both release the parking/emergency brakes in order to move the vehicle, and also to apply pressure to the brake pads or brake shoes to slow and stop the vehicle. Air brakes are used in large heavy vehicles, particularly those having multiple trailers which must be linked into the brake system, such as trucks, buses, Class A “diesel pusher” motorhomes, Super C motorhomes, trailers, and semi-trailers, in addition to their use in railroad trains. George Westinghouse first developed air brakes for use in railway service. He patented a safer air brake on March 5, 1872. Westinghouse made numerous alterations to improve his air pressured brake invention, which led to various forms of the automatic brake. In the early 20th century, after its advantages were proven in railway use, it was adopted by manufacturers of trucks and heavy road vehicles.

== Design and function ==
Air brakes are typically used on heavy trucks and buses. Typical operating pressure is approximately 100–120 psi or 690–830 kPa or 6.9–8.3 bar. A compressed-air-brake system is divided into a supply system and a control system.

The supply system compresses, stores and supplies high-pressure air to the control system as well as to additional air operated auxiliary truck systems (gearbox shift control, clutch pedal air assistance servo, etc.). The air compressor draws filtered air from the atmosphere and compresses it, storing the compressed air in high-pressure reservoirs. Most heavy vehicles have a gauge within the driver's view, indicating the availability of air pressure for safe vehicle operation, often including warning tones or lights. A mechanical "wig wag" that automatically drops down into the driver's field of vision when the pressure drops below a certain point is also common.

The control system consists of service brakes, parking brakes, a control pedal, and an air storage tank. If the vehicle is towing a trailer, it often has a separate trailer-brake system that receives compressed air from the supply system.

The parking brakes use a disc or drum arrangement which is designed to be held in the 'applied' position by spring pressure. Air pressure must be produced to release these "spring brake" parking brakes. Setting the parking/emergency brake releases the pressurized air in the lines between the compressed air storage tank and the brakes, thus allowing the spring actuated parking brake to engage. A sudden loss of air pressure would result in full spring brake pressure immediately.

The service brakes are used while driving for slowing or stopping the vehicle. When the brake pedal is pushed to apply the service brakes, air is routed under pressure from a supply reservoir to the service brake chamber, causing the brake to be engaged. When the pedal is released, a return spring in the brake chamber disengages the brake, and the compressed air is exhausted to the atmosphere. Most types of truck air brakes are drum brakes, though there is an increasing trend towards the use of disc brakes.

=== Supply system ===
Highly simplified air-brake diagram
(does not show all air reservoirs and all applicable air valves)
1	Air compressor	7	Park brake hand control valve
2	Pressure regulator	8	Park brake safety release valve
3	Air dryer	9	Brake foot valve
4	Regeneration reservoir	10	Front air-brake chambers
5	Four-way protection valve	11	Brake-relay valve and load-sensing valve
6	Compressed-air reservoirs	12	Rear-spring brake chambers

The air compressor (1) is driven by the engine either by crankshaft pulley via a belt or directly from the engine timing gears. Typically, it is lubricated and cooled by the engine lubrication and cooling systems, but some systems use self-lubricated compressors and/or air-cooled compressors. System pressure is regulated by a governor between a minimum and maximum value; the governor unloads the compressor when the maximum system pressure has been achieved and loads the compressor when it falls below its minimum setpoint.

When the compressor is loaded, compressed air is first routed through a cooling coil and into an air dryer (3) which removes moisture and oil impurities and also may include a pressure regulator (2), safety valve and smaller purge reservoir (4). As an alternative to the air dryer, the supply system can be equipped with an anti-freeze device and oil separator.

The compressed air is then stored in a supply reservoir (6); the supply reservoir, which is physically closest to the compressor, is also called a wet tank because the majority of oil and water from the compressor gather here. A second, downstream reservoir is called the service reservoir, and forms the primary source for brake operation. The supply and service reservoirs are sized to allow several service brake applications if the compressor fails or the engine stops. From the service reservoir, compressed air is then distributed via a four-way protection valve (5) into the primary reservoir (rear brake reservoir) and the secondary reservoir (front/trailer-brake reservoir), a parking-brake reservoir, and an auxiliary air supply distribution point.

The supply system also includes various check, pressure limiting, drain and safety valves.

=== Control system ===
The control system is further divided into two service brake-circuits, the parking brake-circuit, and the trailer brake-circuit.

The dual-service brake circuits are further split into front- and rear-wheel circuits which receive compressed air from their individual supply reservoirs for added safety in case of an air leak. The service brakes are applied by means of a brake pedal air valve (9) which regulates both circuits. Depressing the brake pedal allows compressed air stored in the respective supply reservoirs to enter each service brake chamber (10) and (12), causing the service brakes to actuate. Releasing the brake pedal disconnects the supply reservoirs; a brake return spring forces the service brakes to release, and the compressed air that was used to actuate the service brakes is exhausted to the atmosphere. Repeated application of the service brakes will deplete the air reservoir pressure, prompting the governor to load the compressor again.

Relay valve(s) are used to improve brake response with long lines. Routing the lines for the rear and trailer service brakes through the brake pedal air valve could result in unacceptably slow actuation, so these brakes are plumbed directly to the service reservoir through a local relay valve (11) and the line from the brake pedal air valve is used to actuate the relay valve instead of the service brakes. Similarly, quick-release valve(s) are located close to their respective brakes and allow the air to be exhausted more quickly when the brakes are released.

The parking brake is the air operated spring brake type where the brake is applied by spring force in the spring brake cylinder (12) and released by compressed air via a hand-control valve (7).

The trailer brake consists of a direct two-line system: the supply line and the separate control or service line. The supply line receives air from the prime mover park brake air tank via a park brake relay valve and the control line is regulated via the trailer-brake relay valve. The operating signals for the relay are provided by the prime mover brake-pedal air valve, trailer service brake hand control (subject to local heavy vehicle legislation) and the prime mover park brake hand control.

=== Wig wag ===
Air-brake systems may include a wig wag device which deploys to warn the driver if the system air pressure drops too low.

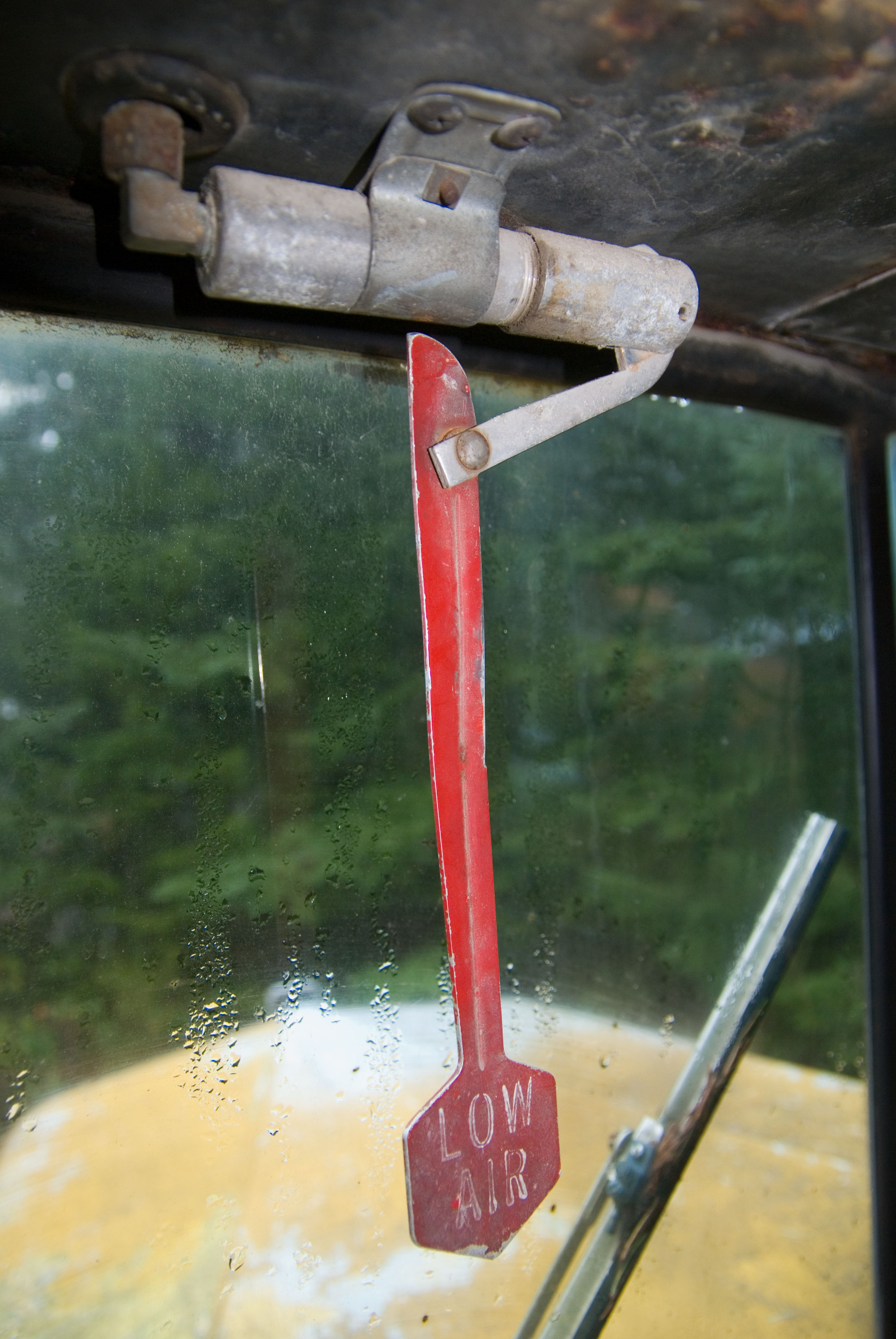
Manual wig wag in warning position

This device drops a mechanical arm into view when the pressure in the system drops below the threshold of sufficient pressure to reliably deploy the brakes.

An automatic wig wag will rise out of view when the pressure in the system rises above the threshold, while the manual-reset type must be placed out of view manually. Neither will stay in place unless the pressure in the system is above the threshold. The photo shows a manual wig wag which the operator swings to the right out of view; it will remain out of view only when the air pressure is above the threshold.

Most U.S. state commercial driver's license manuals, published by the states' Departments of Motor Vehicles or equivalents, describe this term.

Air brake relay valves

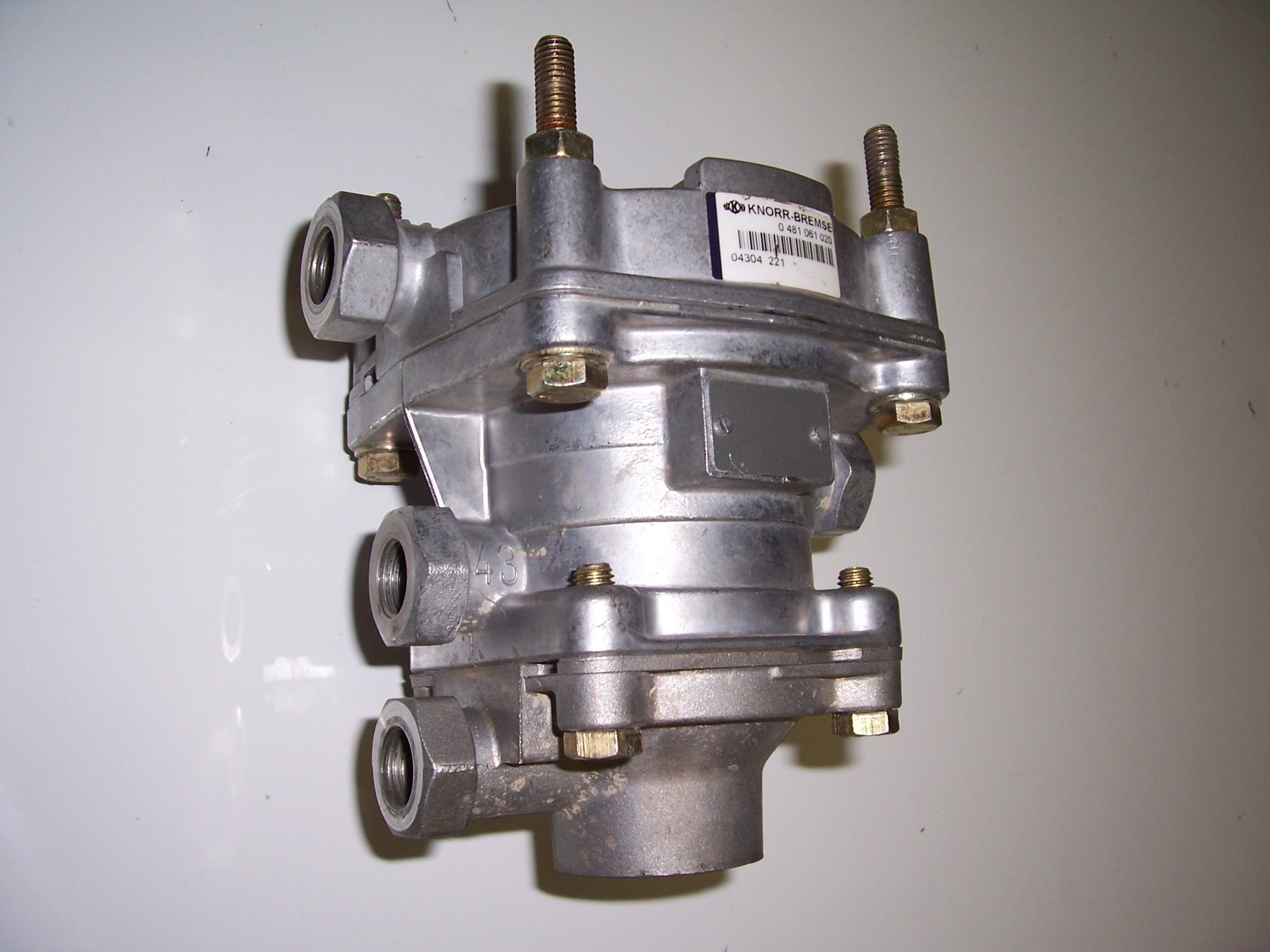
Trailer-brake relay valve

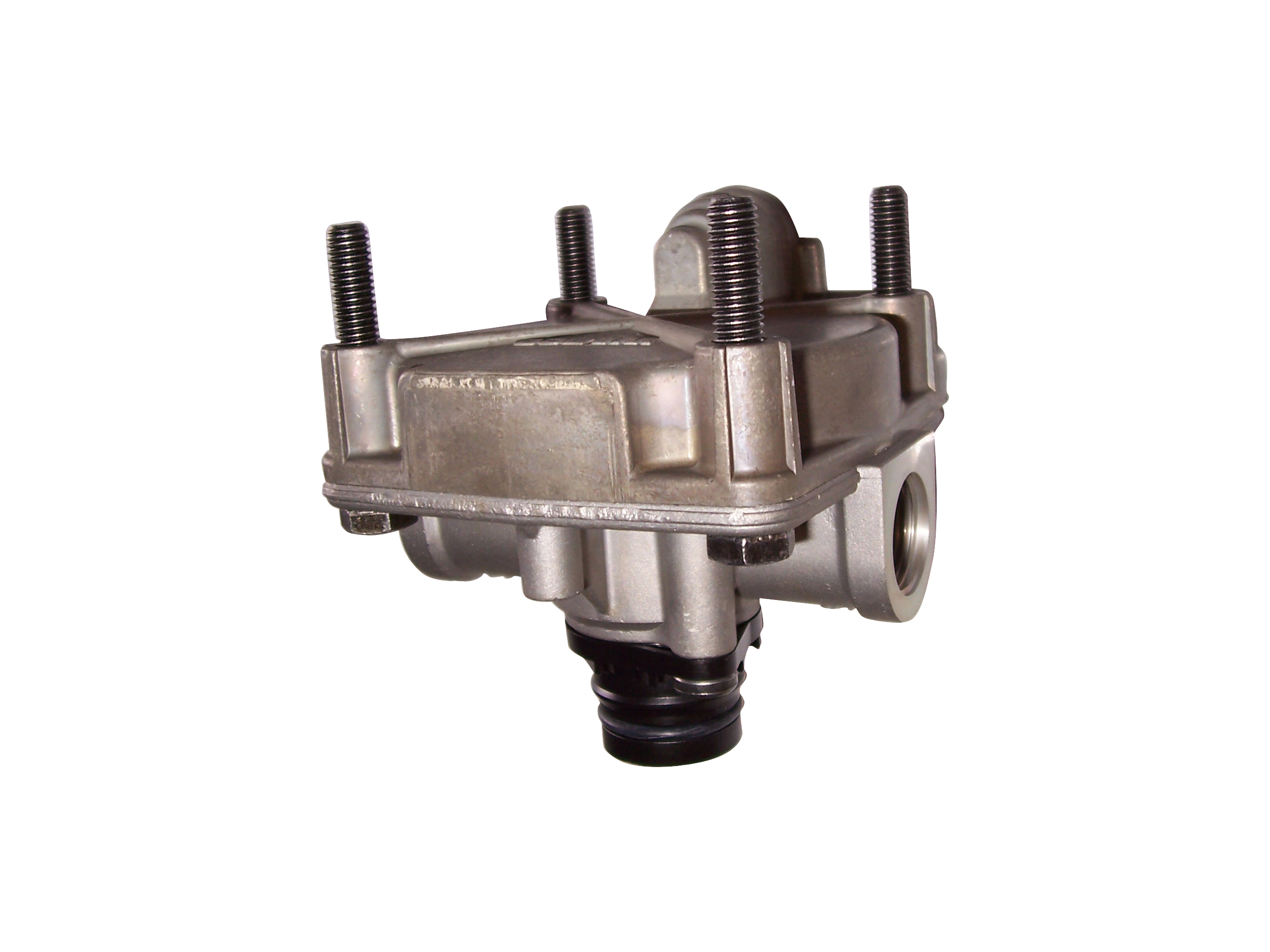
Air-brake relay valve

== Advantages ==
Air brakes are used as an alternative to hydraulic brakes which are used on lighter vehicles such as automobiles. Hydraulic brakes use a liquid (hydraulic fluid) to transfer pressure from the brake pedal to the brake shoe to stop the vehicle. Air brakes are used in heavy commercial vehicles due to their reliability. They have several advantages for large multi-trailer vehicles:

- The air pressure is actually used to take the brakes off. With no air pressure the brakes are automatically fully applied from mechanical spring pressure in the brake drum system. Therefore, if the air system fails or has a leak the brakes are applied anyway.
- The supply of air is unlimited, so the brake system can never run out of its operating fluid, as hydraulic brakes can. Minor leaks do not result in brake failures.
- Air line couplings are easier to attach and detach than hydraulic lines; the risk of air getting into hydraulic fluid is eliminated, as is the need to bleed brakes when they are serviced. Air-brake circuits on trailers can be easily attached and removed.
- Air not only serves as a fluid for transmission of force, but also stores potential energy as it is compressed, so it can serve to control the force applied; hydraulic fluid is nearly incompressible. Air-brake systems include an air tank that serves as a reservoir so that the compressor isn't overloaded under repeated braking in a short space of time.
- Air brakes are effective even with considerable leakage, so an air-brake system can be designed with sufficient "fail-safe" capacity to allow the vehicle to carry on working even when leaking.
- The compressed air inherent in the system can be used for accessory applications that hydraulics are not appropriate for, such as air horns and seat adjusters, doors in case of buses and trolleybuses.

== Disadvantages ==
Although air brakes are considered the superior braking system for heavy vehicles (gross weight ~12 tonnes to 15 tonnes) which would overload hydraulic brakes, they also have the following disadvantages when compared to hydraulic braking systems:

- If the system fails or there is a split airline then the vehicle is immobilised as the brakes are stuck on. This can also make towing a broken vehicle harder because the mechanic must manually wind off the brakes to allow it to move again.
- Air brakes generally cost more.
- Air-brake systems compress air, which results in moisture that requires air dryers to remove, which also increases the price for air-brake systems and can contribute to higher maintenance and repair costs, particularly in the first five years. Defective air dryers lead to ice in the air-brake system in cold locations.
- In the US, commercial drivers are required to obtain additional training in order to legally drive any vehicle using an air-brake system. Non commercial drivers may not need a commercial license to drive an air-brake equipped vehicle if the vehicle would not otherwise require a commercial license. The Federal Motor Carrier Safety Administration (FMCSA), which regulates the trucking industry in the US, requires that drivers take their driving test in a vehicle equipped with air brakes. If the driver takes the test in a vehicle without air brakes, they will have a restriction placed on their license stating it is not valid on vehicles with air brakes. This is because:
  - Learning to operate air brakes smoothly has a learning curve, as they are difficult to operate smoothly.
  - Also, since air brakes must be operated differently from hydraulic systems, driving a vehicle with air brakes requires knowledge of proper maintenance. A driver is required to inspect the air pressurization system prior to driving and make sure all tanks are in working order. They may also be required to adjust the "slack" in the brake linkages on their trailers.
- In some Canadian jurisdictions, commercial drivers are required to obtain additional training in order to legally drive any vehicle using an air-brake system, as noted by the Insurance Corporation of British Columbia (ICBC). "Operating commercial vehicles or vehicles equipped with air brakes requires special knowledge and skill, and the cost of a mistake can be very high. When large vehicles are involved in crashes, the damage—to vehicles, cargo and human lives—can be catastrophic."
- Noise pollution: Ranging at 95–115 dB for a typical noise level range with air dryer purges resulting in levels closer to 115–120 dB able to cause immediate damage to hearing.

== See also ==
- Air brake (aircraft)
- ArvinMeritor
- Compression release engine brake
- Gladhand connector
- Knorr-Bremse
- Ozone cracking
- Polymer degradation
- Railway air brake
- WABCO Vehicle Control Systems
