= Piping and instrumentation diagram =

Detailed diagram in the process industry

A Piping and Instrumentation Diagram (P&ID) is a detailed diagram in the process industry which shows process equipment together with the instrumentation and control devices. It is also called as mechanical flow diagram (MFD).

Superordinate to the P&ID is the process flow diagram (PFD) which indicates the more general flow of plant processes and the relationship between major equipment of a plant facility.

== Contents and function ==
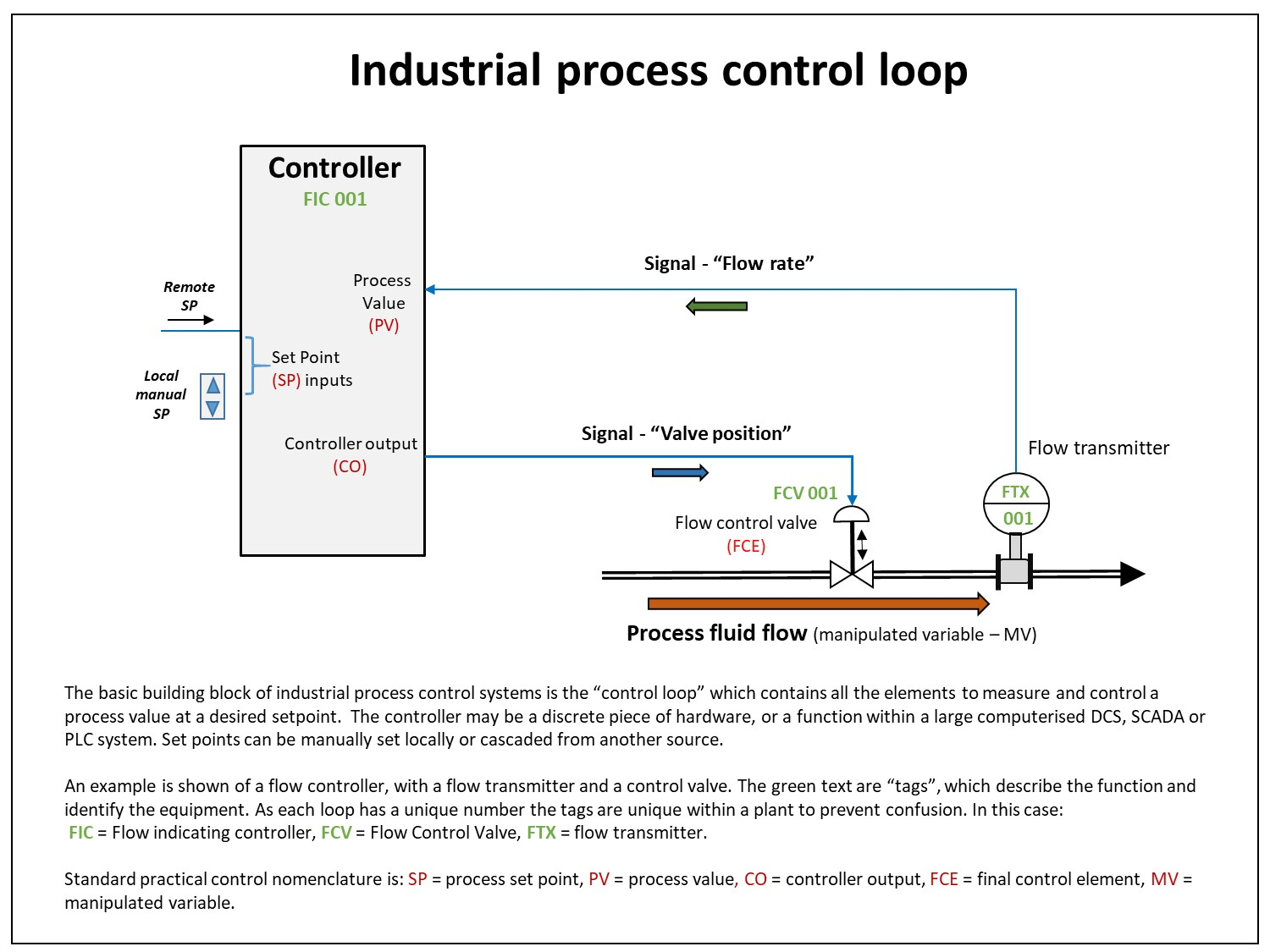
Example of a single industrial control loop; showing continuously modulated control of process flow.

Piping and instrumentation diagram of pump with storage tank. Symbols according to EN ISO 10628 and EN 62424.

A more complex example of a P&ID.

A piping and instrumentation diagram (P&ID) is defined as follows:

1. A diagram which shows the interconnection of process equipment and the instrumentation used to control the process. In the process industry, a standard set of symbols is used to prepare drawings of processes. The instrument symbols used in these drawings are generally based on International Society of Automation (ISA) Standard S5.1
2. The primary schematic drawing used for laying out a process control installation.

They usually contain the following information:

- Mechanical equipment, including:
  - Pressure vessels, columns, tanks, pumps, compressors, heat exchangers, furnaces, wellheads, fans, cooling towers, turbo-expanders, pig traps (see 'symbols' below)
  - Bursting discs, restriction orifices, strainers and filters, steam traps, moisture traps, sight-glasses, silencers, flares and vents, flame arrestors, vortex breakers, eductors
- Process piping, sizes and identification, including:
  - Pipe classes and piping line numbers
  - Flow directions
  - Interconnections references
  - Permanent start-up, flush and bypass lines
  - Pipelines and flowlines
  - Blinds and spectacle blinds
  - Insulation and heat tracing
- Process control instrumentation and designation (names, numbers, unique tag identifiers), including:
  - Valves and their types and identifications (e.g. isolation, shutoff, relief and safety valves, valve interlocks)
  - Control inputs and outputs (sensors and final elements, interlocks)
  - Miscellaneous - vents, drains, flanges, special fittings, sampling lines, reducers and swages
- Interfaces for class changes
- Computer control system
- Identification of components and subsystems delivered by others

P&IDs are originally drawn up at the design stage from a combination of process flow sheet data, the mechanical process equipment design, and the instrumentation engineering design. During the design stage, the diagram also provides the basis for the development of system control schemes, allowing for further safety and operational investigations, such as a Hazard and operability study (HAZOP). To do this, it is critical to demonstrate the physical sequence of equipment and systems, as well as how these systems connect.

P&IDs also play a significant role in the maintenance and modification of the process after initial build. Modifications are red-penned onto the diagrams and are vital records of the current plant design.

They are also vital in enabling development of;

- Control and shutdown schemes
- Safety and regulatory requirements
- Start-up sequences
- Operational understanding.

P&IDs form the basis for the live mimic diagrams displayed on graphical user interfaces of large industrial control systems such as SCADA and distributed control systems.

== Identification and reference designation ==
Based on STANDARD ANSI/ISA S5.1 and ISO 14617-6, the P&ID is used for the identification of measurements within the process. The identifications consist of up to 5 letters. The first identification letter is for the measured value, the second is a modifier, 3rd indicates passive/readout function, 4th - active/output function, and the 5th is the function modifier. This is followed by loop number, which is unique to that loop. For instance FIC045 means it is the Flow Indicating Controller in control loop 045. This is also known as the "tag" identifier of the field device, which is normally given to the location and function of the instrument. The same loop may have FT045 - which is the flow transmitter in the same loop.

Letter	Column 1 (Measured value)	Column 2 (Modifier)	Column 3 (Readout/passive function)	Column 4 (Output/active function)	Column 5 (Function modifier)
A	Analysis		Alarm		
B	Burner, combustion		User choice	User choice	User choice
C	User's choice (usually conductivity)			Control	Close
D	User's choice (usually density)	Difference			Deviation
E	Voltage		Sensor		
F	Flow rate	Ratio			
G	User's choice (usually gaging/gauging)	Gas	Glass/gauge/viewing		
H	Hand				High
I	Current		Indicate		
J	Power	Scan			
K	Time, time schedule	Time rate of change		Control station	
L	Level		Light		Low
M	User's choice				Middle / intermediate
N	User's choice (usually torque)		User choice	User choice	User choice
O	User's choice		Orifice		Open
P	Pressure		Point/test connection		
Q	Quantity	Totalize/integrate	Totalize/integrate		
R	Radiation		Record		Run
S	Speed, frequency	Safety (Non SIS (S5.1))		Switch	Stop
T	Temperature			Transmit	
U	Multivariable		Multifunction	Multifunction	
V	Vibration, mechanical analysis			Valve or damper	
W	Weight, force		Well or probe		
X	User's choice (usually on-off valve as XV)	X-axis	Accessory devices, unclassified	Unclassified	Unclassified
Y	Event, state, presence	Y-axis		Auxiliary devices	
Z	Position, dimension	Z-axis or Safety Instrumented System		Actuator, driver or unclassified final control element	

For reference designation of any equipment in industrial systems the standard IEC 61346 (Industrial systems, installations and equipment and industrial products — Structuring principles and reference designations) can be applied. For the function Measurement the reference designator B is used, followed by the above listed letter for the measured variable.

For reference designation of any equipment in a power station the KKS Power Plant Classification System can be applied.

== Symbols of chemical apparatus and equipment ==
Below are listed some symbols of chemical apparatus and equipment normally used in a P&ID, according to ISO 10628 and ISO 14617.

Symbols of chemical apparatus and equipment
	Pipe		Thermally insulated pipe		Jacketed pipe		Cooled or heated pipe
	Flexible connection		Hydraulic pump		Pump		Vacuum pump or compressor
	Fan		Axial fan		Radial fan		Dryer
	Jacketed mixing vessel (autoclave)		Half pipe mixing vessel		Pressurized horizontal vessel		Pressurized vertical vessel
	Packed column		Plate column		Furnace		Cooling tower
	Heat exchanger		Coil heat exchanger		Cooler		Plate & frame heat exchanger
	Double pipe heat exchanger		Fixed straight tubes heat exchanger		U-shaped tubes heat exchanger		Spiral heat exchanger
	Covered gas vent		Curved gas vent		Air filter		Funnel or tundish
	Steam trap		Viewing glass		Pressure reducing valve		Valve
	Gate valve		Control valve		Manual valve		Check valve
	Needle valve		Butterfly valve		Diaphragm valve		Ball valve
	Check valve		Back draft damper		Bag		Gas bottle
Globe valve	Globe valve	Valve3	3-way valve	P&ID Piston Compressor Symbol	Piston or reciprocating compressor	Spring safety valve	Relief valve
	Rupture disc		Turboexpander		Centrifugal pump		Reciprocating pump

=== Historical use ===
Prior to the advent of computer-aided design (CAD) in the late 1980s, P&IDs were drawn by hand. The drawing template shown below, actual size 225.mm by 111 mm, is typical of those used to draw P&IDs.

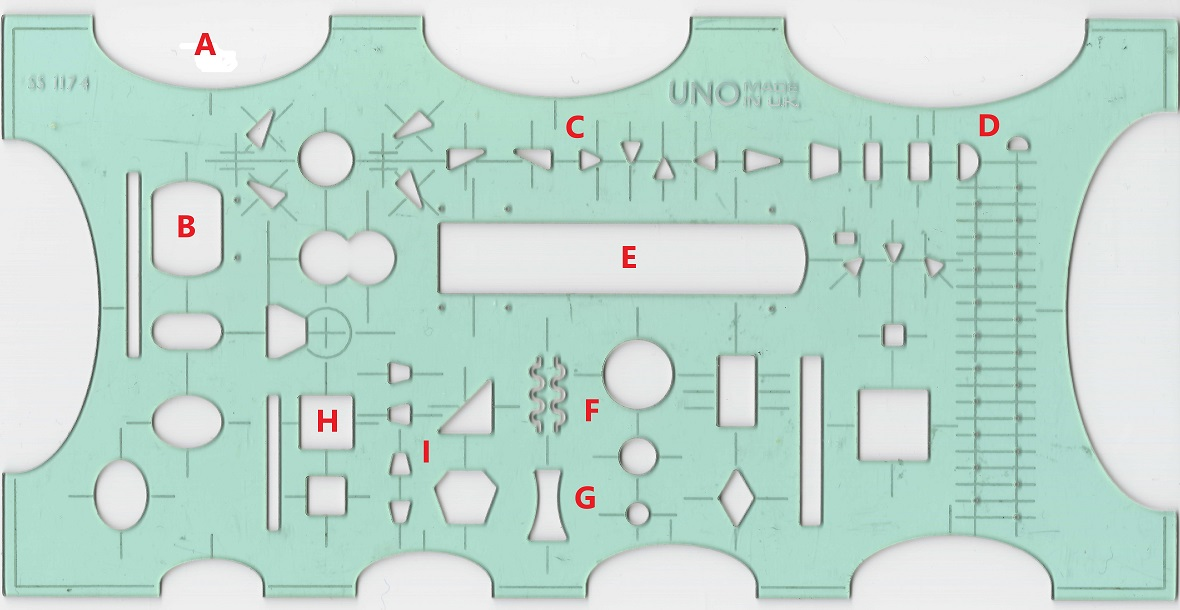

Piping and instrumentation diagram manual drawing template (1980s). Symbol key:

1. Vessel dished end
2. Motor driven pump or compressor and baseplate
3. Valves
4. Valve diaphragm actuator
5. Shell and tube heat exchanger
6. Flexible hose, bellows
7. Ejector
8. Machine driven pump or other device
9. Reducers

== See also ==
- Instrumentation in petrochemical industries
