= Demister (vapor) =

Removal of liquid droplets entrained in a vapor stream

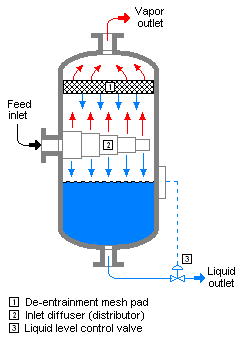
A typical, large-scale, vapor–liquid separator as used in oil refineries, petrochemical and chemical plants

A demister is a device often fitted to vapor–liquid separator vessels to enhance the removal of liquid droplets entrained in a vapor stream. Demisters may be a mesh-type coalescer, vane pack or other structure intended to aggregate the mist into droplets that are heavy enough to separate from the vapor stream.

Demisters can reduce the residence time required to separate a given liquid droplet size by reducing the volume and associated cost of separator equipment. Demisters are often used where vapor quality is important in regard to entrained liquids, particularly where separator equipment costs are high (e.g., high-pressure systems) or where space or weight savings are advantageous.

For example, in the process of brine desalination on marine vessels, brine is flash-heated into vapor. In flashing, vapor carries over droplets of brine, which have to be separated before condensing, otherwise the distillate vapor would be contaminated with salt. This is the role of the demister. Demisted vapor condenses on tubes in the desalination plant, and product water is collected in the distillate tray.

== See also ==
- Vapor–liquid separator
- Souders–Brown equation
- Vane type separator
- Vessel Internals
- Gas Processors Suppliers Association (GPSA)
