= Demister =

Demister may refer to:

- Demister (SCUBA), a product used to clear a scuba mask of fog
- Demister (vapor), a device that removes entrained liquid droplets from a gas stream
- Defogger or demister, a heating device fitted to rear windows of modern automobiles
