= Compressed air filters =

Compressed air filters, often referred to as line filters, are used to remove contaminants from compressed air after compression has taken place. When the filer is combined with a regulator and an oiler, it is called an air set. Air leaving a standard screw or piston compressor will generally have a high water content, as well as a high concentration of oil and other contaminants. There are many different types of filters, suitable for different pneumatics applications.

== Working principle ==
Unfiltered compressed air frequently contains dust, oil, rust, moisture and other harmful substances, and therefore requires filtration. In the first stage of filtration, the compressed air passes through a tube-shaped mesh filter, which creates a coalescence effect. Here bigger particles are adsorbed on the filter and the water will condense into larger droplets, which can then pass into the separation chamber. The compressed air is slowed down, which makes the particles condense on a honeycomb-like pad, allowing the water droplets to travel to the bottom of the drainage system and through an automatic or electric drain valve to the discharge. In the first filtration stage more than 95% of the water droplets, oil and large particles are removed. This practice is most common for removing water, but is also used for removing oil.

In the second filtration stage, the air is passed through a fiber filter. This process generates thousands of small vortices and other disturbances that cause the airflow to be less uniform. In doing this, the air comes into contact with more surface area of the filtration medium. Fine particulate is then captured because it will not fit through the small pores in the fiber filter. However, there will be a small pressure drop due to the added resistance to the airflow.

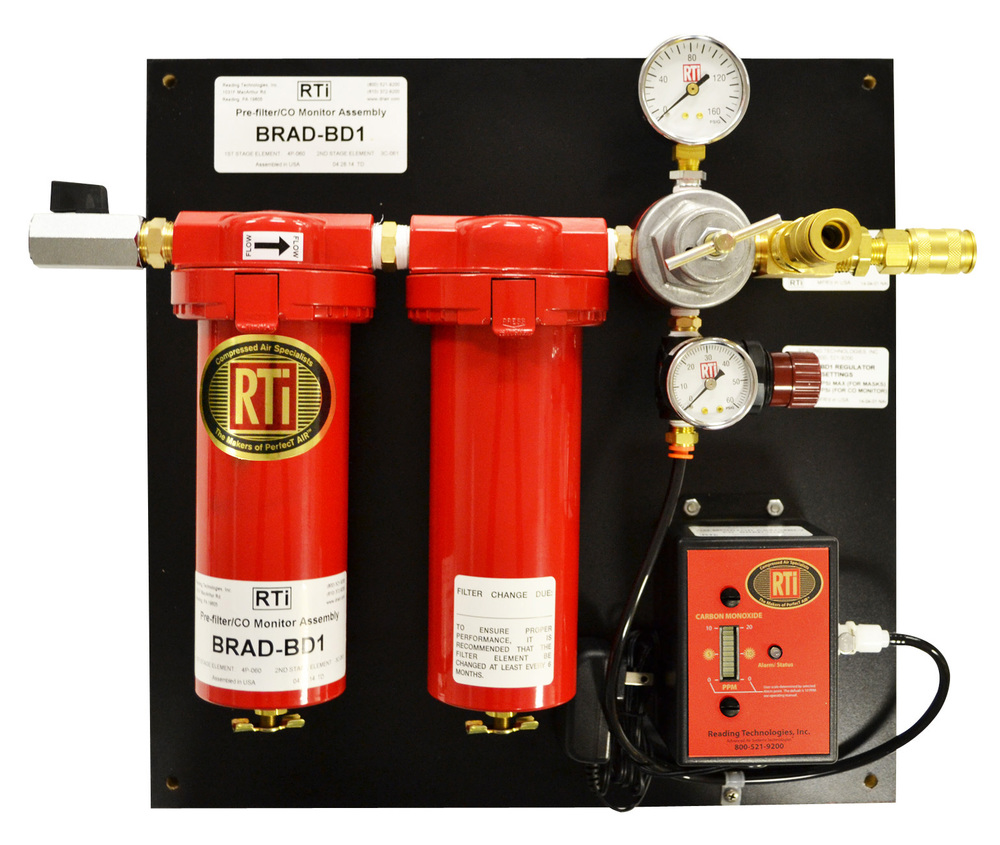
Reading Technologies Compressed air filter

== Types of filters ==
=== Particulate filters ===
Particulate compressed air filters are used to remove dust and particles from the air.

=== Activated carbon filters ===
Activated carbon filters utilize a composite carbon material to remove gases and odors from the air. They are used in factories where food is produced or for breathing gas.

=== Coalescing filters ===
High oil compressed air coalescing filters remove water and oil aerosols by coalescing the aerosols into droplets. This happens partially because of tortuous path and pressure drop. Coalescers remove both water and oil aerosols from the air stream, and are rated at particulate contamination through direct interception. Filtration of oil, water aerosols, dust and dirt particles to 0.01 μm the best achievable in industry.

=== Cold coalescing filters ===
Cold coalescing filters are coalescing filters operated at around 2 °C (35 °F), allowing them to be more effective at removing moisture.

=== Compressed intake filters ===
Intake filters are the first line of defense in filtering. These filters can remove contaminants down to 0.3 μm and can remove chemical contaminants.

== See also ==
- Compressed air dryer
