= P&ID =

P&ID may refer to:

- Process and Industrial Developments, a company in dispute with the Nigerian government
- Piping and instrumentation diagram
