= Vapor–liquid separator =

Device for separating a liquid-vapor mixture into its component phases

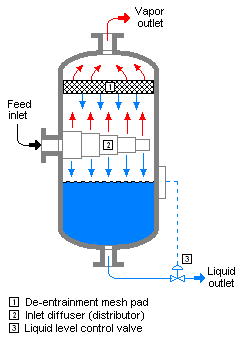
A typical vapor–liquid separator including commonly a de-entrainment pad and sometimes an inlet distributor

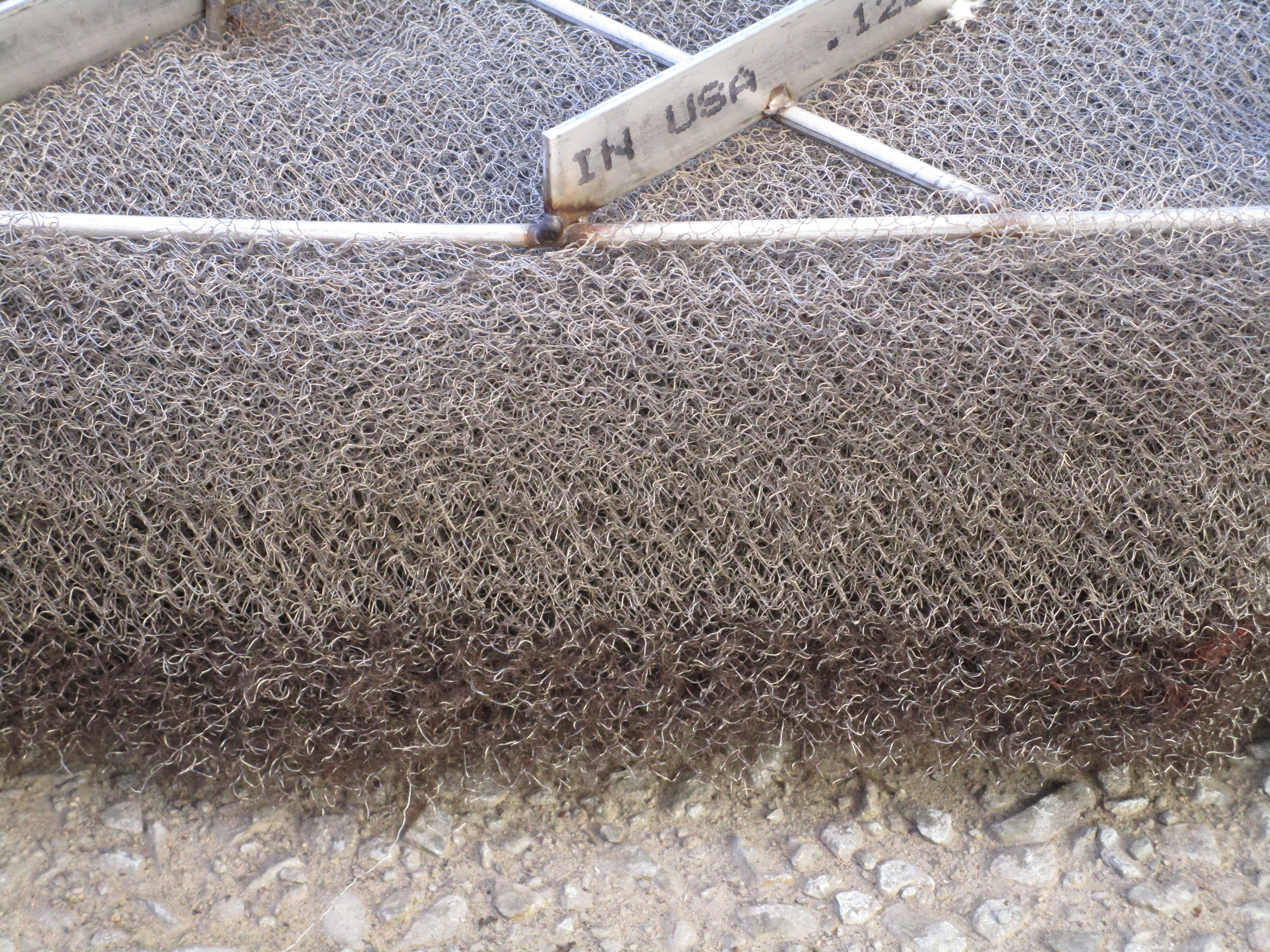
Alloy 20 mesh or demister pad used in sulfuric acid production

In chemical engineering, a vapor–liquid separator is a device used to separate a vapor–liquid mixture into its constituent phases. It can be a vertical or horizontal vessel, and can act as a 2-phase or 3-phase separator.

A vapor–liquid separator may also be referred to as a flash drum, breakpot, knock-out drum or knock-out pot, compressor suction drum, suction scrubber or compressor inlet drum, or vent scrubber. When used to remove suspended water droplets from streams of air, it is often called a demister.

== Method of operation ==
In vapor-liquid separators gravity is utilized to cause the denser fluid (liquid) to settle to the bottom of the vessel where it is withdrawn, less dense fluid (vapor) is withdrawn from the top of the vessel.

In low gravity environments such as a space station, a common liquid separator will not function because gravity is not usable as a separation mechanism. In this case, centrifugal force needs to be utilised in a spinning centrifugal separator to drive liquid towards the outer edge of the chamber for removal. Gaseous components migrate towards the center.

An inlet diffuser reduces the velocity and spreads the incoming mixture across the full cross-section of the vessel. A mesh pad in the upper part of the vessel aids separation and prevents liquid from being carried over with the vapor. The pad or mist mat traps entrained liquid droplets and allows them to coalesce until they are large enough to fall through the up-flowing vapor to the bottom of the vessel. Vane packs and cyclonic separators are also used to remove liquid from the outlet vapor.

The gas outlet may itself be surrounded by a spinning mesh screen or grating, so that any liquid that does approach the outlet strikes the grating, is accelerated, and thrown away from the outlet.

The vapor travels through the gas outlet at a design velocity which minimises the entrainment of any liquid droplets in the vapor as it exits the vessel.

A vortex breaker on the liquid outlet prevents the formation of vortices and of vapor being drawn into the liquid outlet.

=== Liquid level monitoring ===
The separator is only effective as long as there is a vapor space inside the chamber. The separator can fail if either the mixed inlet is overwhelmed with supply material, or the liquid drain is unable to handle the volume of liquid being collected. The separator may therefore be combined with some other liquid level sensing mechanism such as a sight glass or float sensor. In this manner, both the supply and drain flow can be regulated to prevent the separator from becoming overloaded.

== Applications ==
Vertical separators are generally used when the gas-liquid ratio is high or gas volumes are high. Horizontal separators are used where large volumes of liquid are involved.

A vapor-liquid separator may operate as a 3-phase separator, with two immiscible liquid phases of different densities. For example natural gas (vapor), water and oil/condensate. The two liquids settle at the bottom of the vessel with oil floating on the water. Separate liquid outlets are provided.

The feed to a vapor–liquid separator may also be a liquid that is being partially or totally flashed into a vapor and liquid as it enters the separator.

A slug catcher is a type of vapor–liquid separator that is able to receive a large inflow of liquid at random times. It is usually found at the end of gas pipelines where condensate may be present as slugs of liquid. It is usually a horizontal vessel or array of large diameter pipes.

The liquid capacity of a separator is usually defined by the residence time of the liquid in the vessel. Some typical residence times are as shown.

Liquid residence time
Application	Residence time, minutes
Natural gas – condensate separation	2–4
Fractionator feed tank	10–15
Reflux drum	5–10
Fractionator sump	2
Amine flash tank	5–10
Refrigeration surge tank	5
Heating medium surge tank	5–10

== Where vapor–liquid separators are used ==
Vapor–liquid separators are very widely used in a great many industries and applications, such as:

- Oil refineries
- Offshore platforms
- Natural-gas processing plants (NGL)
- Petrochemical and chemical plants
- Refrigeration systems
- Air conditioning
- Compressor systems
- Gas pipelines
- Steam condensate flash drums
- Geothermal power plants
- Combined cycle power plants
- Flare stacks
- Soil vapor extraction
- Paper mills
- Liquid ring pumps

== Preventing pump damage ==
In refrigeration systems, it is common for the system to contain a mixture of liquid and gas, but for the mechanical gas compressor to be intolerant of liquid.

Some compressor types such as the scroll compressor use a continuously shrinking compression volume. Once liquid completely fills this volume the pump may either stall and overload, or the pump chamber may be warped or otherwise damaged by the fluid that can not fit into a smaller space.

== See also ==
- Flash evaporation
- Vapor-compression refrigeration
- Souders–Brown equation (for sizing vapor–liquid separators)
- Steam drum
