= Symbolic language (engineering) =

Standardised system of marks, symbols, etc. used in an engineering discipline

In engineering, a symbolic language is a language that uses standard symbols, marks, and abbreviations to represent concepts such as entities, aspects, attributes, and relationships.

Engineering symbolic language may be used for the specification, design, implementation, management, operation, and execution of engineered systems.

Communication using precise, concise representations of concepts is critical in engineering. The Nuclear Principles in Engineering book begins with a quote on symbolic language from Erich Fromm, and its power to express and depict associations. The engineering employs symbolic language in a way that is not purely text-based and not purely image-based to represent and communicate knowledge.

Examples in chemical engineering include the symbolic languages developed for process flow diagrams and for piping and instrumentation diagrams (P&IDs).

In electrical engineering, examples include the symbolic languages developed for network diagrams used in computing.

Ladder logic was originally a written symbolic language for the design and construction of programmable logic control (PLC) operations in mechanical and control engineering.

== See also ==
- Electronic symbol
- Engineering drawing
- Engineering drawing abbreviations and symbols
- List of symbols
- Mathematical Alphanumeric Symbols
- Notation (general)
- Symbolic language (other)
