= Symbolic language (mathematics) =

Language using characters or symbols

In mathematics, a symbolic language is a language that uses characters or symbols to represent concepts, such as mathematical objects, operations, and statements, and the entities or operands on which the operations are performed.

== See also ==
- Formal language
- Language of mathematics
- Glossary of mathematical symbols
- Mathematical Alphanumeric Symbols
- Mathematical notation
- Notation system
- Symbolic language (disambiguation)
