= ISO 10628 =

Diagrams for the chemical and petrochemical industry

ISO 10628 Diagrams for the chemical and petrochemical industry specifies the classification, content, and representation of flow diagrams. It does not apply to electrical engineering diagrams. ISO 10628 consists of the following parts:

- Part 1: Specification of Diagrams (ISO 10628-1:2014)
- Part 2: Graphical Symbols (ISO 10628-2:2012)

This document supersedes ISO 10628:2000 and ISO 10628:1997.

== General principles ==
common elements of flow charts consist of:

- Block diagrams
- Process flow diagrams
- Piping and instrumentation diagrams (P&ID)

== Symbols ==
Symbols in ISO 10628-2
Symbols in groups 1 - 2

Symbols in groups 3 - 5

Symbols in groups 6 - 9

Symbols in groups 10 - 17

Symbols in groups 18 - 20

Symbols in groups 21 - 25

Symbols in groups 26 - 29

== See also ==
- Process flow diagram
- ISO 14617, Graphical symbols for diagrams
- ISO 15519, Specification for diagrams for process industry
