= Vortex breaker =

Device to prevent formation of a vortex at an outlet from a container

A vortex breaker is a device used in engineering to stop the formation of a vortex when a fluid (liquid or gas) is drained from a vessel such as a tank or vapor–liquid separator. The formation of vortices can entrain vapor in the liquid stream, leading to poor separation in process steps such as distillation or excessive pressure drop, or causing cavitation of downstream pumps. Vortices can also re-entrain solid particles previously separated from a gas stream in a solid-gas separation device such as a cyclone.

== Design ==
Many different designs of vortex breaker are available. Some use radial vanes or baffles around the liquid exit to stop some of the angular velocity of the liquid. The "floor grate" design uses a system of grating similar to the metal floor of a catwalk. Different authors give different rules of thumb for vortex breaker design.

== See also ==
- Vortex generator
