= Symbolic language =

A symbolic language is a method of communication that uses characters or images to represent concepts.

Symbolic language may refer to:

- Symbolic language (art)
- Symbolic language (engineering)
- Symbolic language (literature)
- Symbolic language (mathematics)
- Symbolic language (programming)
