= Vapor-tight tank =

Oilfield equipment to store and vent gas

A vapor-tight tank is a piece of portable onshore oil production equipment designed to store crude oil and convey oil vapors to a flare stack.

Vapor-tight tanks are horizontal vessels that can usually hold up to 14.7 pounds per square inch (gauge) (1.01 bar(g)). They use that pressure to force oil vapors to the flare. Connection to a flare allows these systems to be operated in situations with a high hydrogen sulfide content. In fact, their original intended use was sour crude oil production. The first vapor-tight tanks were constructed from used crude oil tank cars by Tornado Technologies.

Vapor-tight tanks are frequently packaged with an integral separator, flare stack, and other equipment to form a complete single-well battery. Because of their small size and portability, they are mostly used in temporary production of oil wells.

Canadian regulations consider that vapor-tight tanks are process vessels, rather than storage tanks, so tankage spacing and secondary containment provisions are not applicable.
