= Relay valve =

Valve to remotely operate pneumatic brakes

A relay valve is an air-operated valve typically used in air brake systems to remotely control the brakes at the rear of a heavy truck or semi-trailer in a tractor-trailer combination. Relay valves are necessary in heavy trucks in order to speed-up rear-brake application and release, since air takes longer to travel to the rear of the vehicle than the front of the vehicle, where the front service brakes, foot-valve, parking-control valve, and trailer-supply valve (if applicable) are located.

Without relay valves, it would take too long for sufficient air to travel from the brake pedal valve to the rear of the truck or trailer in order to apply the rear service brakes concurrently with the front service brakes, resulting in a condition known as brake lag. To correct this condition on a long-wheel-base vehicle, a relay valve is installed near the rear service brake chambers. In tractors as well as straight-trucks, a remote air-supply is provided in the form of a large diameter pipe connected between the primary reservoir and the relay valve for remote service brake application.

In a truck’s air brake system, relay valves get a signal when a driver presses the pedal, which then opens the valve and allows air to enter the brake chamber via air inlet. The diaphragm gets pushed, then the rod, then the slack adjuster which twists to turn the brake camshaft. Next, it moves the disc, wedge or s-cam, which pushes the brake shoes and lining, creating friction. This friction slows and eventually stops the brake drum’s turning, which stops the wheel.

== Trailers ==
In trailers, this remote air-supply is in the form of a tank, which is charged whenever the emergency brakes are released via the red trailer-supply valve on the dashboard. In a dual-circuit air brake system, this tank actually receives its air from both the primary and secondary reservoirs of the tractor; the air from both of these reservoirs is merged via a two-way check valve. The two-way check valve is a pneumatic device that has two inputs and one output; each input is connected to one these reservoirs. Only the air that is at the higher pressure is allowed to pass through to the check valve's output, which then passes through the tractor-protection valve, and then travels onward towards the trailer's air-tank and spring brake valve via the red trailer-supply line (a.k.a., the emergency line); this releases the trailer's emergency brakes (a.k.a. spring brakes). The tractor-protection valve is a device that prevents air from being lost from the tractor's braking system in the event of the air-lines becoming separated or broken. The tractor's air-lines connect to the trailer's air-lines via metal connectors known as gladhands. The merged air from both reservoirs of the tractor prevents air-loss from only one tractor braking circuit from causing the trailer's spring brakes to automatically apply. This gives the driver more control, and prevents the vehicle from grinding to a halt in an unsafe location, such as in the middle of an intersection.

== Service brake relay valve ==
With a service brake relay valve installed, the hose that connects to the primary delivery-port output of the foot-valve becomes a control-line (i.e., The air from the foot-valve “dead ends” at the relay valve's control-port.). Only low-volume air-signals are required to travel back and forth between the foot-valve's delivery port and the relay valve's control port; therefore, the air-volume supplied by the delivery port is now only a tiny-fraction of what otherwise would have been required had the relay valve not been installed. This reduces the delay between the application of the front and rear brakes to only a fraction of a second. When the driver depresses the brake pedal, a small amount of air momentarily opens the relay valve's supply port, which then directs air from the remote air-supply directly to the rear service brake chambers, and quickly applies the rear service brakes. The pressure delivered to the service brake chambers in this manner will equal the control-pressure delivered by the foot-valve to the relay valve. When the driver partially or fully releases the brake pedal, the control-pressure delivered by the foot-valve decreases; this causes the relay valve's supply port to close, and its exhaust port to momentarily open, thus preventing a pneumatic short-circuit from occurring while the air exhausts from all rear service brake chambers.

In order to control the trailer service brakes, the merged outputs (i.e., merged via 2 two-way check valves connected in-series to give three inputs) of the foot-valve and trailer-hand-valve (if applicable) are directed through the tractor-protection valve, and onward towards the trailer relay valve via the blue service line. In tractors that are not equipped with a trailer hand valve, only the merged outputs of the foot-valve (i.e., via a single two-way check valve) are directed towards the trailer relay valve; however, the fact that the foot-valve's delivery-port outputs are still merged enables the trailer's service brakes to still be controlled even if there is failure within one braking circuit of the tractor.

== Spring brake relay valve ==
A spring brake relay valve works on the same principle as the service brake relay valve, although it has the opposite effect. This type of relay valve responds to a major drop in pressure at its control-port by opening its exhaust port, which causes the air from each spring brake chamber under its control to remotely exhaust, thus applying the spring brakes much-more-quickly than would otherwise be possible if the air were required to discharge via the yellow parking-control valve on the dashboard. In a dual-circuit air brake system, air from both the primary and secondary reservoirs is fed into the supply-port of the parking-control valve, as well as the supply-port of this relay valve; it is merged via yet another two-way check valve. The delivery-port output of the parking-control valve connects to the control-port of this relay valve; this enables the spring brakes to be controlled via this valve. The merged air from the parking-control valve prevents air-loss from only one braking circuit from causing the spring brakes to automatically apply. This gives the driver more control, and prevents the vehicle from grinding to a halt in an unsafe location. However, with this increased control, comes increased responsibility on the part of the driver: If air is lost from the primary circuit alone, the spring brakes must be manually applied by the driver via the parking-control valve; otherwise, the front service brakes may not be enough to stop the vehicle safely in an emergency—especially if the vehicle is heavily loaded, and/or traveling at a high-speed. In fact, the driver's failure to manually apply the spring brakes in this situation could lead to catastrophic failure of the front brakes due to overheating, since it could cause the front service brakes to exceed their design-limit for energy absorption. QR1C air valve speeds up the process, with anti compounding, meaning trailer and service brakes will function 1 second between each other. The relay valve's function is analogous to the transistor used in electronic circuits.

== Testing relay valves ==
Relay valves are tested for durability before use through a seat test with air. In pressure at 80 psig or more, a 2-inch or smaller relay valve should not be tested for less than 15 seconds under pressure or for less than 30 seconds if it is at 3 inches in size.
