= ISO 14617 =

ISO standard

ISO 14617 Graphical symbols for diagrams is a library of graphical symbols for diagrams used in technical applications. ISO 14617 consists of the following parts:

- Part 1: General information and indexes
- Part 2: Symbols having general application
- Part 3: Connections and related devices
- Part 4: Actuators and related devices
- Part 5: Measurement and control devices
- Part 6: Measurement and control functions
- Part 7: Basic mechanical components
- Part 8: Valves and dampers
- Part 9: Pumps, compressors and fans
- Part 10: Fluid power converters
- Part 11: Devices for heat transfer and heat engines
- Part 12: Devices for separating, purification and mixing
- Part 13: Devices for material processing
- Part 14: Devices for transport and handling of material
- Part 15: Installation diagrams and network maps

The standard is developed in cooperation with the International Electrotechnical Commission and has some common elements with IEC 60617 Graphical symbols for diagrams.

== History ==
- ISO 14617-1:2002 was published in September 2002.
- ISO 14617-1:2005 was published in July 2005.
- ISO 14617-1:2025 was published in March 2025.

== Parts ==
Part 1: General information and indexes is an introduction with information on registration numbers, rules for presentation and application, and an index to all symbols. The other parts contain the symbols, classified by type or application.

== See also ==
- Process flow diagram
- ISO 15519, Specification for diagrams for process industry
- ISO 10628, Diagrams for the chemical and petrochemical industry
