= Compressed air dryer =

Filter systems to reduce humidity of compressed air

Compressed air dryers are types of filter systems that are specifically designed to remove water in compressed air. The compression of air raises its temperature and concentrates atmospheric contaminants, primarily water vapor, resulting in air with elevated temperature and 100% relative humidity. As the compressed air cools down, water vapor condenses into the tanks, pipes, hoses and tools connected downstream from the compressor, which may be damaging. Therefore water vapor is removed from compressed air to prevent condensation from occurring and to prevent moisture from interfering in sensitive industrial processes.

Excessive liquid and condensing water in the air stream can be extremely damaging to equipment, tools and processes that rely on compressed air. For example, water can

- Cause corrosion in tanks and piping made out of steel, which may compromise its integrity
- Wash out lubricating oils from pneumatic tools
- Emulsify with the grease used in cylinders
- Clump blasting media and fog painted surfaces.
- Freeze into ice

There are various types of compressed air dryers. These dryers generally fall into two different categories: primary, which includes coalescing, refrigerated, and deliquescent; and secondary, which includes desiccant, absorption, and membrane. Their performance characteristics are typically defined by flow rate in litres per minute or standard cubic feet per minute (SCFM), and dew point expressed as a temperature.

== Applications ==
Water contamination is an inherent byproduct of compressing atmospheric air since all atmospheric air contains some water vapor. Compressed air systems often use air dryers located on the output of the air compressor or at various points throughout the distribution system. In most cases, the output of the compressor is processed through a primary, or system dryer. In cases where higher quality air is required, the air is further processed through a secondary, or polishing dryer.

== Characteristics ==
- Regenerative desiccant dryers typically deliver a dew point between −40 and −73 °C (−40 and −99 °F)
- Refrigerated dryers can usually only provide a dew point above 2 °C (36 °F)
- Deliquescent dryers deliver dew point suppression that fluctuates with air temperature. Typically this suppression is 11 °C (20 °F) below the compressed air temperature.

== Coalescing filters ==
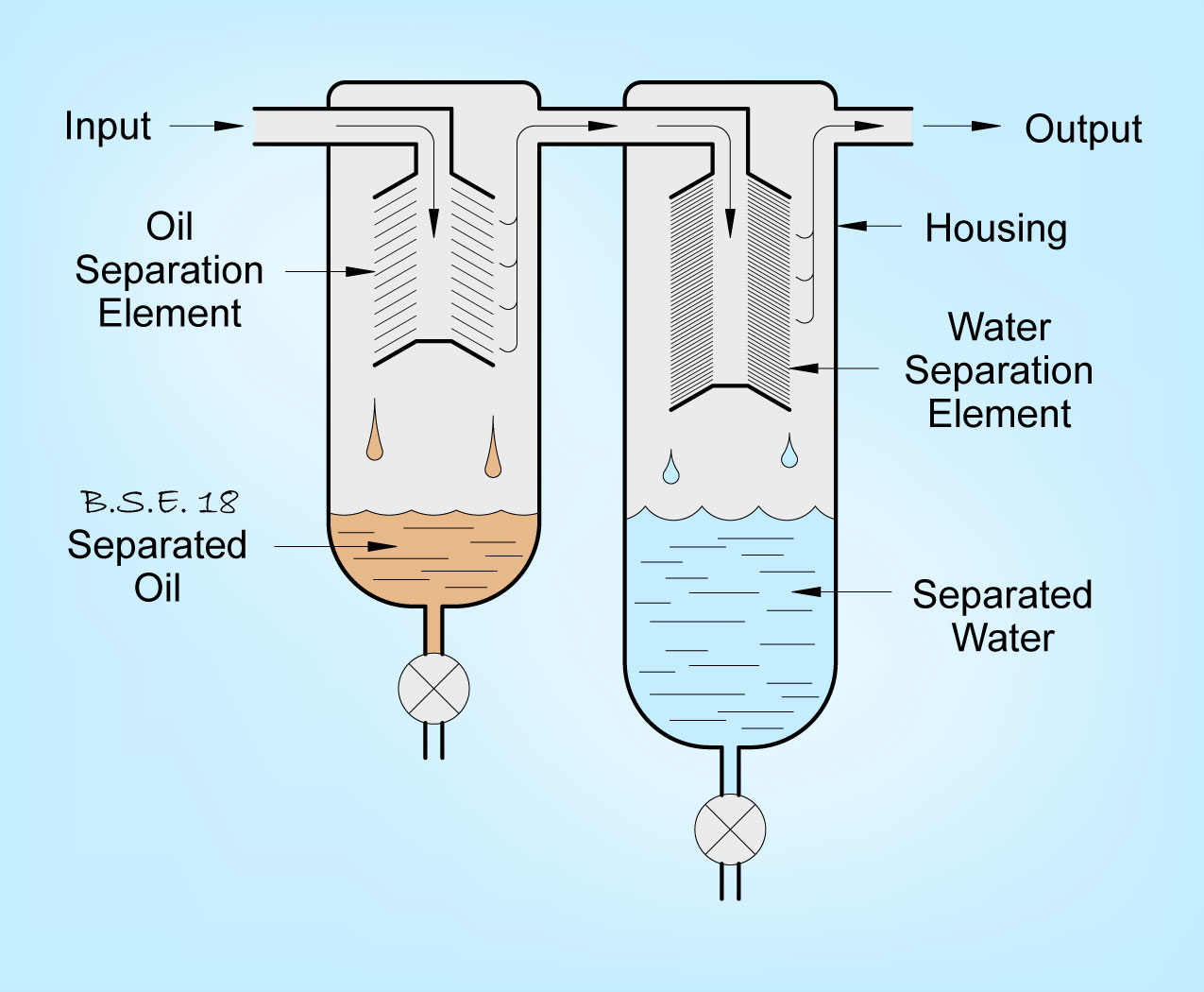
Schematic representation of a two-stage coalescing filter set.

Coalescing filters are not actually filters, rather they operate more as a consolidation element. The idea behind these devices is that the compressed air is forced through gaps or porosity within an otherwise solid element. These gaps and porosity are microscopic and small enough that water vapor wets to the internal surfaces. The liquid water that forms during the wetting process is forced through the media and drips down into a trap. The dry air travels up to and out of the discharge port.

There are two basic types of coalescing elements. The first type uses a cast material that is dominated with an internal microscopic lattice. The air is forced to flow through the lattice which, in turn, allows the water vapor to wet to the internal surfaces. The second type is generally referred to as a stacked plate element. In this case, fine discs are stacked with microscopic gaps between them. The air is forced to flow through the gaps which, in turn, allows the water vapor to wet to the internal surfaces.

In principle, a coalescing filter is an ideal way to separate water from the compressed air stream. Practically speaking, this is not the case. Coalescing elements are extremely sensitive to oil and particulate contamination and therefore would be better placed as a second stage dryer. However, the dew point performance of a coalescing filter places it in the primary category of compressed air dryers. In order to use coalescing filters as primary dryers, they are typically set-up in pairs. The first filter has an element with larger gaps that are designed to remove oil from the stream. The second filter uses a finer element that is intended to remove water vapor. Because of the sensitivity of the elements, coalescing filters are not particularly common. One area where these filters have found acceptance is with dental compressors. The way that dental compressors are designed and used makes a two-stage coalescing filter an almost ideal solution for water contamination in these systems.

== Refrigerated dryers ==
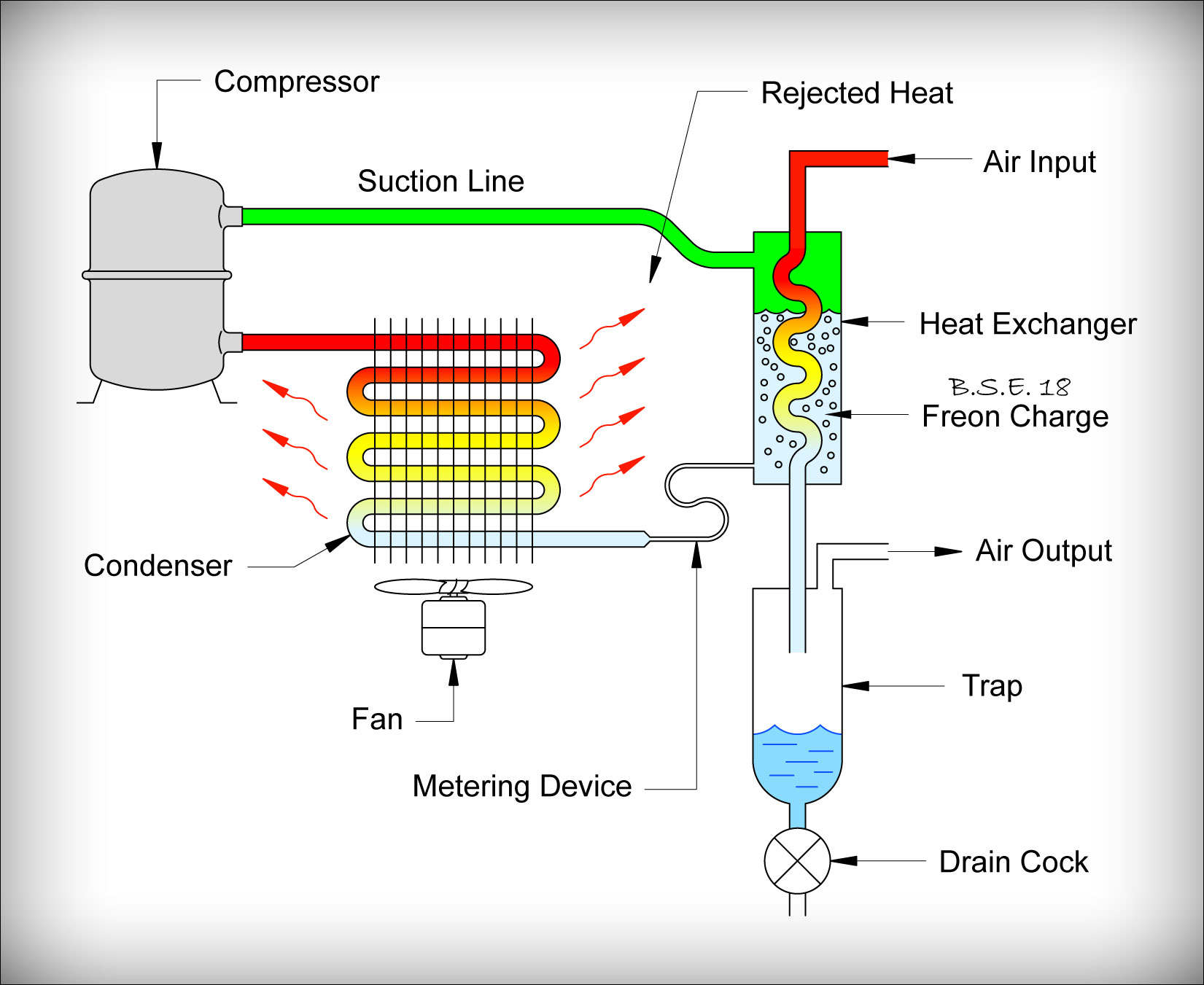
Basic schematic of a Freon-based refrigerated compressed air dryer

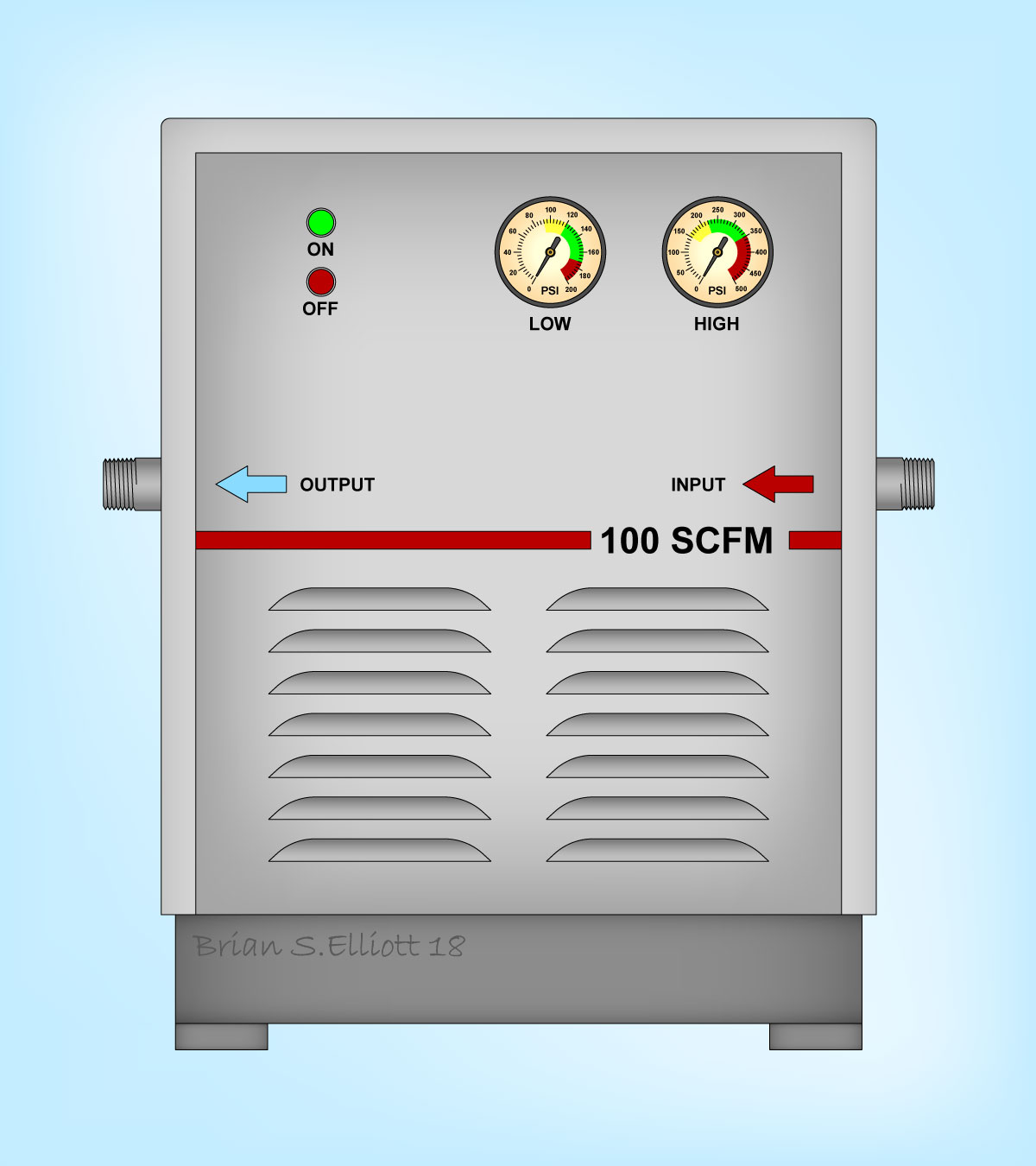
Illustration of a typical commercial Freon-based refrigerated compressed air dryer

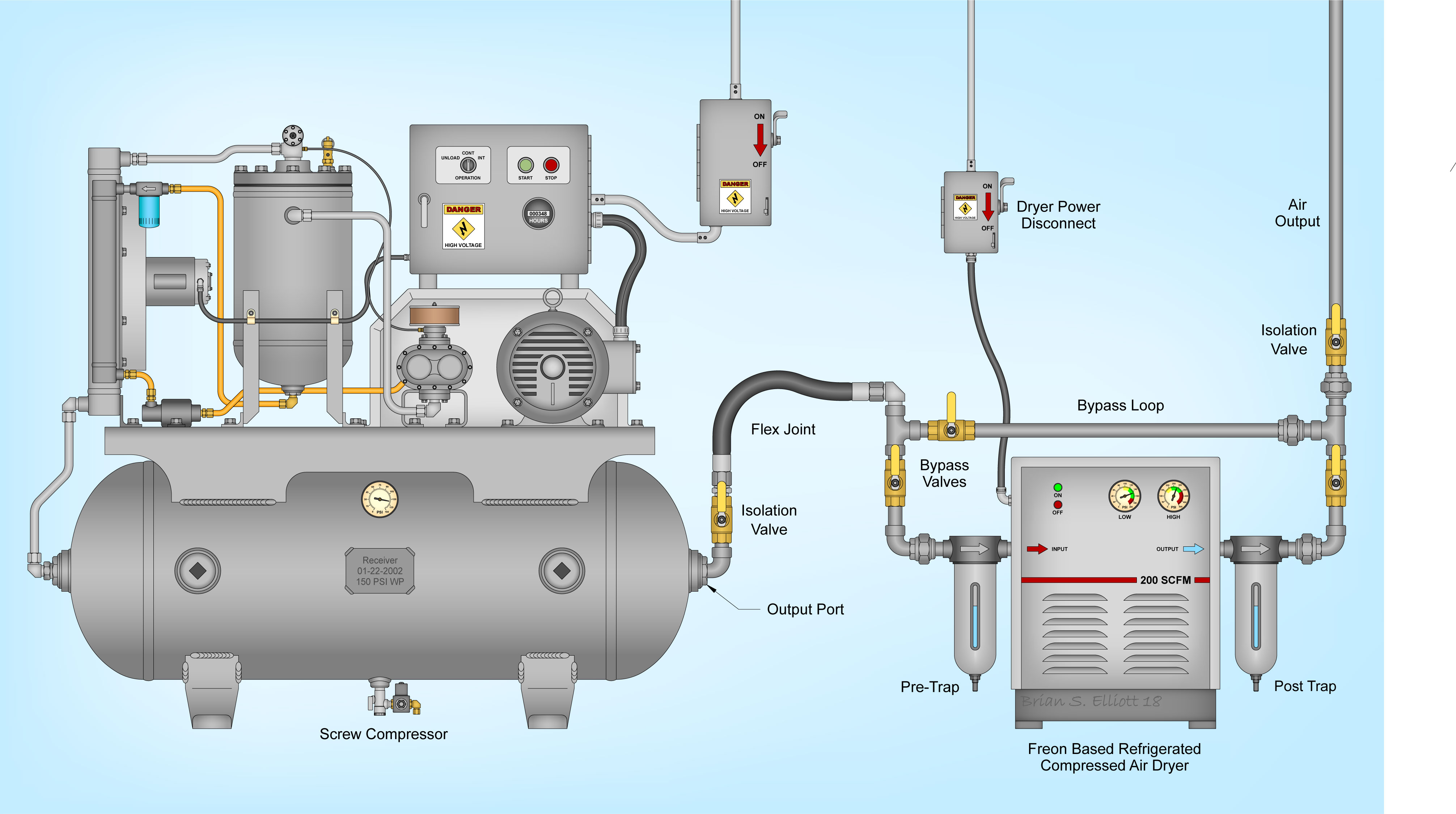
Rotary-screw air compressor equipped with a Freon-based refrigerated compressed air dryer

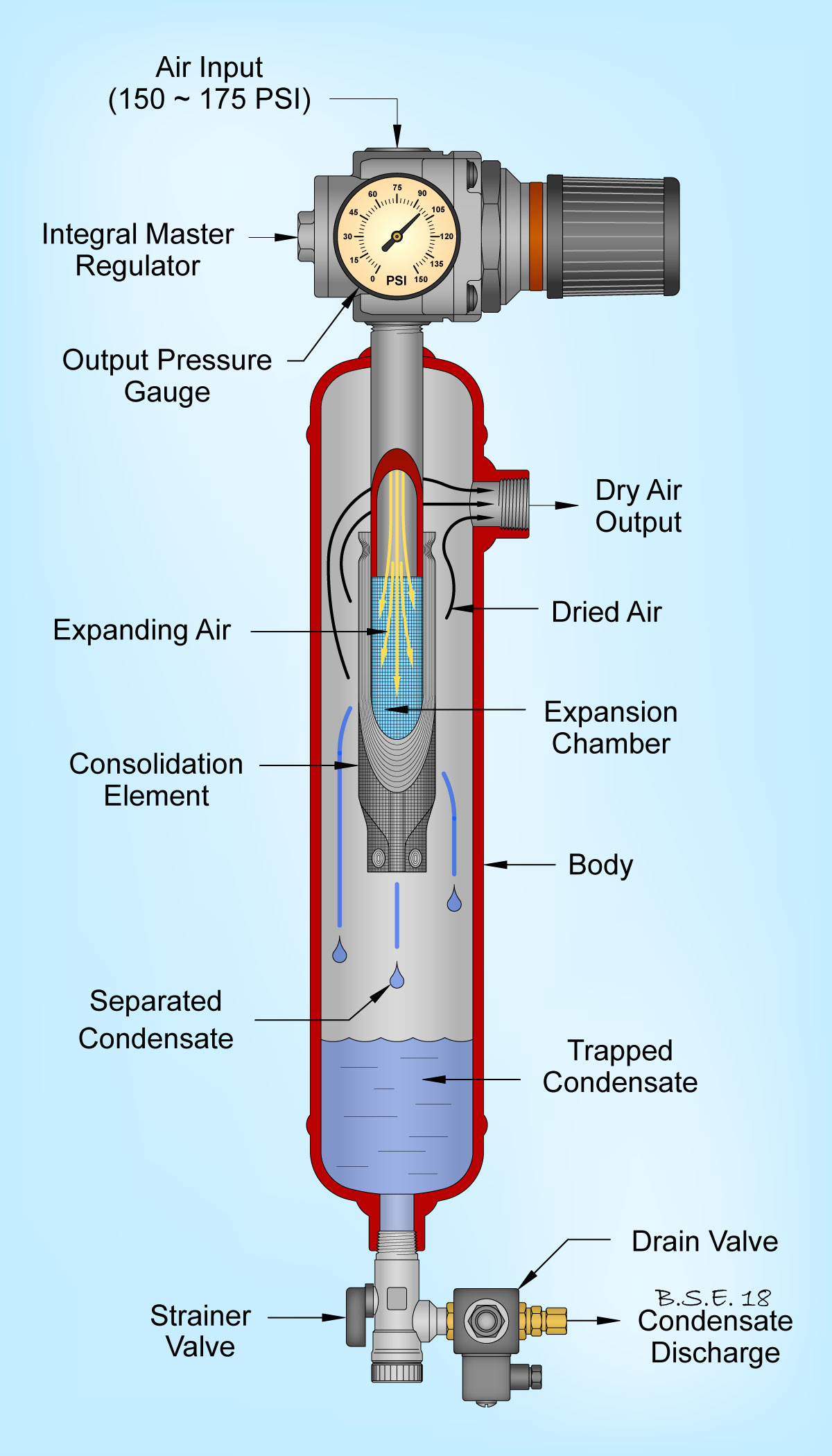
Sectional illustration showing the internals of a JT type compressed air dryer.

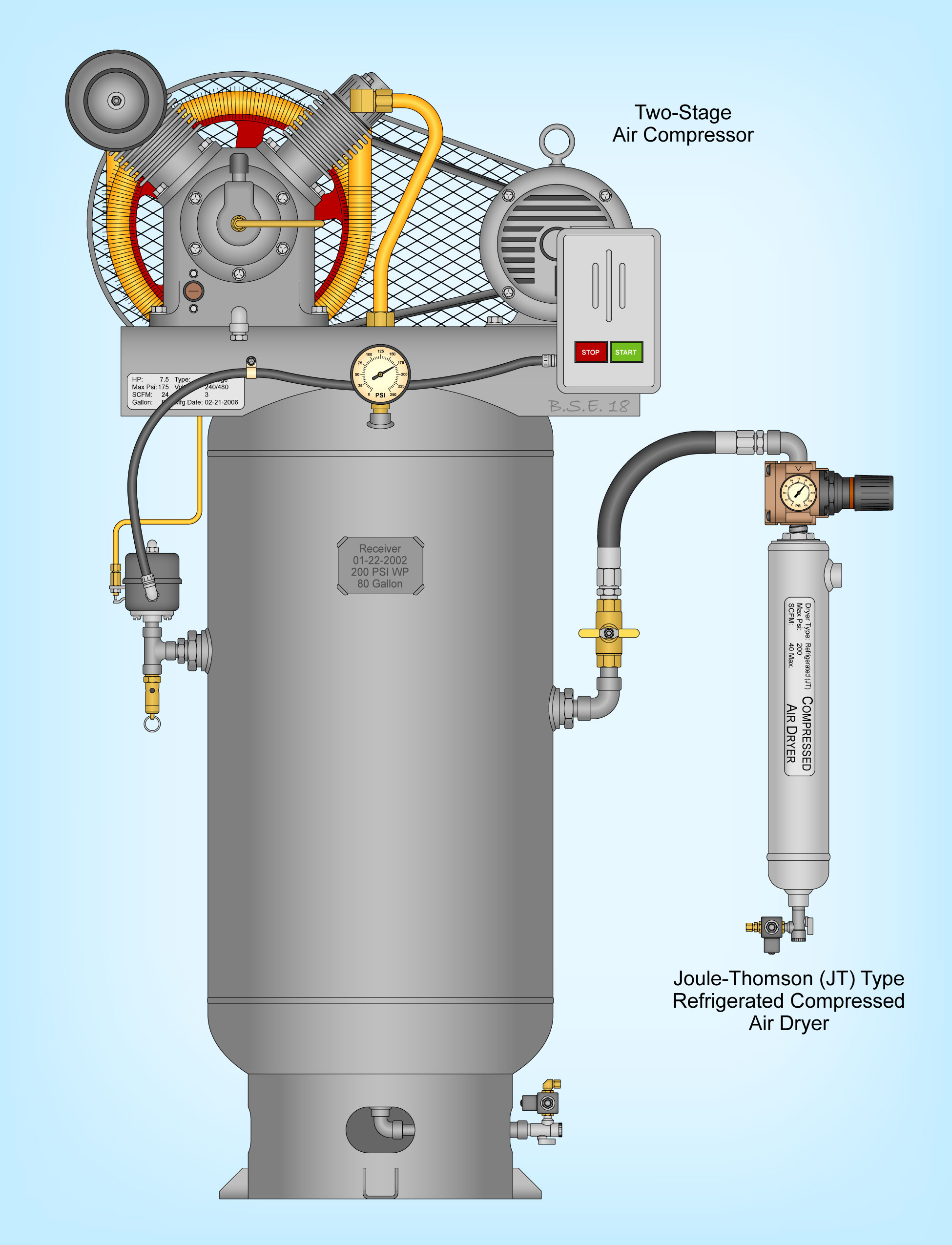
Two-stage air compressor equipped with a JT type refrigerated compressed air dryer.

Refrigerated dryers are the most common type of compressed air dryer. They remove water from the air stream by cooling the air to approximately 3 °C (37 °F) and effectively condensing out the moisture in a controlled environment. 3 °C is the realistic lower limit for a refrigerated dryer because a lower temperature runs the risk of freezing the separated water. They are typically specified as primary dryers and generally produce air quality that is appropriate for approximately 95% of all compressed air applications.

Refrigerated dryers employ two heat exchangers, one for air-to-air and one for air-to-refrigeration. However, there is also a single TRISAB heat exchanger that combines both functions. The compressors used in this type of dryer are usually of the hermetic type and the most common gas used is R-134a and R-410a for smaller air dryers up to 2,800 L/min (100 ft^{3}/min). Older and larger dryers still use R-22 and R-404a refrigerants. The goal of having two heat exchangers is that the cold outgoing air cools down the hot incoming air and reduces the size of compressor required. At the same time the increase in the temperature of outgoing air prevents re-condensation.

Some manufacturers produce "cycling dryers". These store a cold mass that cools the air when the compressor is off. When the refrigeration compressor runs, the large mass takes much longer to cool, so the compressor runs longer, and stays off longer. These units operate at lower dew points, typically in the 1.5 to 4.5 °C (34.7 to 40.1 °F) range. When selected with the optional "cold coalescing filter", these units can deliver compressed air with lower dew points. Non-cycling dryers use a hot gas by pass valve to prevent the dryer from icing up.

Some manufacturers produce "cold coalescing filters" that are positioned inside of the air dryer at the point of the lowest air temperature (the point at which maximum condensation has occurred).

Refrigerated dryers are generally manufactured in one of two different ways, Freon based units and Joule-Thomson based units.

=== Freon-based refrigerated compressed-air dryers ===
These dryers derive their cooling from a closed cycle refrigeration system based around one of three commercial refrigerants, R-22, R-134a or R410a. The refrigeration system these dryers use is similar to home and commercial air conditioning systems. The schematic shown to the right illustrates a typical Freon-based refrigerated compressed air dryer.

Freon-based refrigerated compressed air dryers generally consist of a heat exchanger that is similar to a water cooled after cooler. Instead of using water as the coolant, liquid CFC fills the shell of the heat exchanger. The liquid CFC is maintained at a pressure that allows it to boil at 3 °C (37 °F). After the CFC boils, the vapor is drawn through the suction line into a compressor, which compresses the CFC to a high pressure and high temperature. The high pressure/temperature CFC is cooled in the condenser and relaxes into its liquid state. The liquid is reintroduced into the heat exchanger via the metering device and a closed refrigeration cycle is formed. When the compressed air passes through the heat exchanger, it is cooled to the temperature of the boiling CFC. As the compressed air is cooled, it loses its ability to retain moisture and the water vapor condenses onto the inside of the exchanger tube.

Variations on this basic design include units equipped with reheating exchangers, which are intended to improve efficiency. In these cases, the cooled compressed air is reheated by the incoming air.

Oil and water vapors in compressed air must have cooled to their dew point (become aerosols) before the coalescing filter can operate effectively. Refrigerated compressed air dryers typically have a remaining oil content of 6 mg/m^{3}. Refrigerated compressed air dryers with internal cold coalescing filters are rated to leave the remaining oil content as low as 0.008 mg/m^{3}, which is far less than coalescing filters that are downstream of air dryers, because the cooled compressed air is reheated by the incoming air. Larger refrigerant dryers have air-to-air heat exchanger between warm incoming air and chilled outgoing air. Cooled oil and water fogs coalesce much better in a coalescing filter at the cold temperatures than one in the warmer oil and water vapors located downstream of the air dryer air-to-air heat exchanger.

==== Compressed Air Coalescing Filter Performance ====
Type	Location	PPM	mg/m^{3}	Temperature, typical	Solid particles of this size and larger are captured (µm)
Cold	Inside	0.006	< 0.01	2 to 6 °C (36 to 42 °F)	0.01
General Purpose	After	0.4	0.5	24 to 38 °C (75 to 100 °F)	1.0
Standard	After	3.6	4.0	24 to 38 °C (75 to 100 °F)	3.0

Coalescing Filters collect liquids and aerosols, not vapors, see the Mechanical Coalescers section at Coalescer. In the table above, the location means where the Coalescing Filter is relative to Refrigerated Air Dryer. 1 mg/m^{3} is a weight of oil in a volume of air and is approximately equal to 0.83 ppm by weight.

High temperature dryers are equipped with an additional pre-cooler that removes excess heat via a forced air system. These units are designed to allow excessively hot compressed air to be effectively dried. Compressed air temperatures in excess of 38 °C (100 °F) are very common in southern climates, mining operations, steel mills, shipboard, etc. In areas and applications that demand operations in elevated ambient temperatures, high temperature dryers are a necessity.

Cycling dryers (also known as thermal mass dryers) use a thermal mass, usually a tank of water, to store the energy produced by the refrigeration system. The temperature of the water controls the refrigeration system through a thermostat. The compressed air passes through the thermal mass via a water cooled heat exchanger. The value of this type of configuration is that they normally produce more consistent cooling results.

=== Joule–Thomson (JT) based refrigerated compressed air dryers ===
JT type dryers are units that use the compressed air stream as their refrigeration element. High pressure compressed air, generally between 10 and 12 bar (150 and 175 psi) is fed into a pressure reducing valve on top of the dryer. The output of this valve, around 6 to 8 bar (90 to 120 psi), is directed into an expansion chamber which is surrounded with porous walls. As the air expands to a lower pressure, it becomes cold (based on the Joule-Thomson Effect) and its ability to retain moisture is reduced. The moisture is released from the air in the form of fog. The fog laden air then passes through the porous walls of the chamber. The micro-droplets of water that make up the fog wet to the porous material and collect until they form droplets that can be affected by gravity. The water then drops into a trap and the dried air travels up to and out of the discharge port. The drawback of the JT Dryer is that it can only be used with two-stage compressors. This is because a two-stage compressor derives its efficiency by pumping to a high pressure, 10 to 12 bars (150 to 175 psi). This pressure is inappropriate for the shop floor and must be dropped to 6 to 8 bar (90 to 120 psi). The JT Dryer takes advantage of this pressure drop to remove moisture from the compressed air stream through the inherent refrigeration based on the Joule-Thomson effect of the expanding air. Leveraging this pressure drop allows a JT dryer to produce the same relative dew points that Freon-based dryers produce.

== Deliquescent dryer ==
Deliquescent dryers typically consist of a pressure vessel filled with a hygroscopic medium that has a high affinity for water vapor. Practically speaking, these dryers are typically a large pressure vessel that is filled with salt crystals.

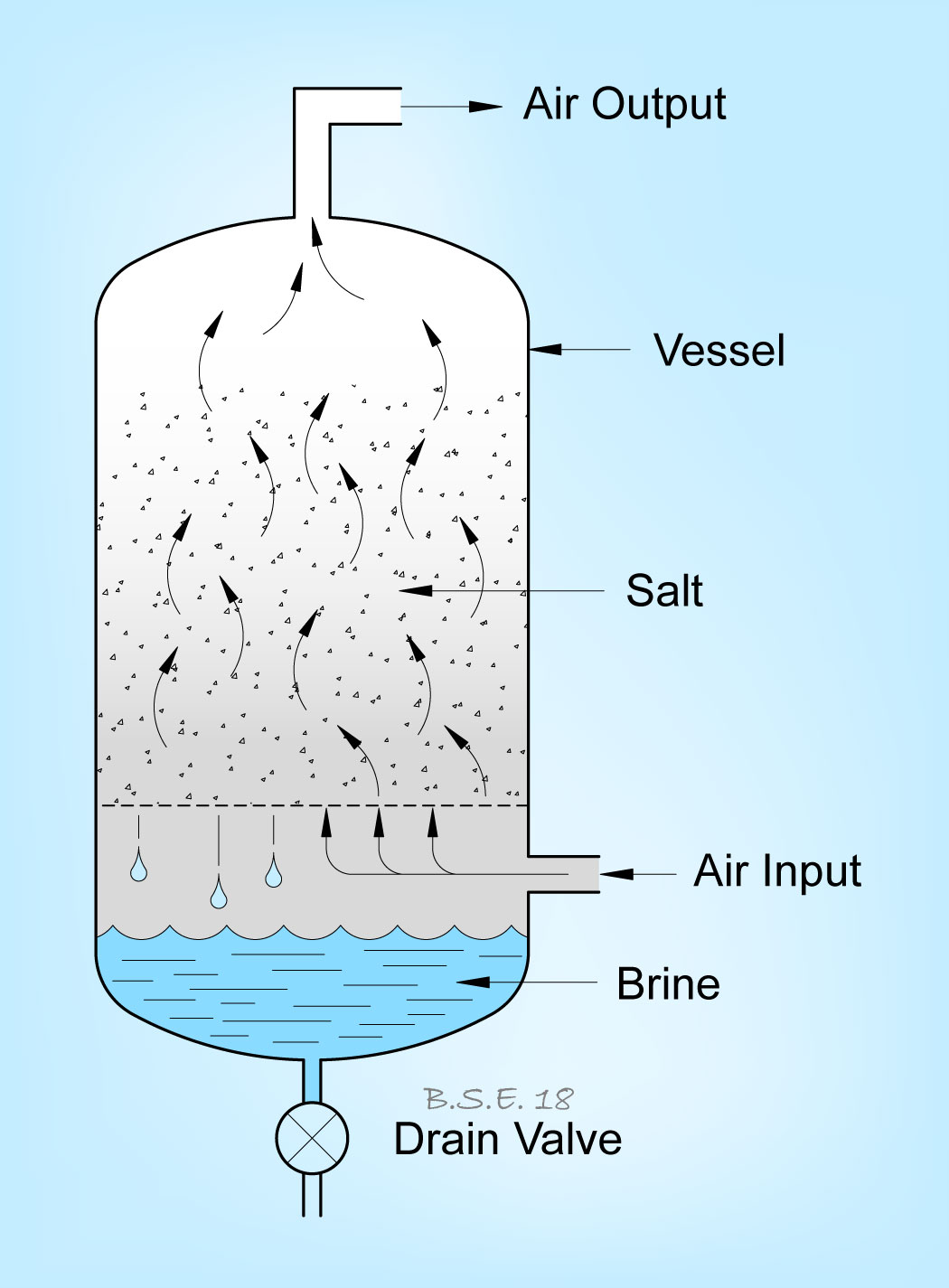
Schematic representation of a deliquescent compressed air dryer.

When water vapor comes in contact with the salt, it attaches and dissolves the media, or deliquesces. As liquid water builds on the salt crystals, brine is formed, which drains down and collects in the bottom of the vessel. Periodically, the brine must be drained and similarly, the media must be refilled. Typically, deliquescent dryers will produce a dew point suppression of 10 to 14 °C (18 to 25 °F).

On the plus side, these dryers are very simple, have no moving parts and do not require electrical power. However, they do not perform well with high temperature air streams or in high ambient temperatures. They are disproportionately large units which are filled with a corrosive substance. Their size and corrosive nature can present problems with any system that uses them. Because of this, these dryers are typically used only in specialty applications. Common applications often involve remote, hazardous, or mobile work sites. Deliquescent dryers are used for removing water vapor from compressed air, natural gas, and waste gases such as landfill gas and digester gas.

The performance of a deliquescent dryer, as measured by outlet dew point, is highly dependent on the temperature of the air or gas being processed, with cooler temperatures resulting in better performance

== Desiccant dryers ==
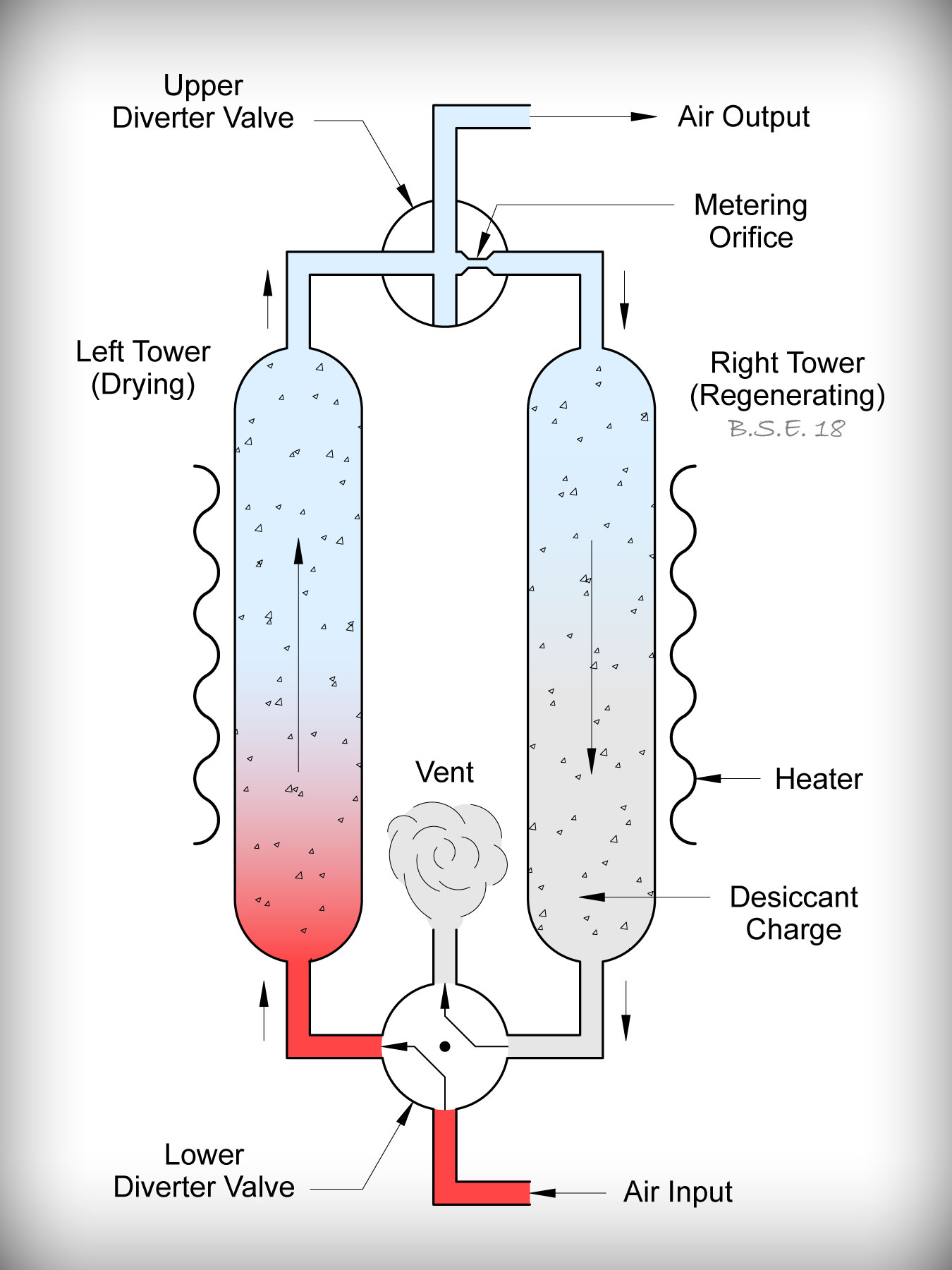
Schematic representation of a twin tower desiccant compressed air dryer.

Desiccant dryers, sometimes referred to as absorption dryers, operate by absorbing water vapor into a porous media with a high affinity for water. These types of dryers are also referred to as absorption systems or getters. Because these dryers get and hold the water, they are minimally effective as a first stage dryer. If a desiccant is used in this role, the media quickly becomes saturated and the effectiveness of the dryer is negated. Desiccant dryers are best applied in a second stage or polishing role. They are usually used down-stream from a refrigerated dryer or some other primary dryer. When applied as a second stage dryer, they can easily and reliably produce dew points in the sub zero range.

Desiccant dryers are typically supplied in two patterns, "Single Canister" and "Twin Tower" units. Single canister units have the outward appearance of a filter housing. However, they are filled with a granular media that must be periodically replaced. The media can be regenerated by baking it at a high temperature in accordance with the manufacturers' recommendations. Single canister desiccant dryers are typically installed in point-of-use applications. When applied as a second stage dryer, they can easily and reliably produce dew points in the sub-zero range.

A variation on the single canister desiccant dryer is the Toilet Paper filter. These types of filters provide the same basic function as a desiccant dryer except they use an ordinary roll of toilet paper as their absorption media. When the toilet paper becomes saturated, it is removed and replaced with a fresh roll. The popularity of these filters is primarily based around their low cost, convenience and effectiveness. These types of filters are often used in point-of-use roles.

Twin Tower, or regenerative desiccant dryers, have two vertical tanks filled with media. The compressed air is passed through a pressure vessel with two "towers" filled with a media such as activated alumina, silica gel, molecular sieve or other desiccant material. This desiccant material attracts the water from the compressed air via adsorption. As the water clings to the desiccant, the desiccant "bed" becomes saturated. When the media in the first tank becomes saturated, the air stream is automatically redirected through the second tank. The first tank is then heated while a portion of the dried air, referred to as the purge air, is back flowed through the tank and vented to atmosphere. This process dries, or regenerates, the media in the first tank and makes it ready for the next redirect. One of the most significant drawbacks of twin tower desiccant dryers is their use of the purge air. Typically, a twin tower desiccant dryer uses some 15 to 20% of its capacity to regenerate the opposite tank, making these dryers inefficient and costly to operate.

The task of the desiccant is to bring the pressure dew point of the compressed air to a level in which the water will no longer condense, or to remove as much water from the compressed air as possible. A standard dew point that is expected by a regenerative dryer is −40 °C (−40 °F); this means that when the air leaves the dryer there is as much water in the air as if the air had been "cooled" to −40 °C. Required dew point is dependent on application and −70 °C (−94 °F) is required in some applications. Many newer dryers come equipped with a dew dependent switching (DDS) which allows for the dryer to detect dew point and shorten or lengthen the drying cycle to fulfill the required dew point. Oftentimes this will save significant amounts of energy which is one of the largest factors when determining the proper compressed air system.

The regeneration of the desiccant vessel can be during three different methods:

- Heatless "pressure-swing" drying, which uses part of the dry compressed air coming from the other vessel to dry the desiccant in the vessel being regenerated at lower pressure. 17-20% purge rate
- Heated dryer, which uses a hot air blower, so there is no loss of compressed air. >7% Purge Rate.
- Heat of compression, which can only be used with an oil-free compressor.

== Membrane dryer ==
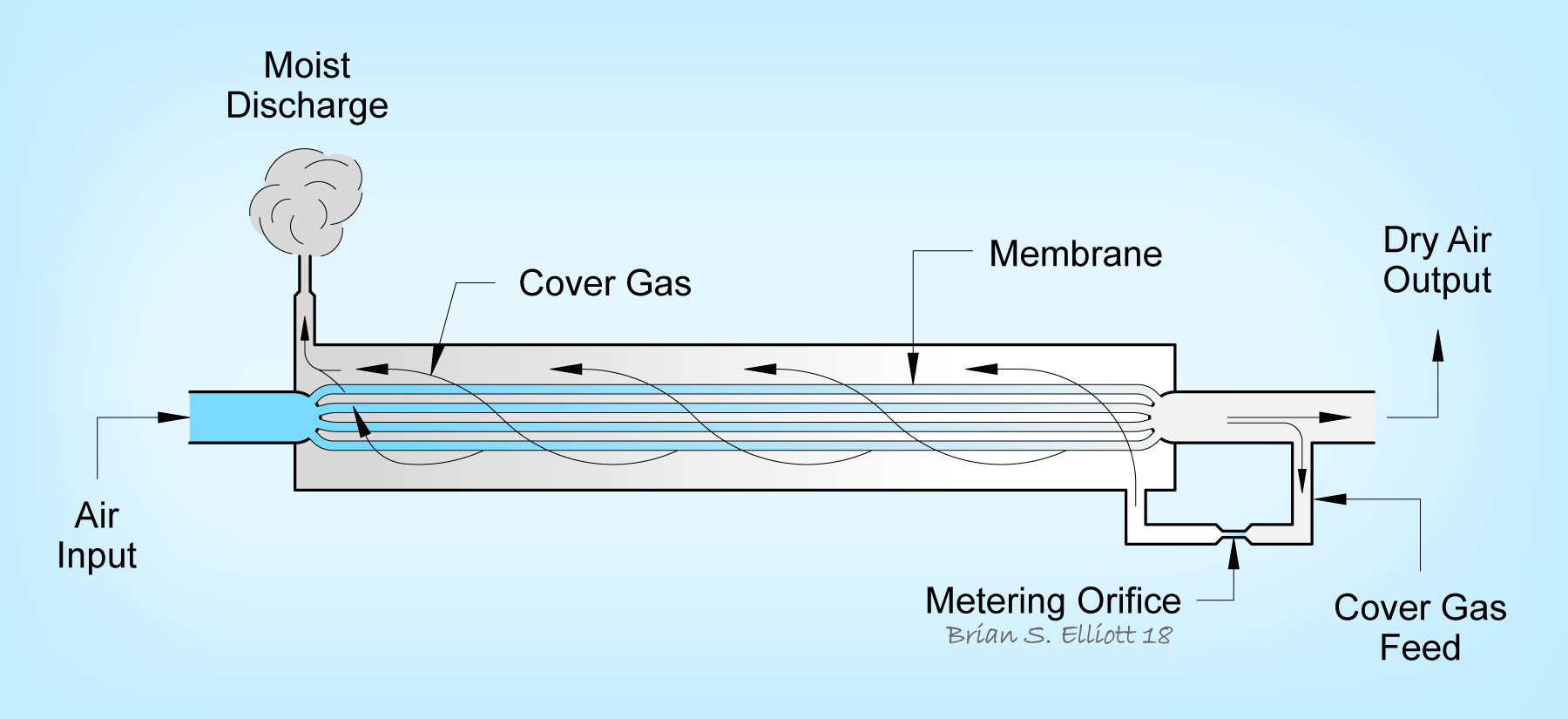
Schematic representation of a membrane type compressed air dryer.

Membrane dryer refers to a dehumidification membrane that removes water vapor. Industrial applications almost exclusively use these on compressed air. Membrane dryers operate on the principle of migration. The compressed air to be dried is passed over a membrane that has a high affinity for water vapor. The water vapor diffuses through the membrane and migrates through to the opposite or low pressure, side. Typically, a dry cover gas is flowed across the low pressure side and absorbs the water on the membrane. After absorbing the water, the cover gas is discharged to the atmosphere. The cover gas is generally taken from the output of the dryer. The membrane is typically a series of small tubes collected in a bundle within an outer housing, referred to as "hollow fiber" membranes. To reduce the energy for compressing the gas, newer configurations have been proposed using water vapor compressors. The best performing of those designs use two membrane modules, one on the air stream to be dried, and a second "rejection" membrane module where the dry cover gas flows. However, these designs may accumulate gas between the membranes, so configurations that cycle sweep gas between the membrane modules may work better for realistic membranes with imperfect selectivity between water and vapor.

Some dryers are non-porous, which means they only permeate water vapor. Non-porous membranes' drying power is only a function of flow rate, pressure. The sweep flow is strictly controlled by an orifice and is not a function of temperature. Porous membranes are modified nitrogen membranes and pass air as well, usually changing the composition of the compressed air by reducing the oxygen content. The only maintenance required is changing the prefilter cartridge twice a year. The performance of porous membranes are dependent on temperature as well as operating pressure and flow.

Membrane air dryers depress the incoming dew point. Membrane air dryers tend to change the dew point by a fixed increment, meaning that if the membrane air dryer can lower the dew point by 60 °C (140 °F), it will do this whether the incoming air has a dew point of 50 °C (122 °F) or 10 °C (50 °F). The pressure of incoming air also affects the ability of the membrane to dry the incoming air, and a higher inlet pressure will typically yield a larger drop in dew point than a lower inlet pressure. This is largely due to the increased partial pressure differential between the gas-water mixture on the wet side and dry side of the membrane.

Membrane air dryers are designed to operate continuously. Membrane air dryers are quiet, reliable and require no electricity to operate on compressed gas. If set up and operated properly, membrane dryers can produce extremely low dew points. For this reason they are very common in laboratories, medical facilities and specialty manufacturing environments where limited amounts of high quality compressed air is required. They are usually set up as a point-of-use dryer and provide the best service when used in a second or third stage role. The delicate nature of the equipment and how it is used makes them generally unsuitable for more mainstream or industrial applications. Membrane air dryers are used in pneumatic components, spray painting, laser plenum purge, air bearings, air spindles, medical equipment, air guns and pneumatic brakes for vehicles and trains.
