= Coalescer =

Machine that induces coalescence of droplets in an emulsion

A coalescer is a device which induces coalescence in a medium. They are primarily used to separate emulsions into their components via various processes, operating in reverse to an emulsifier.

Coalescers are of two main types: mechanical and electrostatic. Mechanical coalescers use filters or baffles to make droplets coalesce, while electrostatic coalescers use DC or AC electric fields (or combinations).

== Mechanical coalescers ==
Mechanical coalescers, which are the more common type of coalescers, operate by physically altering a droplet by mechanical means. They are commonly applied in the global oil and gas industries for the removal of water or hydrocarbon condensate. While coalescers by definition function as a separation tool for liquids, they are also used, and mistakenly referred to, as filters.

In the area of compressed air purification, coalescing filters are used to separate liquid water and oil from compressed air using a coalescing effect. Coalescence (physics) shows how coalescing filters operating at lower temperatures and high pressures work better. These filters additionally remove particles. The most commonly used media in this case is borosilicate micro-fiber.

In the Oil and Gas, Petrochemical and Oil Refining industries, liquid-gas coalescers are widely used to remove water and hydrocarbon liquids to less than 0.011 mW (plus particulate matter to less than 0.3 μm in size) from natural gas to ensure natural gas quality and protect downstream equipment such as compressors, gas turbines, amine or glycol absorbers, molecular sieves, PSA's, metering stations, mercury guard beds, gas fired heaters or furnaces, heat exchangers or gas-gas purification membranes.

In the natural gas industry, gas/liquid coalescers are used for recovery of lube oil downstream of a compressor. All liquids will be removed but lube oil recovery is the primary reason for installing a coalescer on the outlet of a compressor. Liquids from upstream of the compressor, which may include aerosol particles, entrained liquids or large volumes of liquids called "slugs" and which may be water and/or a combination of hydrocarbon liquids should be removed by a filter/coalescing vessel located upstream of the compressor. Efficiencies of gas/liquid coalescers are typically 0.3 μm (0.3 micron) liquid particles, with efficiencies to 99.98%.

Liquid-liquid coalescers can also be used to separate hydrocarbons from water phases such as oil removal from produced water. They have been also used in pyrolysis gasoline (benzene) removal from quench water in ethylene plants, although in this application, the constant changing of cartridges can lead to operator exposure to BTX (benzene, toluene and xylene), as well as disposal issues and high operating costs from frequent replacement.

== Electrostatic coalescers ==
Electrostatic coalescers use electrical fields to induce droplet coalescence in water-in-crude-oil emulsions to increase the droplet size. The squared dependence of droplet diameter in Stokes' law, increase the settling speed and destabilizes the emulsion. The effects on the water droplet arise from the very different dielectric properties of the conductive water droplets dispersed in the insulating oil. Water droplets have a permittivity that is much higher than the surrounding oil. Furthermore, water with dissolved salt is also a very good conductor. When an uncharged droplet is subjected to an AC electric field, the field will polarize the droplet, creating an electric field around the droplet to counteract the external field. As the water droplet is very conductive, the induced charges will reside on the surface. The droplet has no net charge but one positive and one negative side. Inside the droplet, the electric field is zero. When two droplets with induced dipoles get close to each other, they will experience a force pulling the droplets closer until they coalesce.

In oil production, co-produced water is mixed with the oil in choke valves and process equipment producing water-in-oil emulsions. The amount of water increases during the production life of the reservoir. The emulsions are destabilized using gravitational separators, and the settling rates are increased by applying heat, demulsifiers, and AC electric fields. The AC electric field gives rise to attractive forces between water droplets and increases the probability of coalescence at contact. According to Stokes' law, the settling rate increases proportionally with the square of the drop diameter. By promoting coalescence of small water droplets, the settling rate can be greatly increased. The water content is normally reduced to less than 0.5 vol% if this is the final treatment stage before the crude oil is exported.

Typical electrostatic coalescers are large settling tanks containing electrodes and operate under laminar-flow conditions with bare electrodes that may be vulnerable to short circuiting. An alternative to this type of coalescer is a flow through pre-coalescer that is installed upstream in a separator tank. In the Compact Electrostatic Coalescer, droplet coalescence is achieved by applying AC electric fields (50–60 Hz) to water-in-oil emulsions under turbulent-flow conditions. The turbulence increases the collision frequency between the water drops. The electrodes are insulated to prevent short circuiting, and permit water contents of up to 40% as well as water slugs. The equipment is a separate flow-through electrostatic treatment section installed upstream of a gravity separator to improve the performance. By keeping the treatment and settling sections separate, a compact electrostatic coalescer can be obtained that can also be retrofitted.

Liquid-liquid coalescers are also widely used in the oil refining industry to remove the last traces of contaminants like amine or caustic from intermediate products in oil refineries, and also for the last stage dewatering of final products like kerosene (jet fuel), LPG, gasoline and diesel to less than 15 mW free water in the hydrocarbon phase. These coalescers are often electrostatic type, in which a DC electrical field encourages the water droplets to coalesce, thus settling by gravity.
