= Entrainment (engineering) =

Entrapment of one substance by another substance

In engineering, entrainment is the entrapment of one substance by another substance. For example:

- The entrapment of liquid droplets or solid particulates in a flowing gas, as with smoke.
- The entrapment of gas bubbles or solid particulates in a flowing liquid, as with aeration.
- Given two mutually insoluble liquids, the emulsion of droplets of one liquid into the other liquid, as with margarine.
- Given two gases, the entrapment of one gas into the other gas.
- "Air entrainment" – The intentional entrapment of air bubbles into concrete.
- Entrainment defect in metallurgy, as a result of folded pockets of oxide inside the melt.

== See also ==
- Souders–Brown equation
