= Peace River Bridge =

Peace River Bridge may refer to any of the following bridges over the Peace River in Canada:

- Peace River Bridge (British Columbia), Taylor, British Columbia
- Peace River Suspension Bridge, Taylor, British Columbia (collapsed in 1957)
- Dunvegan Suspension Bridge, in Dunvegan, Alberta
- Hudson's Hope Suspension Bridge, Hudson's Hope, British Columbia

== See also ==
- Peace Bridge (Calgary), a pedestrian bridge over the Bow River in Calgary, Alberta, Canada
