= Instrumentation =

Measuring instruments which monitor and control a process

Instrumentation (/ˌɪnstrʊmənˈteɪʃən/) is a collective term for measuring instruments, used for indicating, measuring, and recording physical quantities. (Note: To introduce an instrument to measure something that had gone unmeasured can be said as 'instrumenting' (/ˈɪnstrʊˌmɛntɪŋ/) the thing in question.) It is also a field of study about the art and science about making measurement instruments, involving the related areas of metrology, automation, and control theory. The term has its origins in the art and science of scientific instrument-making.

Instrumentation can refer to devices as simple as direct-reading thermometers, or as complex as multi-sensor components of industrial control systems. Instruments can be found in laboratories, refineries, factories and vehicles, as well as in everyday household use (e.g., smoke detectors and thermostats).

== Measurement parameters ==
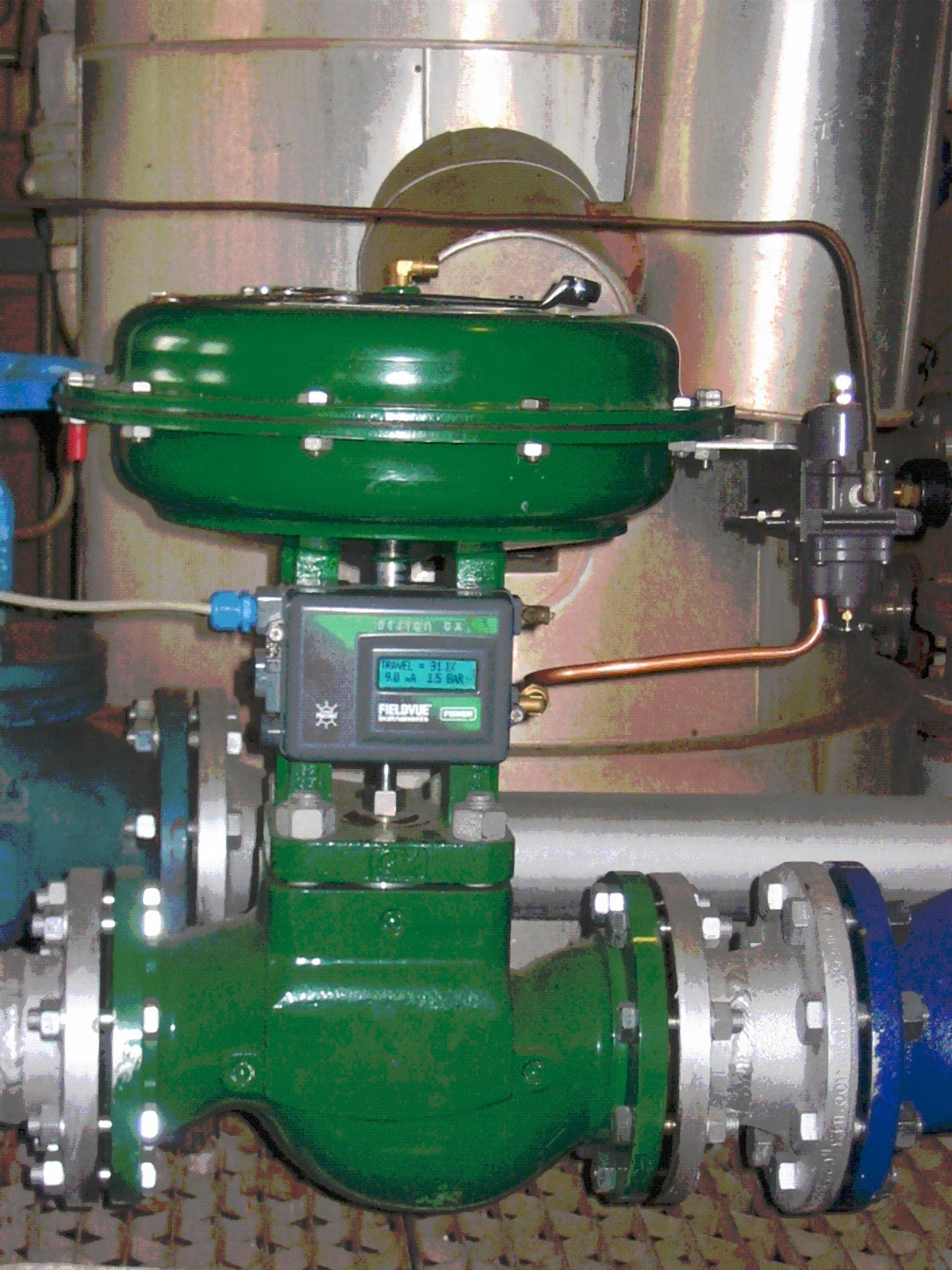
Control valve

Instrumentation is used to measure many parameters (physical values), including:

- Pressure, either differential or static
- Flow
- Temperature
- Levels of liquids, etc.
- Moisture or humidity
- Density
- Viscosity
- Ionizing radiation
- Frequency
- Current
- Voltage
- Inductance
- Capacitance
- Resistivity
- Chemical composition
- Chemical properties
  - Toxic gases
- Position
- Vibration
- Speed/Velocity
- Weight

== Etymology ==
Measuring devices are known as a "meter" and specific types are suffixed "-meter" (such as thermometer, speedometer) in all variants of English. The suffix "-meter" has the same Greek origin as the unit of length, "metron" and literally means "that by which a thing is measured."

== History ==
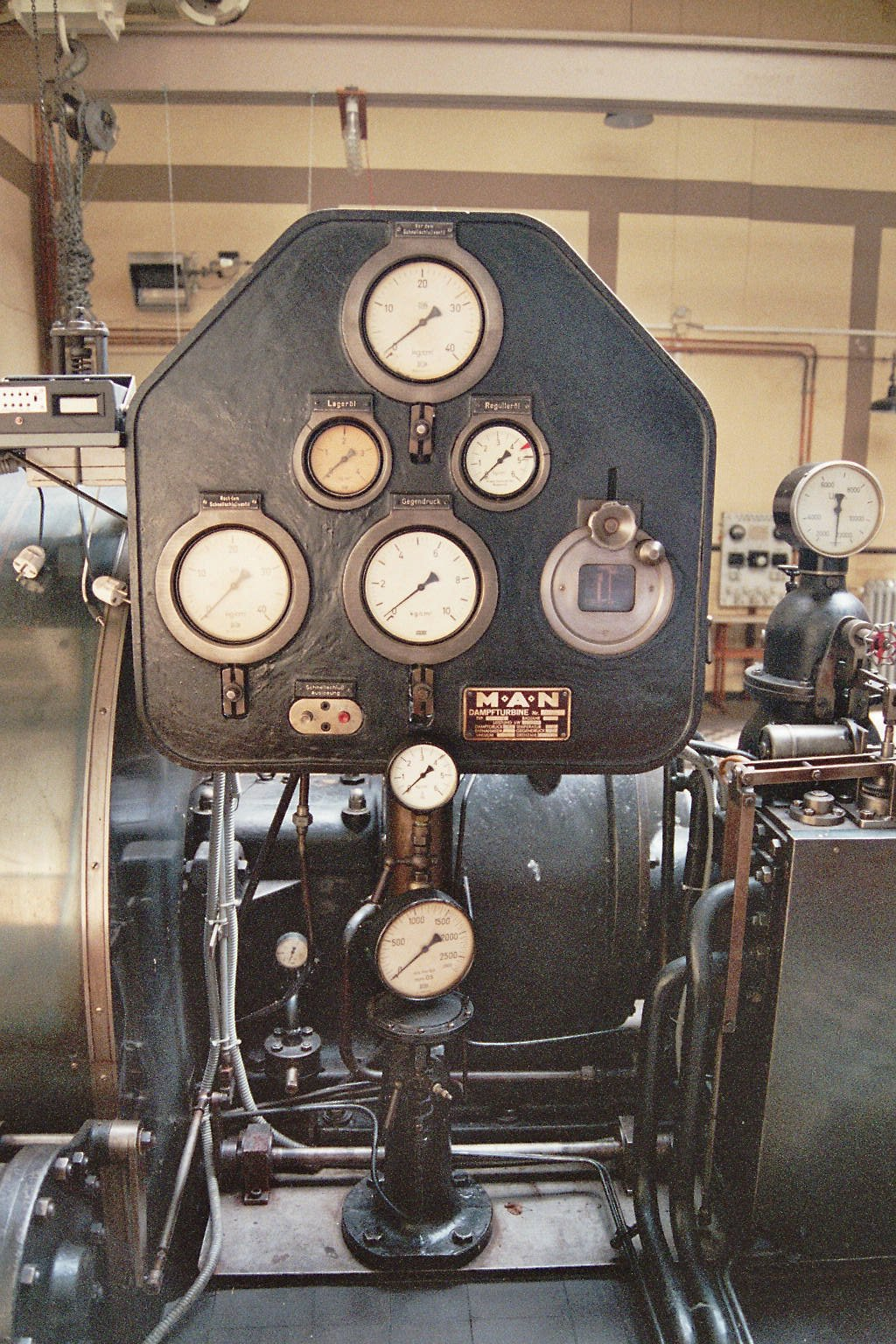
A local instrumentation panel on a steam turbine

The history of instrumentation can be divided into several phases.

=== Pre-industrial ===
Elements of industrial instrumentation have long histories. Scales for comparing weights and simple pointers to indicate position are ancient technologies. Some of the earliest measurements were of time. One of the oldest water clocks was found in the tomb of the ancient Egyptian pharaoh Amenhotep I, buried around 1500 BCE. Improvements were incorporated in the clocks. By 270 BCE they had the rudiments of an automatic control system device.

In 1663 Christopher Wren presented the Royal Society with a design for a "weather clock". A drawing shows meteorological sensors moving pens over paper driven by clockwork. Such devices did not become standard in meteorology for two centuries. The concept has remained virtually unchanged as evidenced by pneumatic chart recorders, where a pressurized bellows displaces a pen. Integrating sensors, displays, recorders, and controls was uncommon until the industrial revolution, limited by both need and practicality.

=== Early industrial ===
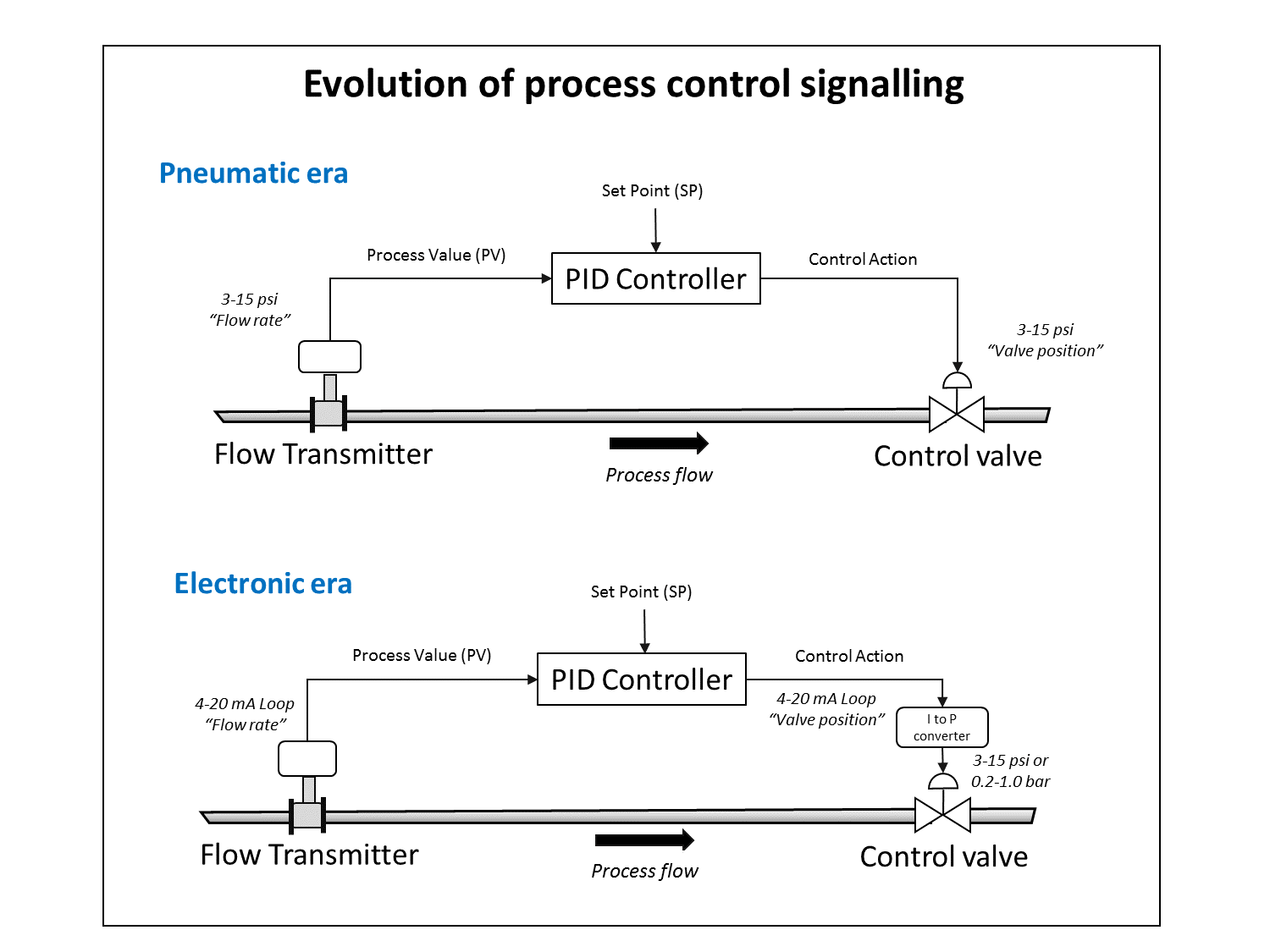
The evolution of analogue control loop signalling from the pneumatic era to the electronic era

Early systems used direct process connections to local control panels for control and indication, which from the early 1930s saw the introduction of pneumatic transmitters and automatic 3-term (PID) controllers.

The ranges of pneumatic transmitters were defined by the need to control valves and actuators in the field. Typically, a signal ranged from 3 to 15 psi (20 to 100kPa or 0.2 to 1.0 kg/cm2) as a standard, was standardized with 6 to 30 psi occasionally being used for larger valves. Transistor electronics enabled wiring to replace pipes, initially with a range of 20 to 100mA at up to 90V for loop powered devices, reducing to 4 to 20mA at 12 to 24V in more modern systems. A transmitter is a device that produces an output signal, often in the form of a 4–20 mA electrical current signal, although many other options using voltage, frequency, pressure, or ethernet are possible. The transistor was commercialized by the mid-1950s.

Instruments attached to a control system provided signals used to operate solenoids, valves, regulators, circuit breakers, relays and other devices. Such devices could control a desired output variable, and provide either remote monitoring or automated control capabilities.

Each instrument company introduced their own standard instrumentation signal, causing confusion until the 4–20 mA range was used as the standard electronic instrument signal for transmitters and valves. This signal was eventually standardized as ANSI/ISA S50, "Compatibility of Analog Signals for Electronic Industrial Process Instruments", in the 1970s. The transformation of instrumentation from mechanical pneumatic transmitters, controllers, and valves to electronic instruments reduced maintenance costs as electronic instruments were more dependable than mechanical instruments. This also increased efficiency and production due to their increase in accuracy. Pneumatics enjoyed some advantages, being favored in corrosive and explosive atmospheres.

=== Automatic process control ===
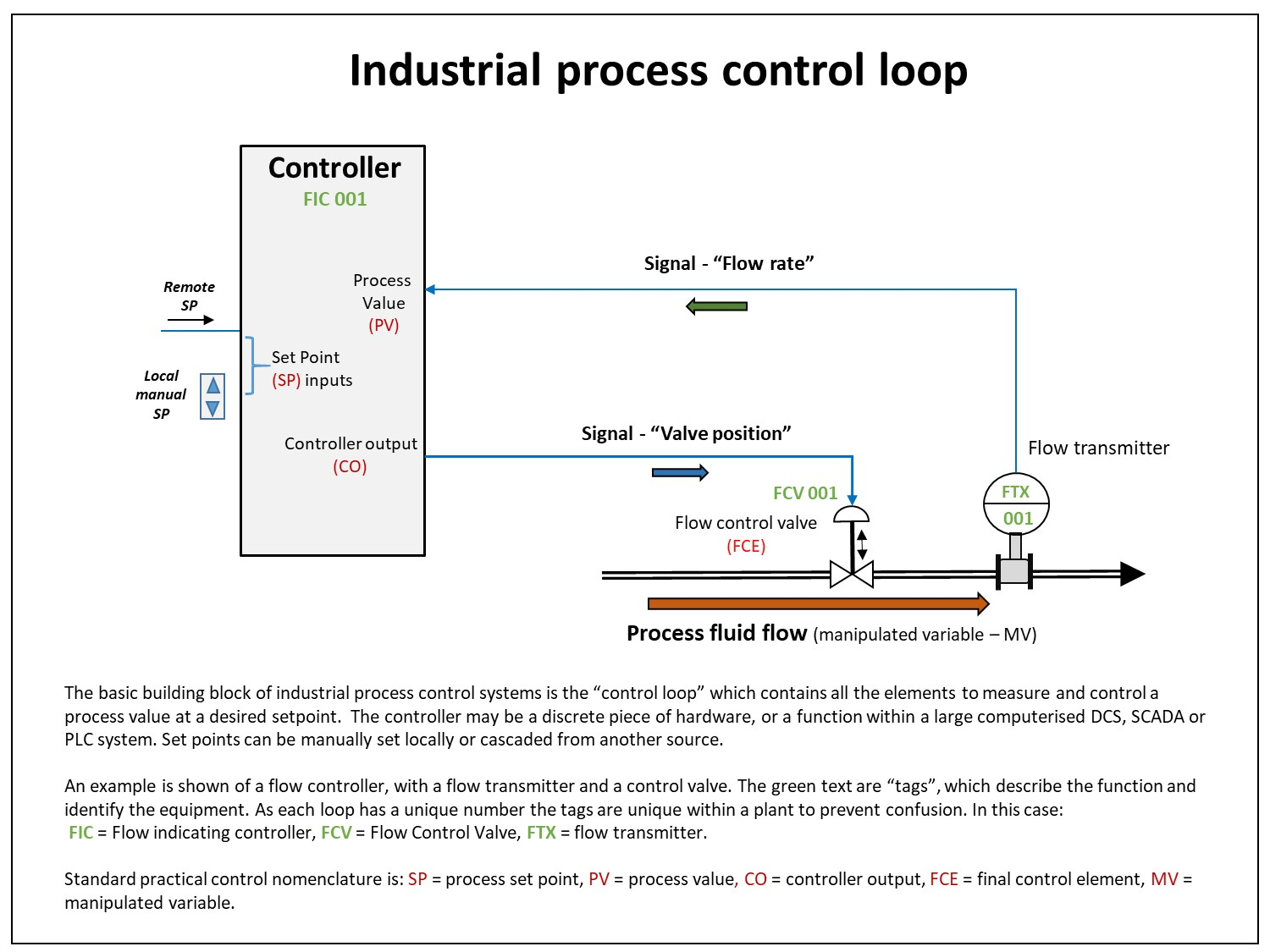
Example of a single industrial control loop, showing continuously modulated control of process flow

In the early years of process control, process indicators and control elements such as valves were monitored by an operator, that walked around the unit adjusting the valves to obtain the desired temperatures, pressures, and flows. As technology evolved pneumatic controllers were invented and mounted in the field that monitored the process and controlled the valves. This reduced the amount of time process operators needed to monitor the process. Latter years, the actual controllers were moved to a central room and signals were sent into the control room to monitor the process and outputs signals were sent to the final control element such as a valve to adjust the process as needed. These controllers and indicators were mounted on a wall called a control board. The operators stood in front of this board walking back and forth monitoring the process indicators. This again reduced the number and amount of time process operators were needed to walk around the units. The most standard pneumatic signal level used during these years was 3–15 psig.

=== Large integrated computer-based systems ===
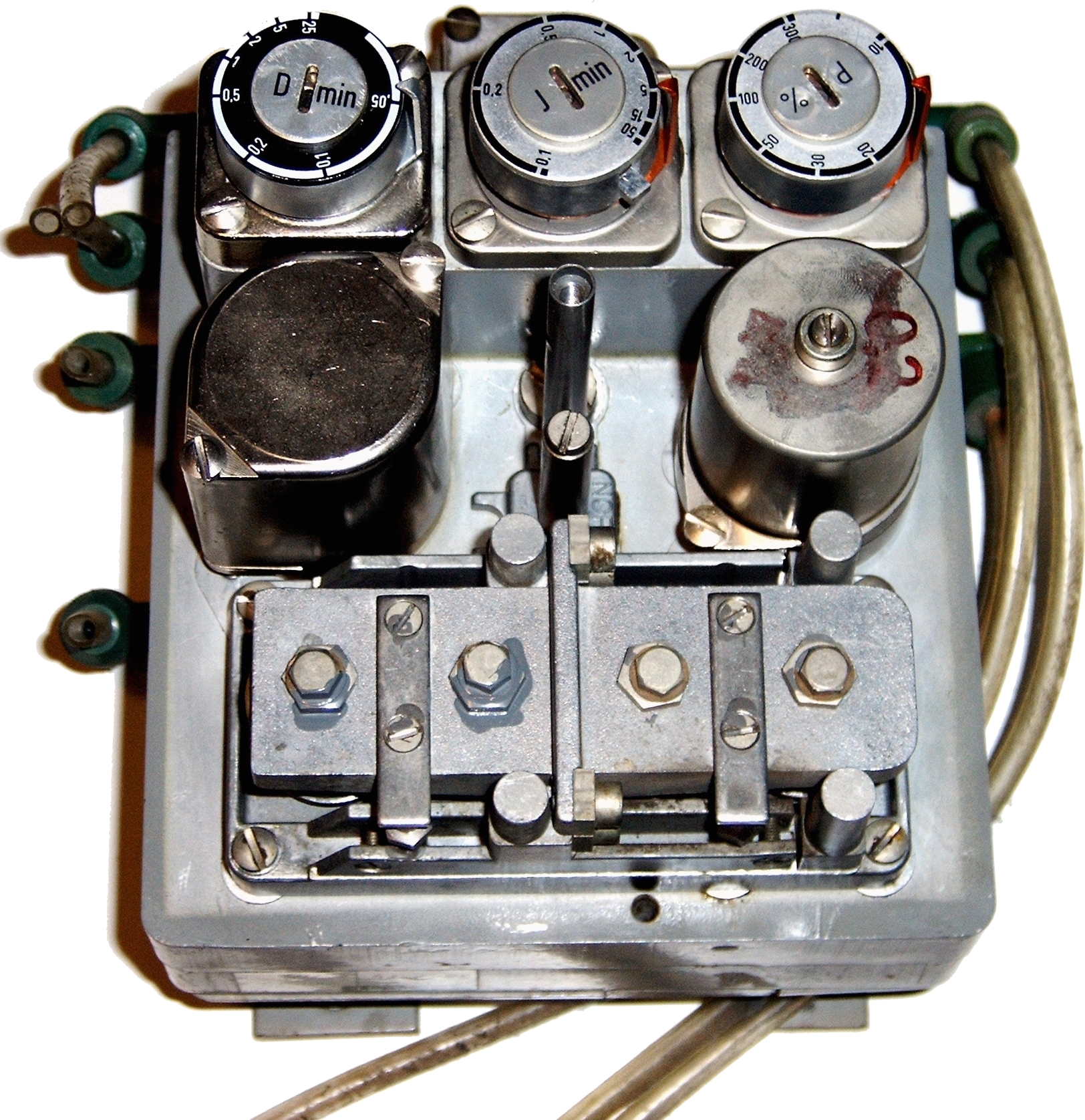
Pneumatic "three term" pneumatic PID controller, widely used before electronics became reliable and cheaper and safe to use in hazardous areas (Siemens Telepneu Example)

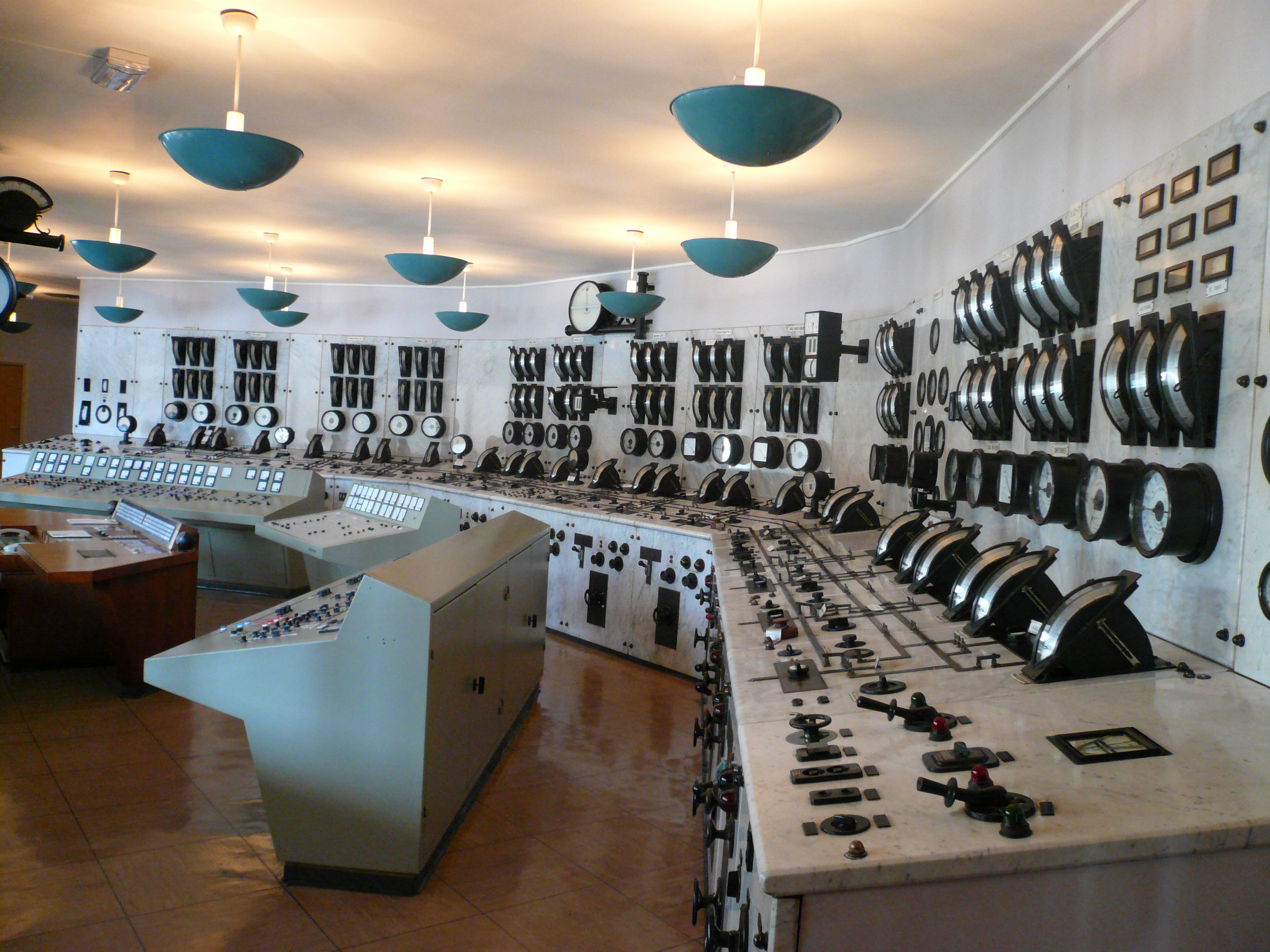
A pre-DCS/SCADA era central control room. Whilst the controls are centralised in one place, they are still discrete and not integrated into one system.

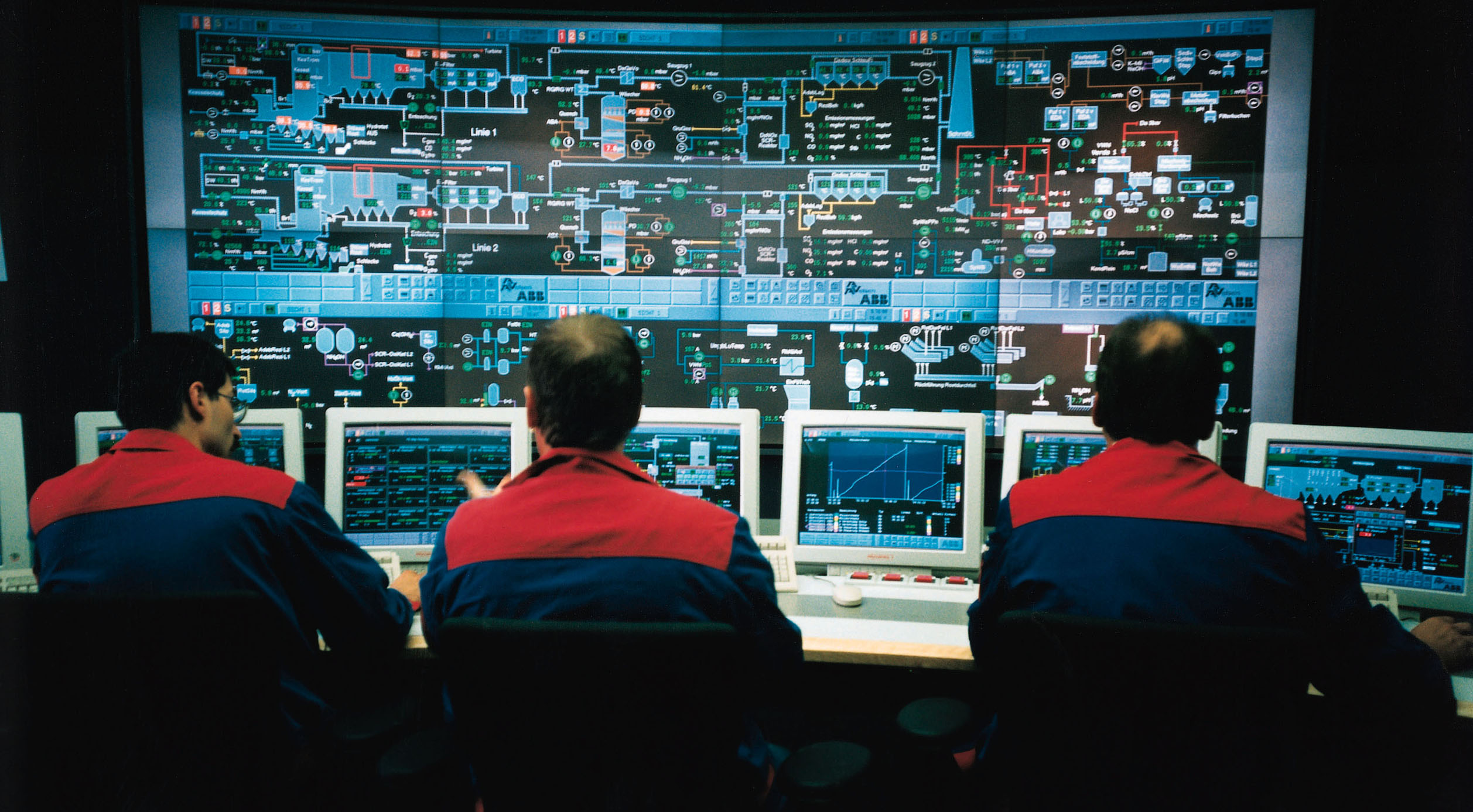
A DCS control room where plant information and controls are displayed on computer graphics screens. The operators are seated and can view and control any part of the process from their screens, whilst retaining a plant overview.

Process control of large industrial plants has evolved through many stages. Initially, control would be from panels local to the process plant. However, this required a large manpower resource to attend to these dispersed panels, and there was no overall view of the process. The next logical development was the transmission of all plant measurements to a permanently staffed central control room. Effectively this was the centralization of all the localized panels, with the advantages of lower manning levels and easy overview of the process. Often the controllers were behind the control room panels, and all automatic and manual control outputs were transmitted back to plant.

However, whilst providing a central control focus, this arrangement was inflexible as each control loop had its own controller hardware, and continual operator movement within the control room was required to view different parts of the process. With coming of electronic processors and graphic displays it became possible to replace these discrete controllers with computer-based algorithms, hosted on a network of input/output racks with their own control processors. These could be distributed around plant, and communicate with the graphic display in the control room or rooms. The distributed control concept was born.

The introduction of DCSs and SCADA allowed easy interconnection and re-configuration of plant controls such as cascaded loops and interlocks, and easy interfacing with other production computer systems. It enabled sophisticated alarm handling, introduced automatic event logging, removed the need for physical records such as chart recorders, allowed the control racks to be networked and thereby located locally to plant to reduce cabling runs, and provided high level overviews of plant status and production levels.

== Application ==
In some cases, the sensor is a very minor element of the mechanism. Digital cameras and wristwatches might technically meet the loose definition of instrumentation because they record and/or display sensed information. Under most circumstances neither would be called instrumentation, but when used to measure the elapsed time of a race and to document the winner at the finish line, both would be called instrumentation.

=== Household ===
A very simple example of an instrumentation system is a mechanical thermostat, used to control a household furnace and thus to control room temperature. A typical unit senses temperature with a bi-metallic strip. It displays temperature by a needle on the free end of the strip. It activates the furnace by a mercury switch. As the switch is rotated by the strip, the mercury makes physical (and thus electrical) contact between electrodes.

Another example of an instrumentation system is a home security system. Such a system consists of sensors (motion detection, switches to detect door openings), simple algorithms to detect intrusion, local control (arm/disarm) and remote monitoring of the system so that the police can be summoned. Communication is an inherent part of the design.

Kitchen appliances use sensors for control.

- A refrigerator maintains a constant temperature by actuating the cooling system when the temperature becomes too high.
- An automatic ice machine makes ice until a limit switch is thrown.
- Pop-up bread toasters allow the time to be set.
- Non-electronic gas ovens will regulate the temperature with a thermostat controlling the flow of gas to the gas burner. These may feature a sensor bulb sited within the main chamber of the oven. In addition, there may be a safety cut-off flame supervision device: after ignition, the burner's control knob must be held for a short time in order for a sensor to become hot, and permit the flow of gas to the burner. If the safety sensor becomes cold, this may indicate the flame on the burner has become extinguished, and to prevent a continuous leak of gas the flow is stopped.
- Electric ovens use a temperature sensor and will turn on heating elements when the temperature is too low. More advanced ovens will actuate fans in response to temperature sensors, to distribute heat or to cool.
- A common toilet refills the water tank until a float closes the valve. The float is acting as a water level sensor.

=== Automotive ===
Modern automobiles have complex instrumentation. In addition to displays of engine rotational speed and vehicle linear speed, there are also displays of battery voltage and current, fluid levels, fluid temperatures, distance traveled, and feedback of various controls (turn signals, parking brake, headlights, transmission position). Cautions may be displayed for special problems (fuel low, check engine, tire pressure low, door ajar, seat belt unfastened). Problems are recorded so they can be reported to diagnostic equipment. Navigation systems can provide voice commands to reach a destination. Automotive instrumentation must be cheap and reliable over long periods in harsh environments. There may be independent airbag systems that contain sensors, logic and actuators. Anti-skid braking systems use sensors to control the brakes, while cruise control affects throttle position. A wide variety of services can be provided via communication links on the OnStar system. Autonomous cars (with exotic instrumentation) have been shown.

=== Aircraft ===
Early aircraft had a few sensors. "Steam gauges" converted air pressures into needle deflections that could be interpreted as altitude and airspeed. A magnetic compass provided a sense of direction. The displays to the pilot were as critical as the measurements.

A modern aircraft has a far more sophisticated suite of sensors and displays, which are embedded into avionics systems. The aircraft may contain inertial navigation systems, global positioning systems, weather radar, autopilots, and aircraft stabilization systems. Redundant sensors are used for reliability. A subset of the information may be transferred to a crash recorder to aid mishap investigations. Modern pilot displays now include computer displays including head-up displays.

Air traffic control radar is a distributed instrumentation system. The ground part sends an electromagnetic pulse and receives an echo (at least). Aircraft carry transponders that transmit codes on reception of the pulse. The system displays an aircraft map location, an identifier and optionally altitude. The map location is based on sensed antenna direction and sensed time delay. The other information is embedded in the transponder transmission.

=== Laboratory instrumentation ===
Among the possible uses of the term is a collection of laboratory test equipment controlled by a computer through an IEEE-488 bus (also known as GPIB for General Purpose Instrument Bus or HPIB for Hewlitt Packard Instrument Bus). Laboratory equipment is available to measure many electrical and chemical quantities. Such a collection of equipment might be used to automate the testing of drinking water for pollutants.

== Instrumentation engineering ==
The instrumentation part of a piping and instrumentation diagram will be developed by an instrumentation engineer.

Instrumentation engineering is the engineering specialization focused on the principle and operation of measuring instruments that are used in design and configuration of automated systems in areas such as electrical and pneumatic domains, and the control of quantities being measured. They typically work for industries with automated processes, such as chemical or manufacturing plants, with the goal of improving system productivity, reliability, safety, optimization and stability. To control the parameters in a process or in a particular system, devices such as microprocessors, microcontrollers or PLCs are used, but their ultimate aim is to control the parameters of a system. The control of parameters of a system is achieved in the final control element which forms a closed loop along with measuring instrument and control system. Instrumentation engineers are often responsible for the complete loop hence also associated with design, sizing and selection of the final control element (eg: Control valve, Damper (flow), motors, Solenoid valve, Relay, etc.).

Instrumentation engineering is loosely defined because the required tasks are very domain dependent. An expert in the biomedical instrumentation of laboratory rats has very different concerns than the expert in rocket instrumentation. Common concerns of both are the selection of appropriate sensors based on size, weight, cost, reliability, accuracy, longevity, environmental robustness, and frequency response. Some sensors are literally fired in artillery shells. Others sense thermonuclear explosions until destroyed. Invariably sensor data must be recorded, transmitted or displayed. Recording rates and capacities vary enormously. Transmission can be trivial or can be clandestine, encrypted and low power in the presence of jamming. Displays can be trivially simple or can require consultation with human factors experts. Control system design varies from trivial to a separate specialty.

Instrumentation engineers are responsible for integrating the sensors with the recorders, transmitters, displays or control systems, and producing the Piping and instrumentation diagram for the process. They may design or specify installation, wiring and signal conditioning. They may be responsible for commissioning, calibration, testing and maintenance of the system.

In a research environment it is common for subject matter experts to have substantial instrumentation system expertise. An astronomer knows the structure of the universe and a great deal about telescopes – optics, pointing and cameras (or other sensing elements). That often includes the hard-won knowledge of the operational procedures that provide the best results. For example, an astronomer is often knowledgeable of techniques to minimize temperature gradients that cause air turbulence within the telescope.

Instrumentation technologists, technicians and mechanics specialize in troubleshooting, repairing and maintaining instruments and instrumentation systems.

=== Typical industrial transmitter signal types ===
- Pneumatic loop (20-100KPa/3-15PSI) – Pneumatic
- Current loop (4-20mA) – Electrical
- HART – Data signalling, often overlaid on a current loop
- Foundation Fieldbus – Data signalling
- Profibus – Data signalling
- Ethernet APL - Data signalling

== Impact of modern development ==
Ralph Müller (1940) stated, "That the history of physical science is largely the history of instruments and their intelligent use is well known. The broad generalizations and theories which have arisen from time to time have stood or fallen on the basis of accurate measurement, and in several instances new instruments have had to be devised for the purpose. There is little evidence to show that the mind of modern man is superior to that of the ancients. His tools are incomparably better."

Davis Baird has argued that the major change associated with Floris Cohen's identification of a "fourth big scientific revolution" or more often known as Fourth Industrial Revolution after World War II is the development of scientific instrumentation, not only in chemistry but across the sciences. In chemistry, the introduction of new instrumentation in the 1940s was "nothing less than a scientific and technological revolution" in which classical wet-and-dry methods of structural organic chemistry were discarded, and new areas of research opened up.

As early as 1954, W. A. Wildhack discussed both the productive and destructive potential inherent in process control. The ability to make precise, verifiable and reproducible measurements of the natural world, at levels that were not previously observable, using scientific instrumentation, has "provided a different texture of the world". This instrumentation revolution fundamentally changes human abilities to monitor and respond, as is illustrated in the examples of DDT monitoring and the use of UV spectrophotometry and gas chromatography to monitor water pollutants.

== See also ==
- Industrial control system
- Instrumentation and control engineering
- Instrumentation in petrochemical industries
- Institute of Measurement and Control
- International Society of Automation
- List of sensors
- Measurement
- Medical instrumentation
- Metrology
- Piping and instrumentation diagram – a diagram in the process industry which shows the piping of the process flow together with the installed equipment and instrumentation.
- Programmable logic controller
- Timeline of temperature and pressure measurement technology
