= Jordan Kealy =

Canadian politician

Member of the British Columbia Legislative Assembly for Peace River North
- In office October 19, 2024 – October 24, 2026
- Preceded by: Dan Davies
- Succeeded by: Curtis Whitford

Personal details
- Party: Independent (2025–present)
- Other political affiliations: BC Conservative (before 2025)

Jordan Kealy is a Canadian politician who has served as a member of the Legislative Assembly of British Columbia (MLA) representing the electoral district of Peace River North from 2024 to 2026. Initially elected as a member of the Conservative Party, he left the party in 2025 and sat as an Independent until the end of his term.

== Early life and career ==
Kealy is a farmer and mechanic by profession. Prior to his election, he served as a regional director on the Peace River Regional District Board from 2022 until his resignation on November 6, 2024 after his election as an MLA.

== Political career ==
In November 2023, Kealy became the Conservative Party of British Columbia nominee for Peace River North. In October 2024, Kealy defeated incumbent MLA Dan Davies, formerly of the BC United party, in the British Columbia general election. In March 2025, he left the Conservative Party to sit as an independent, after the MLA for Vancouver-Quilchena, Dallas Brodie, was removed from caucus.

In June 2026, Kealy was charged with sexual assault in Fort St. John, British Columbia. He has denied the allegations.

In the 2026 general election, Kealy ran as an independent against Conservative candidate Curtis Whitford. He was defeated with only 14% of the vote.

== Political views ==
=== Chemtrails ===
Kealy made multiple social media posts in support of the chemtrail conspiracy theory. A post made by his farm's Facebook account claimed that the government was using the "chemtrails" to control the weather. The day before the election, Kealy noted that aviation is under federal jurisdiction in response to questions if he was going to "stop the chemtrails".

=== Healthcare ===
After a July 2024 emergency department closure in Fort St. John, British Columbia, Kealey criticized both the British Columbia New Democratic Party and BC United parties for failing to expand healthcare as the population grew. Kealey suggested getting rid of COVID-19 vaccine mandates and allowing private health services.

== Electoral history ==
2026 British Columbia general election: Peace River North
** Preliminary results — Not yet official **
Party	Candidate	Votes	%	±%
Conservative	Curtis Whitford	8,957	85.75	+11.38
Independent	Jordan Kealy	1,489	14.25	–
Total valid votes		10,446	97.18	
Total rejected ballots		303	2.82	+2.70
Turnout		10,749		
Registered voters				
Source: Elections BC
Conservative hold		Swing		–1.44
Note: Incumbent MLA Jordan Kealy was elected in 2024 as a Conservative, but was removed from the Conservative caucus on March 7, 2025. He is running for re-election as an independent candidate.

2024 British Columbia general election: Peace River North
Party	Candidate	Votes	%	±%	Expenditures
Conservative	Jordan Kealy	11,213	74.36	+40.06	$33,050.72
Independent	Dan Davies	3,038	20.15	–	$29,326.39
New Democratic	Ian McMahon	828	5.49	-4.44	$1,180.64
Total valid votes/expense limit		15,079	99.88	–	$71,700.08
Total rejected ballots		18	0.12	–	
Turnout		15,097	57.16	+10.68	
Registered voters		26,413			
Conservative gain from BC United		Swing		–	
Incumbent MLA Dan Davies was originally nominated as the BC United candidate, but ran as an independent after BC United suspended its campaign.
Source: Elections BC

== See also ==
- 43rd Parliament of British Columbia
