= Instrumentation and control engineering =

Branch of engineering studying process variables

Instrumentation and control engineering (ICE) is a branch of engineering that studies the measurement and control of process variables, and the design and implementation of systems that incorporate them. Process variables include pressure, temperature, humidity, flow, pH, force and speed.

ICE combines two branches of engineering. Instrumentation engineering is the science of the measurement and control of process variables within a production or manufacturing area. Meanwhile, control engineering, also called control systems engineering, is the engineering discipline that applies control theory to design systems with desired behaviors.

Control engineers are responsible for the research, design, and development of control devices and systems, typically in manufacturing facilities and process plants. Control methods employ sensors to measure the output variable of the device and provide feedback to the controller so that it can make corrections toward desired performance. Automatic control manages a device without the need of human inputs for correction, such as cruise control for regulating a car's speed.

Control systems engineering activities are multi-disciplinary in nature. They focus on the implementation of control systems, mainly derived by mathematical modeling. Because instrumentation and control play a significant role in gathering information from a system and changing its parameters, they are a key part of control loops.

== As profession ==
High demand for engineering professionals is found in fields associated with process automation. Specializations include industrial instrumentation, system dynamics, process control, and control systems. Additionally, technological knowledge, particularly in computer systems, is essential to the job of an instrumentation and control engineer; important technology-related topics include human–computer interaction, programmable logic controllers, and SCADA. The tasks center around designing, developing, maintaining and managing control systems.

The goals of the work of an instrumentation and control engineer are to maximize:

- Productivity
- Optimization
- Stability
- Reliability
- Safety
- Continuity

== As academic discipline ==
Instrumentation and control engineering is a vital field of study offered at many universities worldwide at both the graduate and postgraduate levels. This discipline integrates principles from various branches of engineering, providing a comprehensive understanding of the design, analysis, and management of automated systems.

Typical coursework for this discipline includes, but is not limited to, subjects such as control system design, instrumentation fundamentals, process control, sensors and signal processing, automation, robotics, and industrial data communications. Advanced courses may delve into topics like intelligent control systems, digital signal processing, and embedded systems design.

Students often have the opportunity to engage in hands-on laboratory work and industry-relevant projects, which foster practical skills alongside theoretical knowledge. These experiences are crucial in preparing graduates for careers in diverse sectors including manufacturing, power generation, oil and gas, and healthcare, where they may design and maintain systems that automate processes, improve efficiency, and enhance safety.

Interdisciplinary by nature, the field is accessible to students from various engineering backgrounds. Most commonly, students with a foundation in Electrical Engineering and Mechanical Engineering are drawn to this field due to their strong base in control systems, system dynamics, electro-mechanical machines and devices, and electric circuits (course work). However, with the growing complexity and integration of systems, students from fields like computer engineering, chemical engineering, and even biomedical engineering are increasingly contributing to and benefiting from studies in instrumentation and control engineering.

Furthermore, the rapid advancement of technology in areas like the Internet of Things (IoT), artificial intelligence (AI), and machine learning is continuously shaping the curriculum of this discipline, making it an ever-evolving and dynamic field of study.

== See also ==
- Industrial system
- Instrumentation in petrochemical industries
- List of sensors
- Metrology
- Measurement
- Programmable logic controller
- International Society of Automation
