= Curtis Whitford =

Canadian politician

Curtis Whitford MLA

Member of the British Columbia Legislative Assembly for Peace River North
- Incumbent
- Assumed office October 24, 2026
- Preceded by: Jordan Kealy

Personal details
- Party: BC Conservative

Curtis Whitford MLA is a Canadian politician who has served as a member of the Legislative Assembly of British Columbia (MLA) representing the electoral district of Peace River North since 2026. He is a member of the Conservative Party.

== Early career and education ==
Whitford was born in Fort St. John and comes from a family that has been in the area for almost a century. Before entering politics, Whitford worked in the oil and gas industry for 36 years.

== Political career ==
In September 2026, Whitford ran as a candidate for the BC Conservatives in the 2026 general election running in the electoral district of Peace River North. He was elected, defeating incumbent Jordan Kealy who ran as an independent.

== Electoral history ==
2026 British Columbia general election: Peace River North
** Preliminary results — Not yet official **
Party	Candidate	Votes	%	±%
Conservative	Curtis Whitford	9,371	83.25	
Independent	Jordan Kealy	1,563	13.89	–
Total valid votes		10,934	97.14	
Total rejected ballots		322	2.86	
Turnout		11,256		
Registered voters				
Source: Elections BC
Conservative hold		Swing		–1.44
Note: Incumbent MLA Jordan Kealy was elected in 2024 as a Conservative, but was removed from the Conservative caucus on March 7, 2025. He is running for re-election as an independent candidate.
