= Peace River North =

Provincial electoral district in British Columbia, Canada

British Columbia electoral district
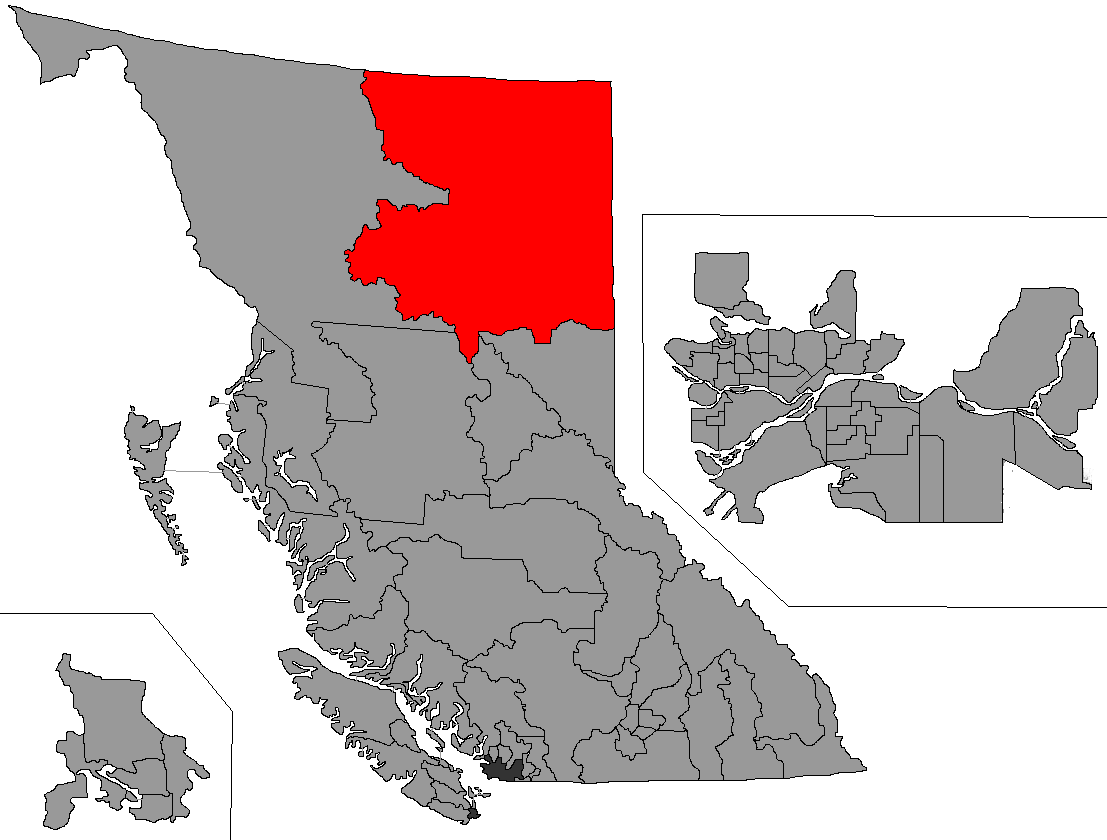

Provincial electoral district
- Legislature: Legislative Assembly of British Columbia
MLA
Curtis Whitford
Conservative
- District created: 1955
- First contested: 1956
- Last contested: 2026

Demographics
- Population (2001): 32,353
- Area (km²): 160,485
- Pop. density (per km²): 0.2
- Census subdivision(s): Fort St. John, Fort Nelson, Hudson's Hope, Taylor

Peace River North is a provincial electoral district for the Legislative Assembly of British Columbia, Canada. It was created under the name North Peace River by the Constitution Amendment Act, 1955, which split the old riding of Peace River into northern and southern portions for the 1956 BC election. Its current name has been in use since 1991.

Peace River North has been represented by a variety of British Columbia political parties over the years. The riding has consistently elected political parties that come from the right side of the political spectrum. For many years the riding was represented by the BC Social Credit Party and the centre-right BC Liberal Party. Currently, the riding is represented by the BC Conservative Party. The left-of-centre New Democratic Party has never been successful in electing a candidate to the BC Legislature, despite fielding numerous candidates since the 1950s.

In 2023, a petition to recall the district's then-MLA, Dan Davies, was approved by Elections BC under the Recall and Initiative Act. However, the petition did not attract the required number of signatures.

== Geography ==
As of the 2020 provincial election, Peace River North comprises the entire area of the Northern Rockies Regional Municipality and the northern portion of the Peace River Regional District, located in northeastern British Columbia. The electoral district is bordered by Alberta in the east and the Yukon and Northwest Territories to the north. Communities in the electoral district consist of Fort St. John, Fort Nelson, Taylor, and Hudson's Hope.

== Members of the Legislative Assembly ==
This riding has elected the following members of the Legislative Assembly:

Assembly	Years	Member	Party
North Peace River; Riding created from Peace River
25th	1956–1960	Harold Earl Roche	Social Credit
26th	1960–1963	Jacob Francis Huhn	Social Credit
27th	1963–1966	Jacob Francis Huhn	Social Credit
28th	1966–1969	Ed Smith	Social Credit
29th	1969–1972	Ed Smith	Social Credit
30th	1972–1975	Ed Smith	Social Credit
31st	1975–1979	Ed Smith	Social Credit
32nd	1979–1983	Tony Brummet	Social Credit
33rd	1983–1986	Tony Brummet	Social Credit
34th	1986–1991	Tony Brummet	Social Credit
Peace River North
35th	1991–1995	Richard Neufeld	Social Credit
35th	1995–1996	Richard Neufeld	Reform
36th	1996–1997	Richard Neufeld	Reform
36th	1997–2001	Richard Neufeld	Liberal
37th	2001–2005	Richard Neufeld	Liberal
38th	2005–2009	Richard Neufeld	Liberal
39th	2009–2010	Pat Pimm	Liberal
39th	2010–2011	Pat Pimm	Independent
39th	2011–2013	Pat Pimm	Liberal
40th	2013–2016	Pat Pimm	Liberal
40th	2016–2017	Pat Pimm	Independent
41st	2017–2020	Dan Davies	Liberal
42nd	2020–2023	Dan Davies	Liberal
42nd	2023–2024	Dan Davies	BC United
43rd	2024–2025	Jordan Kealy	Conservative
43rd	2025–2026	Jordan Kealy	Independent
44th	2026–present	Curtis Whitford	Conservative

== Election history ==
2026 British Columbia general election
The 2026 general election will be held on October 24.
Party	Candidate	Votes	%	±%	Expenditures
Independent	Jordan Kealy			–	
Conservative	Curtis Whitford				
Total valid votes					
Total rejected ballots					
Turnout					
Registered voters					
Source: Elections BC
Note: Incumbent MLA Jordan Kealy was elected in 2024 as a Conservative, but was removed from the Conservative caucus on March 7, 2025. He is running for re-election as an independent candidate.

2024 British Columbia general election
Party	Candidate	Votes	%	±%	Expenditures
Conservative	Jordan Kealy	11,213	74.36	+40.06	$33,050.72
Independent	Dan Davies	3,038	20.15	–	$29,326.39
New Democratic	Ian McMahon	828	5.49	-4.44	$1,180.64
Total valid votes/expense limit		15,079	99.88	–	$71,700.08
Total rejected ballots		18	0.12	–	
Turnout		15,097	57.16	+10.68	
Registered voters		26,413			
Conservative gain from BC United		Swing		–	
Incumbent MLA Dan Davies was originally nominated as the BC United candidate, but ran as an independent after BC United suspended its campaign.
Source: Elections BC

2020 British Columbia general election
Party	Candidate	Votes	%	±%	Expenditures
Liberal	Dan Davies	6,746	55.76	−10.51	$32,293.82
Conservative	Trevor Bolin	4,150	34.30	–	$0.00
New Democratic	Danielle Monroe	1,202	9.94	+3.37	$739.00
Total valid votes		12,098	99.29	–	
Total rejected ballots		86	0.71		
Turnout		12,184	46.48		
Registered voters		26,216			
Source: Elections BC

2017 British Columbia general election
Party	Candidate	Votes	%	±%	Expenditures
Liberal	Dan Davies	9,707	66.27	+7.33	$53,883
Independent	Bob Fedderly	2,785	19.01	–	$31,928
New Democratic	Robert Dempsey	962	6.57	−3.27	$1,739
Independent	Rob Fraser	917	6.27	–	$25,354
Independent	Jeff Richert	275	1.88	–	$1,064
Total valid votes		14,646	100.00		
Total rejected ballots		65	0.44		
Turnout		14,711	56.74		
Source: Elections BC

2013 British Columbia general election
Party	Candidate	Votes	%	±%	Expenditures
Liberal	Pat Pimm	7,905	58.94	+15.79	$115,737
Independent	Arthur Austin Hadland	3,287	24.51	–6.82	$40,752
New Democratic	Judy Ann Fox-McGuire	1,319	9.84	–4.14	$36,341
Conservative	Wyeth Sigurdson	900	6.71	–	$882
Total valid votes		13,411	100.00		
Total rejected ballots		44	0.33		
Turnout		13,455	51.47		
Liberal hold		Swing		+11.30	
Source: Elections BC

2009 British Columbia general election
Party	Candidate	Votes	%	±%	Expenditures
Liberal	Pat Pimm	3,992	43.15	–16.22	$55,563
Independent	Arthur Hadland	2,899	31.33	–	$17,962
New Democratic	Jackie Allen	1,293	13.98	–13.14	$17,855
Green	Liz Logan	1,010	10.92	+4.03	$26,218
Refederation	Sue Arntson	58	0.63	–	$260
Total valid votes		9,252	100.0		
Total rejected ballots		52	0.6		
Turnout		9,304	40		
Liberal hold		Swing		–23.78	

2005 British Columbia general election
Party	Candidate	Votes	%	±%	Expenditures
Liberal	Richard Neufeld	5,498	59.37	–13.85	$97,647
New Democratic	Brian Churchill	2,511	27.12	+15.56	$21,975
Green	Clarence G. Apsassin	638	6.89	–	$200
Independent	Leonard Joseph Seigo	613	6.62	–	$3,829
Total valid votes		9,260	100.0		
Total rejected ballots		61	0.66		
Turnout		9,321	47.4		
Liberal hold		Swing		–14.70	

2001 British Columbia general election
Party	Candidate	Votes	%	±%	Expenditures
Liberal	Richard Neufeld	6,629	73.22	+44.56 +24.81	$37,046
New Democratic	Brian Churchill	1,047	11.56	–6.48	$9,796
Marijuana	Paul Renaud	810	8.95	–	$3,199
Unity	Roy Daniel Stange	568	6.27	–	$867
Total valid votes		9,054	100.0		
Total rejected ballots		55	0.61		
Turnout		9,109	55.12		
Liberal gain from Reform		Swing		+25.52	

1996 British Columbia general election
Party	Candidate	Votes	%	±%	Expenditures
Reform	Richard Neufeld	5,299	48.41	–6.38	$23,557
Liberal	Ben Knutson	3,137	28.66	+9.17	$20,370
New Democratic	Brian Churchill	1,975	18.04	–4.29	$27,682
Social Credit	Dave Bodnar	240	2.19	–52.60	$3,978
Progressive Democrat	Neil Bitterman	169	1.54	–	$425
Independent	Brent Hoar	125	1.14	–	$100
Total valid votes		10,945	100.0		
Total rejected ballots		43	0.39		
Turnout		10,988	60.49		
Reform gain from Social Credit		Swing		+19.62	

1991 British Columbia general election
Party	Candidate	Votes	%	±%	Expenditures
Social Credit	Richard Neufeld	5,758	54.79	–12.42	$23,852
New Democratic	A. Jean Leahy	2,347	22.33	–2.13	$34,828
Liberal	Vincent R. Rodriguez	2,048	19.49	+16.56	$2,305
Green	Clarence G. Apsassin	303	2.88	–	$1,895
Independent	Dorothy L. Folk	54	0.51	–	$925
Total valid votes		10,510	100.0		
Total rejected ballots		277	2.57		
Turnout		10,787	70.01		
Social Credit hold		Swing		–5.14	

== See also ==
- List of British Columbia provincial electoral districts
- Canadian provincial electoral districts
