= Pat Pimm =

Canadian politician (1957–2024)

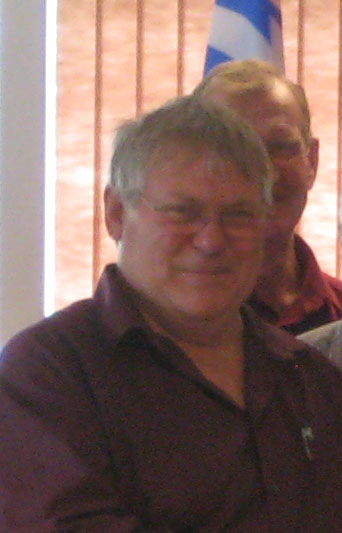
- Pimm in 2011

Member of the British Columbia Legislative Assembly for Peace River North
- In office May 12, 2009 – May 9, 2017
- Preceded by: Richard Neufeld
- Succeeded by: Dan Davies

Personal details
- Born: March 31, 1957 Fort St. John, British Columbia, Canada
- Died: September 18, 2024 (aged 67) Prince George, British Columbia, Canada
- Party: Independent (2016–); BC Liberal (2009–2016)
- Occupation: Instrumentation (oil and gas)

Patrick Joseph Pimm (March 31, 1957 – September 18, 2024) was a Canadian politician who served as a member of the Legislative Assembly of British Columbia (MLA) from 2009 to 2017. A member of the BC Liberal Party, he represented the riding of Peace River North.

Pimm lived in Fort St. John, British Columbia and had a business background working at an instrumentation company that specializes in the oil and gas sector. He spent 12 years on the Fort St. John city council before his election to the Legislative Assembly. In the 39th Parliament of British Columbia, Pimm served on several committees and first became involved with the Executive Council in October 2010 when former B.C. Premier Gordon Campbell appointed Pimm as the Parliamentary Secretary for the Natural Gas Initiative under the Ministry of Energy. When Christy Clark became Premier of British Columbia in March 2011, she retained Pimm at the same position.

Pimm was re-elected to his Peace River North riding in the 2013 provincial election and was appointed Minister of Agriculture on June 10, 2013, by Premier Clark. He previously served as Parliamentary Secretary for the Northeast and served as chair of the Northern Caucus and two Select Standing Committees: Aboriginal Affairs and Finance and Government Services. Pimm also served as a member of Treasury Board. A lifelong resident of the Peace River region, he served 12 years as councillor for the City of Fort St. John from 1993 to 2005. He was co-chair of the BC Oil and Gas Conference in 2002 and 2005, and he also served on a variety of other local community boards and committees.

== Background ==
Pat Pimm was born and raised in Fort St. John. He married at the age of 21 and raised two daughters. In 2005 he remarried to another woman, Jody, who had two grown sons. He established a career at an instrumentation business, Alpha Controls Ltd., specializing in the oil and gas sector. He spent 12 years on the Fort St. John city council, from 1993 to 2005. While on the council he advocated for the regionalization of services and the creation of a regional municipality. During a 2001 municipal referendum concerning a Fort St. John boundary expansion around a proposed manufacturing plant (oriented strand board), Pimm threatened to resign his council seat if the referendum failed. While on the council Pimm worked with the province and other municipalities in establishing the Fairshare grant program which redirected some oil and gas revenue to local governments in northeastern BC for use on infrastructure projects. He also supported the BC Lottery Corporation locating a gaming centre (bingo, off-track betting, slots and other electronic games) in Fort St. John.

Pimm died in Prince George, British Columbia on September 18, 2024, at the age of 67.

== Provincial politics ==
The appointment of MLA Richard Neufeld to the federal Senate of Canada in December 2008 by Prime Minister Stephen Harper created an opening in the BC provincial Peace River North riding. Such an opening was rare as Neufeld had represented the riding since 1991 and by Tony Brummet for the 12 years prior to Neufeld. There were five candidates in the race for the BC Liberal Party nomination: Chetwynd mayor Evan Saugstad, Fort St. John councillors Lori Ackerman and Dan Davies, School District trustee Linda Sewell, and Pat Pimm. With 1,200 BC Liberal members eligible to vote, Pimm won in the third round of preferential voting in March. He was soon thrust into the provincial election where he faced Fort Nelson town councilor and NDP candidate Jackie Allen, former chief of the Fort Nelson First Nation and Green Party candidate Liz Logan, and others. Pimm oriented his campaign around economic issues. Pimm won the Peace River North riding with 43% of the vote and his party formed a majority government.

As the 39th Parliament of British Columbia began, Pimm was not selected for the Executive Council by Premier Gordon Campbell. In the first two sessions Pimm was assigned to three parliamentary committees, though they rarely met. Pimm lobbied on behalf of the Peace River North riding to secure infrastructure grants for road construction and paving, recreation centre upgrades, and Fort St. John sewerage expansion. Pimm made headlines across the province in November 2009 when he criticized the Canadian Charter of Rights and Freedoms during a speech in the Legislature. He instead called for a "Bill of Responsibilities" to be established.

In 2010, as the petition to repeal the HST was very successful in his riding, Pimm became one of 24 MLAs targeted for recall by Bill Vander Zalm's FightHST group. However, several months later, his name was removed from the list as the group prioritized candidates for recall campaigns. In October, during Campbell's final cabinet shuffle before resigning, the post of Parliamentary Secretary for the Natural Gas Initiative was created for Pimm under the Ministry of Energy. In January 2011, with community opposition to a transfer move Oil and Gas Commission engineering jobs, from Fort St. John to Kelowna, Pimm intervened by arranging a public meeting with the Minister of Natural Resource Operations Steve Thomson, the CEO of the commission, as well as industry and public representatives, which resulted in several positions staying in Fort St. John. During the BC Liberal Party leadership election to replace Campbell, Pimm endorsed Kevin Falcon in mid-December citing Falcon's performance as Minister of Transportation where he directed significant funding to improving oil and gas resource roads and the Alaska Highway. In March 2011, after Christy Clark won the leadership election and was named Premier, she kept Pimm as Parliamentary Secretary for Natural Gas to the Minister of Energy and Mines. On June 27, 2011, he resigned from his Parliamentary Secretary position and from the BC Liberal caucus following a domestic dispute involving his wife which resulted in the RCMP detaining him overnight. A special prosecutor was assigned to his case given his status as an elected official. On July 13, the special prosecutor announced they would not be pressing charges and the BC Liberal caucus allowed Pimm to re-join. Pimm returned to his role as Parliamentary Secretary for Natural Gas and spent the summer consulting with stakeholders for what would become BC's Natural Gas Strategy and BC's Liquefied Natural Gas Strategy. In September 2012, he was made deputy whip, replacing Eric Foster who became whip.

In April 2013 at an all-candidates forum in Fort Nelson Pimm suggested that "grief" in the classroom caused by special needs children has caused public school enrolment to decline. He was quoted as saying "It's causing the teachers extra time and trouble and it's certainly, I think, is causing some students to move into other areas in the private sector as well".

In November 2015, Pimm stated he would not run for reelection in the coming provincial election in 2017.

On August 15, 2016, Pimm left his caucus and became an independent following his arrest for a charge of assault. Pimm agreed to be bound by a peace bond for eight months. The following year, Pimm's assault charge was stayed, and Pimm agreed to stay away from the complainant.

== Electoral history ==
2013 British Columbia general election: Peace River North
Party	Candidate	Votes	%	±%	Expenditures
Liberal	Pat Pimm	7,905	58.94	+15.79	$115,737
Independent	Arthur Austin Hadland	3,287	24.51	–6.82	$40,752
New Democratic	Judy Ann Fox-McGuire	1,319	9.84	–4.14	$36,341
Conservative	Wyeth Sigurdson	900	6.71	–	$882
Total valid votes		13,411	100.00		
Total rejected ballots		44	0.33		
Turnout		13,455	51.47		
Liberal hold		Swing		+11.30	
Source: Elections BC

B.C. General Election 2009: Peace River North
Party	Candidate	Votes	%	±	Expenditures
Liberal	Pat Pimm	3,992	43.15	n/a	$55,563
Independent	Arthur Hadland	2,899	31.33	n/a	$17,962
New Democrat	Jackie Allen	1,293	13.98	n/a	$17,855
Green	Liz Logan	1,010	10.92	n/a	$26,218
Refederation	Sue Arntson	58	0.62	n/a	$260
Total Valid Votes		9,252	100.00		
Total Rejected Ballots		52	0.6%		
Turnout		9,304	40%		

== Sources ==
- "Filed Financial Reports" (database). Financial Reports and Political Contributions System. Elections BC. 2009.
