= Dan Davies (politician) =

Canadian politician

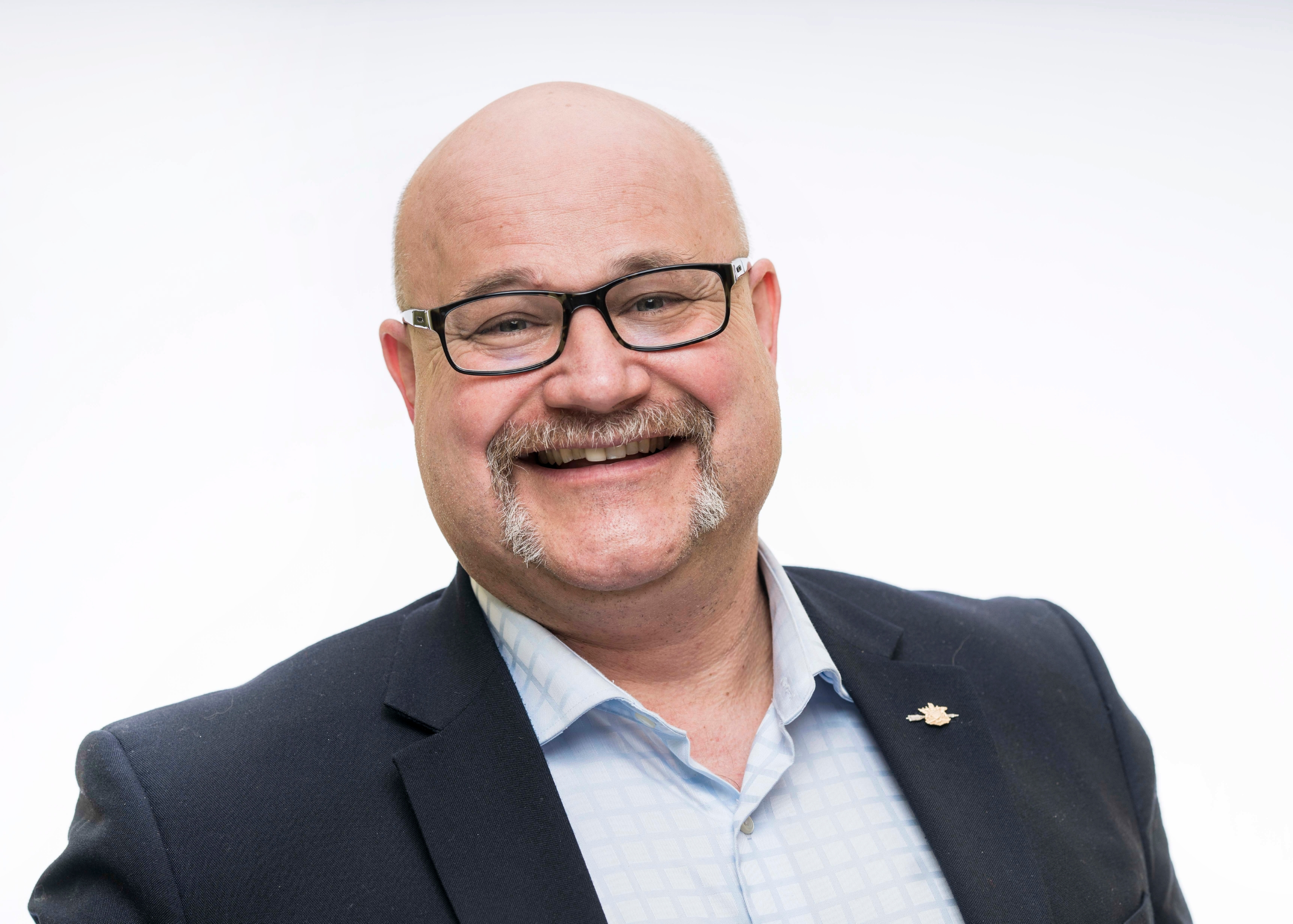
- Davies in 2020

Member of the British Columbia Legislative Assembly for Peace River North
- In office May 9, 2017 – September 21, 2024
- Preceded by: Pat Pimm
- Succeeded by: Jordan Kealy

Personal details
- Party: Independent (2024–present)
- Other political affiliations: BC United (before 2024)
- Education: Simon Fraser University (B.Ed.); Gonzaga University

Dan Davies is a Canadian politician who served as a member of the Legislative Assembly of British Columbia (MLA) representing the electoral district of Peace River North from 2017 to 2024. A member of the BC Liberals (later BC United), he represented the riding of Peace River North. In Opposition, he served as the critic for Education and as the critic for Social Development and Poverty Reduction.

== Early career and education ==
Davies has a bachelor of education (B.Ed.) from Simon Fraser University and a master's degree in leadership from Gonzaga University. He worked as an elementary school teacher at Duncan Cran and truck driver before entering politics.

== Political career ==
Prior to his election to the legislature, Davies served as a Fort St. John city councillor for 12 years.

Davies was first elected as an MLA in the 2017 general election, representing Peace River North as a member of the BC Liberals. The BC liberals later changed their name to BC United.

In the 2024 general election, Davies ran as an independent candidate after the withdrawal of BC United from the election but was defeated by BC Conservative candidate Jordan Kealy.

== Electoral history ==
2024 British Columbia general election: Peace River North
Party	Candidate	Votes	%	±%	Expenditures
Conservative	Jordan Kealy	11,213	74.36	+40.06	$33,050.72
Independent	Dan Davies	3,038	20.15	–	$29,326.39
New Democratic	Ian McMahon	828	5.49	-4.44	$1,180.64
Total valid votes/expense limit		15,079	99.88	–	$71,700.08
Total rejected ballots		18	0.12	–	
Turnout		15,097	57.16	+10.68	
Registered voters		26,413			
Conservative gain from BC United		Swing		–	
Incumbent MLA Dan Davies was originally nominated as the BC United candidate, but ran as an independent after BC United suspended its campaign.
Source: Elections BC

2020 British Columbia general election: Peace River North
Party	Candidate	Votes	%	±%	Expenditures
Liberal	Dan Davies	6,746	55.76	−10.51	$32,293.82
Conservative	Trevor Bolin	4,150	34.30	–	$0.00
New Democratic	Danielle Monroe	1,202	9.94	+3.37	$739.00
Total valid votes		12,098	99.29	–	
Total rejected ballots		86	0.71		
Turnout		12,184	46.48		
Registered voters		26,216			
Source: Elections BC

2017 British Columbia general election: Peace River North
Party	Candidate	Votes	%	±%	Expenditures
Liberal	Dan Davies	9,707	66.27	+7.33	$53,883
Independent	Bob Fedderly	2,785	19.01	–	$31,928
New Democratic	Robert Dempsey	962	6.57	−3.27	$1,739
Independent	Rob Fraser	917	6.27	–	$25,354
Independent	Jeff Richert	275	1.88	–	$1,064
Total valid votes		14,646	100.00		
Total rejected ballots		65	0.44		
Turnout		14,711	56.74		
Source: Elections BC
