= Peace River Bridge (British Columbia) =

Coordinates: 56.1375°N 120.6722°W

- Interactive map of Peace River Bridge
- Location: Taylor, British Columbia, Canada

History
- Built: 1960

The Peace River Bridge is a bridge near Taylor, British Columbia, Canada crossing the Peace River. It replaced the Peace River Suspension Bridge, which collapsed on October 16, 1957.

The bridge carries road traffic and is part of the Alaska Highway, designated British Columbia Highway 97. It is a metal bridge deck, which requires welding 2-4 times a year. There are talks of replacing the bridge to a new, four lane bridge, but it is still in the consultation progress.
