= Peace River Suspension Bridge =

Bridge in Taylor, British Columbia, Canada

Coordinates: 56.1376°N 120.6744°W

The Peace River Suspension Bridge was a bridge near Taylor, British Columbia, Canada, crossing the Peace River. It opened in 1943 and collapsed on October 16, 1957, with no injuries or fatalities recorded. When it opened, it was the longest bridge on the Alaska highway at 649 m (2,130 feet). When it collapsed, traffic was detoured over the railway trestle. It has since been replaced by the Peace River Bridge.
