= Rotary-screw compressor =

Gas compressor using a rotary positive-displacement mechanism

Principal view of the pumping action of a twin-screw pump with a six-lobe female screw and a five-lobe male screw. A compressor (as opposed to a pump) would be shaped the same way, except that the shape of the lobes would change along the length of the screw, so that the volume of the trapped pockets would get squeezed smaller as they get closer to the exhaust port.

Rotary-screw air compressor internal view

A rotary-screw compressor is a type of gas compressor, such as an air compressor, that uses a rotary-type positive-displacement mechanism. These compressors are common in industrial applications and replace more traditional piston compressors where larger volumes of compressed gas are needed, e.g. for large refrigeration cycles such as chillers, or for compressed air systems to operate air-driven tools such as jackhammers and impact wrenches. For smaller rotor sizes the inherent leakage in the rotors becomes much more significant, leading to this type of mechanism being less suitable for smaller compressors than piston compressors.

The screw compressor is identical to the screw pump except that the pockets of trapped material get progressively smaller along the screw, thus compressing the material held within the pockets. Thus the screw of a screw compressor is asymmetrical along its length, while a screw pump is symmetrical all the way.

The gas compression process of a rotary screw is a continuous sweeping motion, so there is very little pulsation or surging of flow, as occurs with piston compressors. This also allows screw compressors to be significantly quieter and produce much less vibration than piston compressors, even at large sizes, and produces some benefits in efficiency.

== Working ==
Cross-section through the rotors of a typical screw compressor with a male rotor having 5 lobes and a female rotor having 6. For five rotations of the female rotor, the male rotor makes six rotations. Click here for the animated diagram.

Rotary-screw compressors use two very closely meshing spiral rotors to compress the gas. In a dry-running rotary-screw compressor, timing gears ensure that the male and female rotors maintain precise alignment without contact which would produce rapid wear. In an oil-flooded rotary-screw compressor, lubricating oil bridges the space between the rotors, both providing a hydraulic seal and transferring mechanical energy between the rotors, allowing one rotor to be entirely driven by the other.

Gas enters at the suction side and moves through the threads as the screws rotate. The meshing rotors force the gas through the compressor, and the gas exits at the end of the screws. The working area is the inter-lobe volume between the male and female rotors. It is larger at the intake end, and decreases along the length of the rotors until the exhaust port. This change in volume is the compression.

The intake charge is drawn in at the end of the rotors in the large clearance between the male and female lobes. At the intake end the male lobe is much smaller than its female counterpart, but the relative sizes reverse proportions along the lengths of both rotors (the male becomes larger and the female smaller) until (tangential to the discharge port) the clearance space between each pair of lobes is much smaller. This reduction in volume causes compression of the charge before being presented to the output manifold.

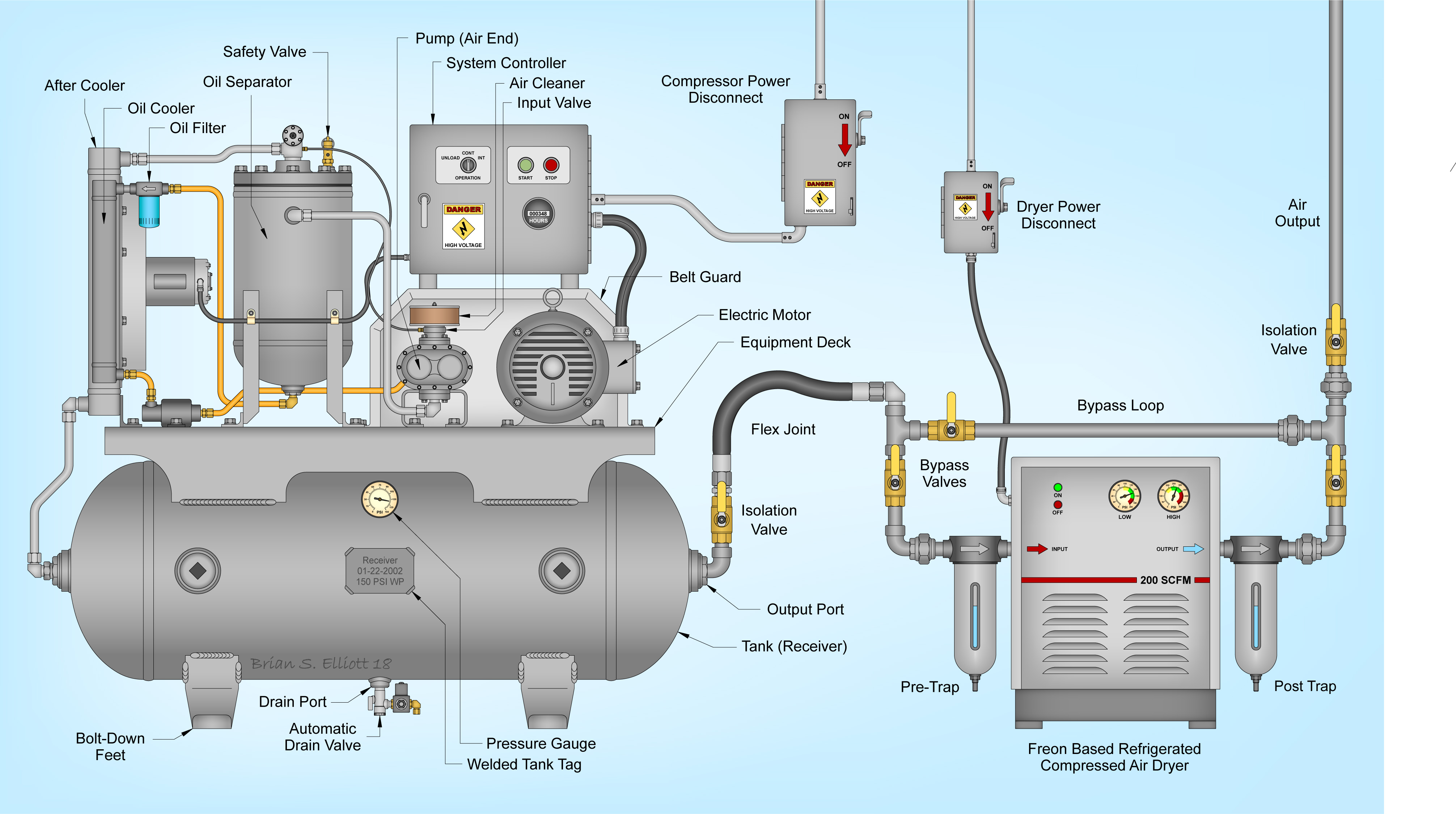
Technical Illustration of Rotary-Screw Compression system

The effectiveness of this mechanism is dependent on precisely fitting clearances between the spiral rotors and between the rotors and the chamber for sealing of the compression cavities. However, some leakage is inevitable, and high rotational speeds must be used to minimize the ratio of leakage flow rate over effective flow rate.

In contrast to Roots blowers, modern screw compressors are made with different profiles on the two rotors: the male rotor has convex lobes which mesh with the concave cavities of the female rotor. Usually the male rotor has fewer lobes than the female rotor, so that it rotates faster. Originally, screw compressors were made with symmetrical rotor cavity profiles, but modern versions use asymmetrical rotors, with the exact rotor designs being the subject of patents.

== Size ==
The capacities of rotary-screw compressors are typically rated in horsepower (HP), Standard Cubic Feet per Minute (SCFM)* and pounds per square inch gauge (PSIG.) For units in the 5 through 30 HP range the physical size of these units are comparable to a typical two-stage compressor. As horsepower increases, there is a substantial economy of scale in favor of the rotary-screw compressors. As an example, a 250 HP compound compressor is a large piece of equipment that generally requires a special foundation, building accommodations and highly trained riggers to place the equipment. On the other hand, a 250 HP rotary-screw compressor can be placed on an ordinary shop floor using a standard forklift. Within industry, a 250 HP rotary-screw compressor is generally considered to be a compact piece of equipment.

Rotary-screw compressors are commonly available in the 5 through 500 HP range and can produce air flows in excess of 2500 SCFM. While the pressure produced by a single-stage screw compressor is limited to 250 PSIG, a two-stage screw compressor can deliver pressures of up to 600 PSIG.

Rotary-screw compressors tend to be smooth running with limited vibration, thus not requiring a specialized foundation or mounting system. Normally, rotary-screw compressors are mounted using standard rubber isolation mounts designed to absorb high-frequency vibrations. This is especially true in rotary-screw compressors that operate at high rotational speeds.

*To a lesser extent, some compressors are rated in Actual Cubic Feet per Minute (ACFM). Still others are rated in Cubic Feet per Minute (CFM). Using CFM to rate a compressor is incorrect because it represents a flow rate that is independent of a pressure reference. i.e. 20 CFM at 60 PSI.

== History ==
The screw compressor was first patented in 1878 by Heinrich Krigar in Germany, however the patent expired without a working machine being built.

The modern helical lobe screw compressor was developed in Sweden by Alf Lysholm who was the chief engineer at Ljungstroms Angturbin. Lysholm developed the screw compressor while looking for a way to overcome compressor surge in gas turbines. Lysholm first considered a Roots type blower but found this was unable to generate a high enough pressure ratio. In 1935, Ljungstroms patented a helical lobe screw compressor which was then widely licensed to other manufacturers. Ljungstroms Angturbin AB was renamed Svenska Rotor Maskiner (SRM) in 1951.

In 1952, the first Holroyd cutting machine was used, by the Scottish engineering company Howden, to produce helical lobe compressor rotors greatly reducing both cost and manufacturing time.

In 1954, Howden and SRM jointly developed the first oil flooded screw compressor. Flooding provided both cooling, which allowed higher pressure ratios, and the elimination of timing gears. The first commercially available flooded screw air compressor was introduced in 1957 by Atlas Copco.

Slot valves were developed by SRM in the 1950s, allowing for improvements in capacity control which had been a limiting factor for screw compressor application.

Asymmetric rotors were first patented by SRM and subsequently introduced commercially by Sullair in 1969. The introduction of asymmetric rotors improved sealing, further increasing the types efficiency.

== Applications ==
Rotary-screw compressors are generally used to supply compressed air for larger industrial applications. They are best applied in applications that have a continuous air demand such as food packaging plants and automated manufacturing systems although a large enough number of intermittent demands, along with some storage, will also present a suitably continuous load. In addition to fixed units, rotary-screw compressors are commonly mounted on tow-behind trailers and powered with small diesel engines. These portable compression systems are typically referred to as construction compressors. Construction compressors are used to provide compressed air to jack hammers, riveting tools, pneumatic pumps, sand blasting operations and industrial paint systems. They are commonly seen at construction sites and on duty with road repair crews throughout the world.

Screw air compressors are also commonly used on Rotary, DTH and RC drill rigs used in mining production and exploration drilling applications and in oil and gas pipeline services such as pneumatic testing or air pigging.

=== Oil-free ===
In an oil-free compressor, the air is compressed entirely through the action of the screws, without the assistance of an oil seal. They usually have lower maximal discharge pressure capability as a result. However, multi-stage oil-free compressors, where the air is compressed by several sets of screws, can achieve pressures of over 150 psi (10 atm) and output volume of over 2,000 cubic feet per minute (57 m^{3}/min).

Oil-free compressors are used in applications where entrained oil carry-over is not acceptable, such as medical research and semiconductor manufacturing. However, this does not preclude the need for filtration, as hydrocarbons and other contaminants ingested from the ambient air must also be removed prior to the point of use. Consequently, air treatment identical to that used for an oil-flooded screw compressor is frequently required to ensure quality compressed air.

Some small piston compressors use the term "oil free" to refer simply to the use of Teflon-type coatings on wear surfaces.

=== Oil-injected ===
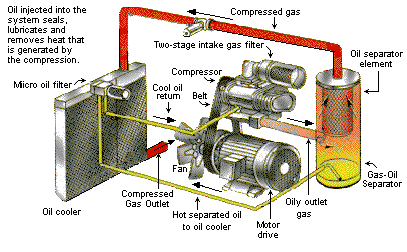
Diagram of a rotary-screw compressor

In an oil-injected rotary-screw compressor, oil is injected into the compression cavities to aid sealing and provide cooling for the gas charge. The oil is separated from the discharge stream, cooled, filtered and recycled. The oil captures non-polar particulates from the incoming air, effectively reducing the particle loading of compressed-air particulate filtration. It is usual for some entrained compressor oil to carry into the compressed-gas stream downstream of the compressor. In many applications, this is rectified by coalescer/filter vessels. Refrigerated compressed air dryers with internal cold coalescing filters are rated to remove more oil and water than coalescing filters that are downstream of air dryers, because after the air is cooled and the moisture is removed, the cold air is used to pre-cool the hot entering air, which warms the exiting air. In other applications, this is rectified by the use of receiver tanks that reduce the local velocity of compressed air, allowing oil to condense, drop out of the air stream, and to be removed from the compressed-air system by condensate-management equipment.

Oil flooded screw compressors are used in a wide variety of applications including air compression, gas refrigeration, hydrocarbon processing and power utilization from low-grade heat sources. Sizes range from small workshop air compressors to 8,400 kW (11,300 hp) heavy industrial compressors with output pressures as high as 60 bar (870 psi). New oil flooded screw air compressors release <5 mg/m3 of oil carryover.

==== Lubricants, polyalkylene glycol (PAG), polyalphaolefin (PAO), mineral oils ====
PAG oil is polyalkylene glycol which is also called polyglycol. Some versions are food grade and biodegradable. PAG lubricants are used by the two largest U.S. air compressor OEMs in rotary screw air compressors. PAG oil-injected compressors are not used to spray paint, because PAG oil will dissolve many paints. Reaction-hardening two-component epoxy resin paints are resistant to PAG oil.

Polyglycols are not compatible with mineral oil based greases. A mixture of polyglycols with mineral oils results is a gelatinous, gooey mess. Silicone grease does tolerate Polyglycols. One pneumatic controls manufacturer puts silicone grease on the seals and gaskets.

Mineral oil (but not polyalkylene glycol oil) lubricated compressors are recommended for mineral oil greases coated seals, such as pneumatic high speed 4-way valves and air cylinders that operate without mineral oiler lubricators. One manufacturer has rated its pneumatic high speed 4-way valves with a life of 50 million cycles, if not exposed to polyglycol oils.

Polyalphaolefin PAO oil is compatible with mineral oil greases.

=== Conical screw compressor ===
The relatively recently developed conical screw compressor is in effect a conical spiral extension of a gerotor. It does not have the inherent "blow-hole" leakage path which, in well designed screw compressors, is responsible for significant leakage through the assembly. This allows much smaller rotors to have practical efficiency since at smaller sizes the leakage area does not become as large a portion of the pumping area as in straight screw compressors. In conjunction with the decreasing diameter of the cone shaped rotor this also allows much higher compression ratios in a single stage with lower output pulsation.

== Control schemes ==
Among rotary-screw compressors, there are multiple control schemes, each with differing advantages and disadvantages.

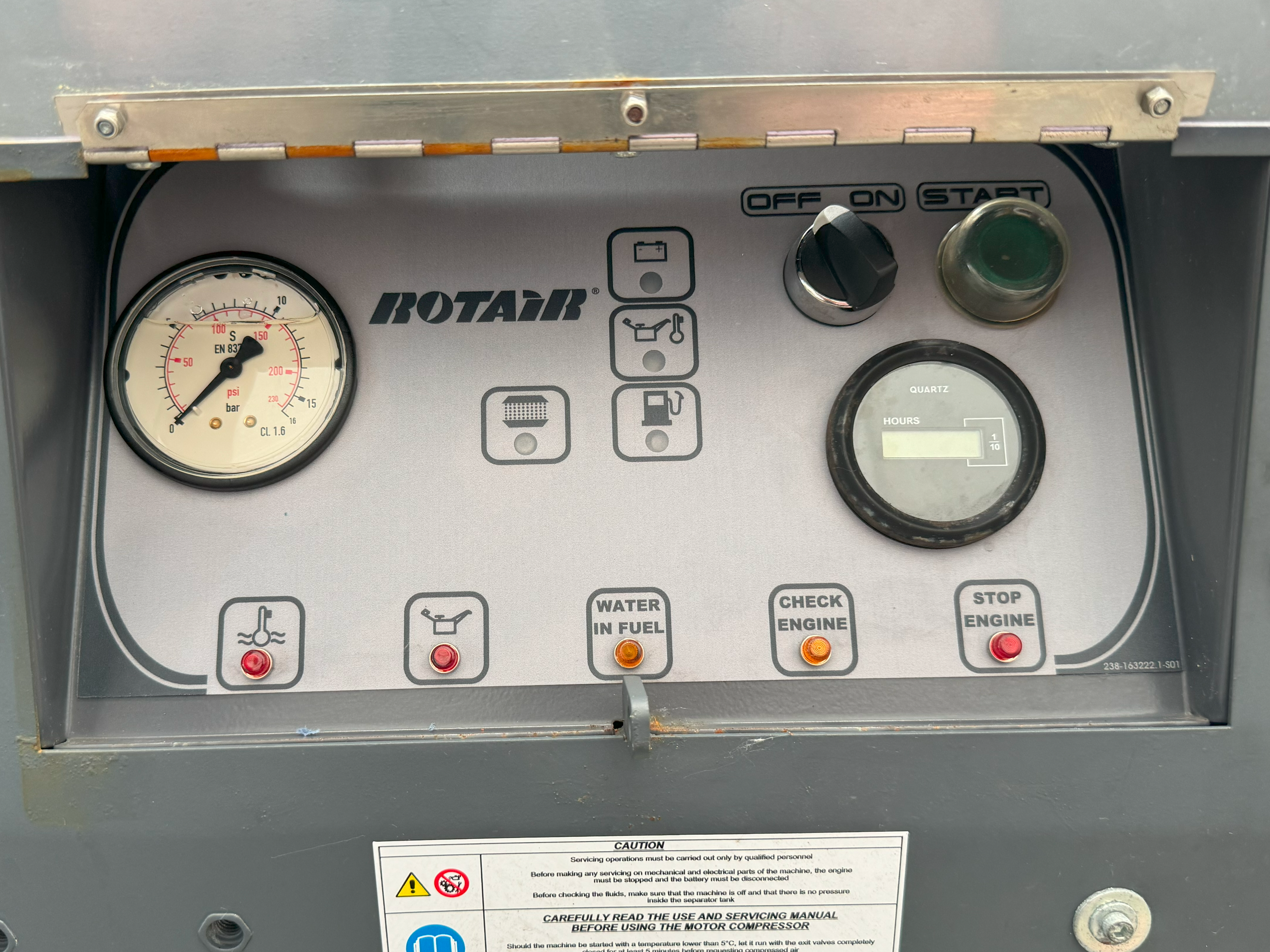
Start/Stop panel of the MDVN83KH by LastMile Fibre and Rotair

=== Start/stop ===
In a start/stop control scheme, compressor controls actuate relays to apply and remove power to the motor according to compressed air needs. Significant storage is required in most usage cases if the load is intermittent or is poorly matched to the compressor; the storage required will often be larger than the compressor itself.

=== Load/unload ===
In a load/unload control scheme, the compressor remains continuously powered. However, when the demand for compressed air is satisfied or reduced, instead of disconnecting power to the compressor, a device known as a slide valve is activated. This device uncovers part of the rotor and proportionately reduces capacity of the machine down to typically 25% of the compressor's capability, thereby unloading the compressor. This reduces the number of start/stop cycles for electric motors over a start/stop control scheme in electrically driven compressors, improving equipment service life with a minimal change in operating cost. When a load/unload control scheme is combined with a timer to stop the compressor after a predetermined period of continuously unloaded operation, it is known as a dual-control or auto-dual scheme. This control scheme still requires storage since there are only two production rates available to match consumption, although significantly less than a start/stop scheme. Most diesel powered air compressors, uses this method.

=== Modulation ===
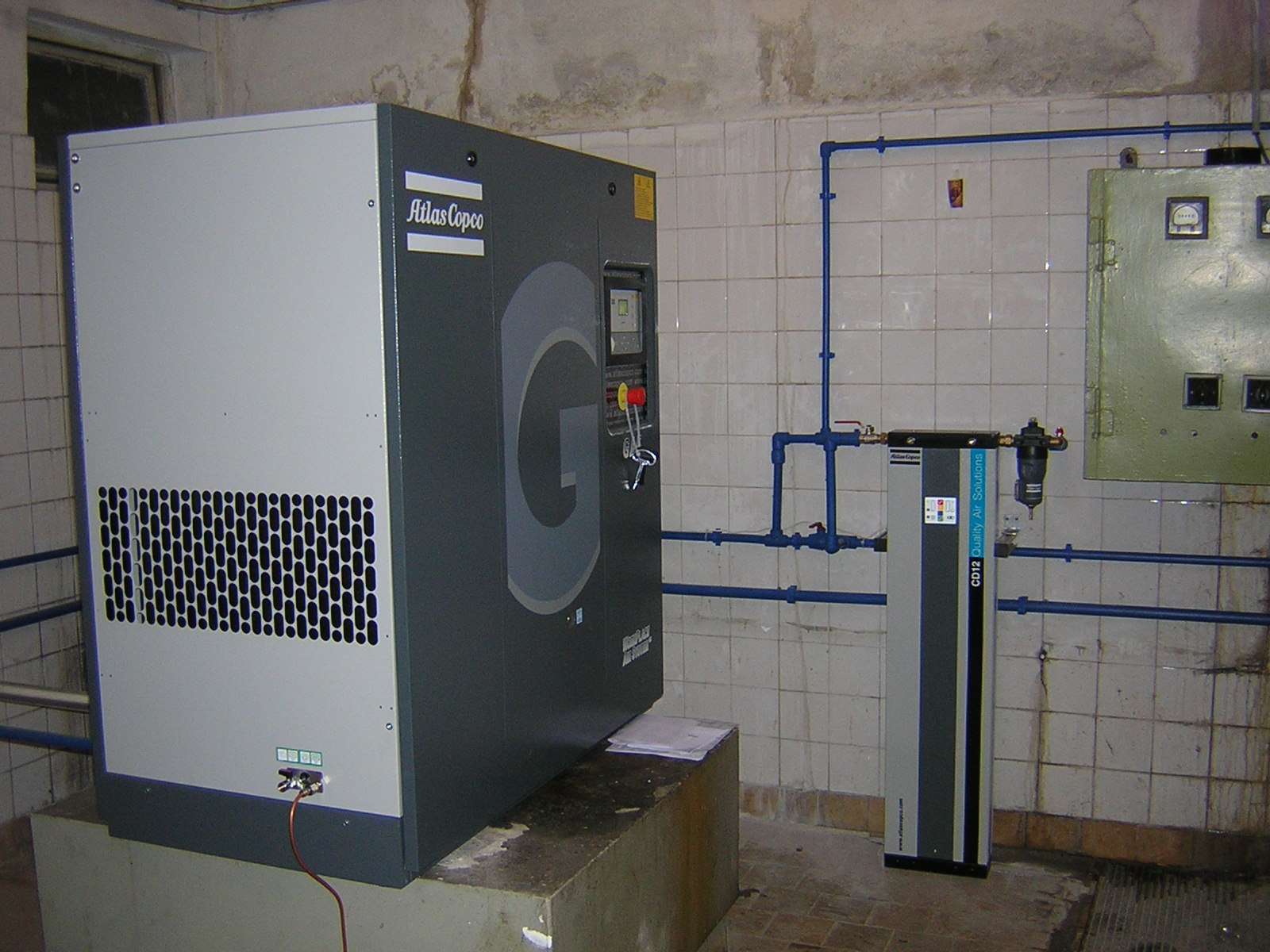
Rotary-screw air compressor in a housing for sound attenuation

Instead of starting and stopping the compressor, a slide valve as described above continuously modulates capacity to the demand rather than being controlled in steps. While this yields a consistent discharge pressure over a wide range of demand, overall power consumption may be higher than with a load/unload scheme, resulting in approximately 70% of full-load power consumption when the compressor is at a zero-load condition.

Due to the limited adjustment in compressor power consumption relative to compressed-air output capacity, modulation is a generally inefficient method of control when compared to variable-speed drives. However, for applications where it is not readily possible to frequently cease and resume operation of the compressor (such as when a compressor is driven by an internal-combustion engine and operated without the presence of a compressed-air receiver), modulation is suitable. The continuously variable production rate also eliminates the need for significant storage if the load never exceeds the compressor capacity.

=== Variable displacement ===
Utilized by compressor companies Quincy Compressor, Kobelco, Gardner Denver, Kaishan USA, and Sullair, variable displacement alters the percentage of the screw compressor rotors working to compress air by allowing air flow to bypass portions of the screws. While this does reduce power consumption when compared to a modulation control scheme, a load/unload system can be more effective with large amounts of storage (10 gallons per CFM). If a large amount of storage is not practical, a variable-displacement system can be very effective, especially at greater than 70% of full load.

One way that variable displacement may be accomplished is by using multiple lifting valves on the suction side of the compressor, each plumbed to a corresponding location on the discharge. In automotive superchargers, this is analogous to the operation of a bypass valve.

=== Variable speed ===
While an air compressor powered by a variable-speed drive can offer the lowest operating-energy cost without any appreciable reduction in service life over a properly maintained load/unload compressor, the variable-frequency power inverter of a variable-speed drive typically adds significant cost to the design of such a compressor, reducing its economic benefits over a properly sized load/unload compressor if air demand is constant. However, a variable-speed drive provides for a nearly linear relationship between compressor power consumption and free air delivery allowing the most efficient operation over a very wide range of air demand. The compressor will still have to enter start/stop mode for very low demand as efficiency still drops off rapidly at low production rates due to rotor leakage. In harsh environments (hot, humid or dusty) the electronics of variable-speed drives may have to be protected to retain expected service life.

== Superchargers ==
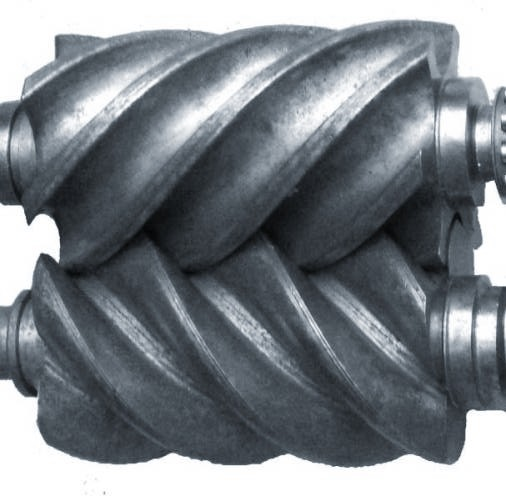
Lysholm screws. Note the complex shape of each screw. The screws run at high speed and with closely engineered tolerances.

The twin-screw type supercharger is a positive displacement type device that operates by pushing air through a pair of meshing close-tolerance screws similar to a set of worm gears. Twin-screw superchargers are also known as Lysholm superchargers (or compressors) after their inventor, Alf Lysholm. Each rotor is radially symmetrical, but laterally asymmetric. By comparison, conventional "Roots" type blowers have either identical rotors (with straight rotors) or mirror-image rotors (with helixed rotors). The Whipple-manufactured male rotor has three lobes, the female five lobes. The Kenne-Bell male rotor has four lobes, the female six lobes. Females in some earlier designs had four. By comparison, Roots blowers always have the same number of lobes on both rotors, typically 2, 3 or 4.

=== Comparative advantages ===
The rotary screw compressor has low leakage levels and low parasitic losses vs. Roots type. The supercharger is typically driven directly from the engine's crankshaft via a belt or gear drive. Unlike the Roots type supercharger, the twin-screw exhibits internal compression which is the ability of the device to compress air within the housing as it is moved through the device instead of relying upon resistance to flow downstream of the discharge to establish an increase of pressure.

The requirement of high-precision computer-controlled manufacturing techniques makes the screw type supercharger a more expensive alternative to other forms of available forced induction. With later technology, manufacturing cost has been lowered while performance increased.

All supercharger types benefit from the use of an intercooler to reduce heat produced during pumping and compression.

A clear example of the technology applied by the twin-screw in companies like Ford, Mazda, Mercedes and Mercury Marine can also demonstrate the effectiveness of the twin screw. While some centrifugal superchargers are consistent and reliable, they typically do not produce full boost until near peak engine rpm, while positive displacement superchargers such as Roots type superchargers and twin-screw types offer more immediate boost. In addition to this, twin-screw superchargers can keep the reasonable boost to higher rpm better than other positive displacement supercharges.

=== Related terms ===
The term "blower" is commonly used to define a device placed on engines with a functional need for additional airflow, such as a 2-stroke Diesel engine, where positive intake pressure is needed to "scavenge", or clear spent exhaust gasses from the cylinder and force a fresh intake charge into the cylinder before the compression stroke. The term "blower" is applied to rotary screw, roots-type, and centrifugal compressors when utilized as part of an automotive forced induction system. The term 'cabin blower' is also used for the pressurisation of aircraft for high altitude flight, which used Roots type compressors particularly in the 1950s (see Marshall supercharger).

== See also ==
- Gas compressor
- Guided-rotor compressor
- Reciprocating compressor
- Vapor-compression refrigeration
- Variable-speed air compressor
