= Electrostatic precipitator =

Filtration device

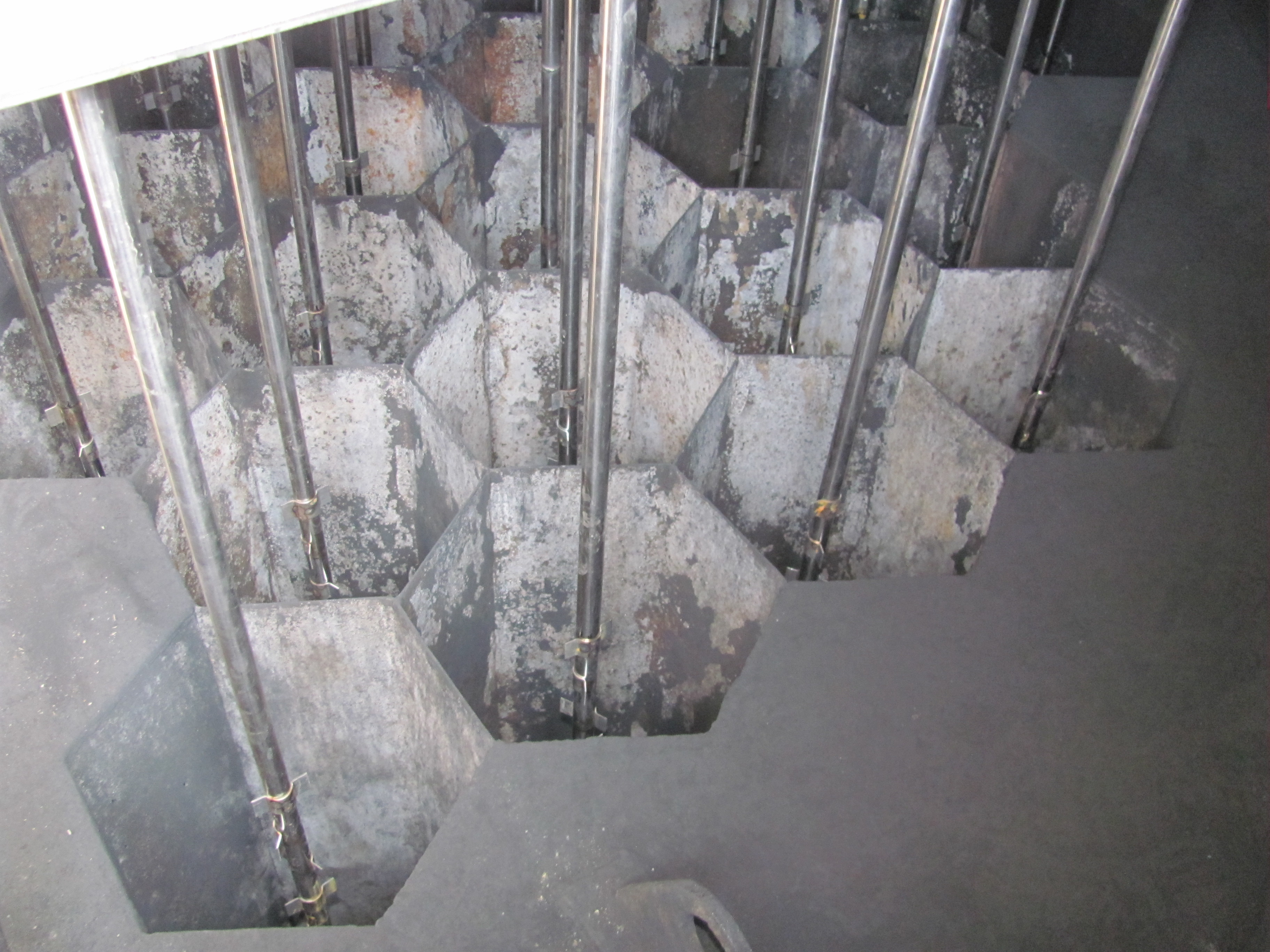
Electrodes inside electrostatic precipitator

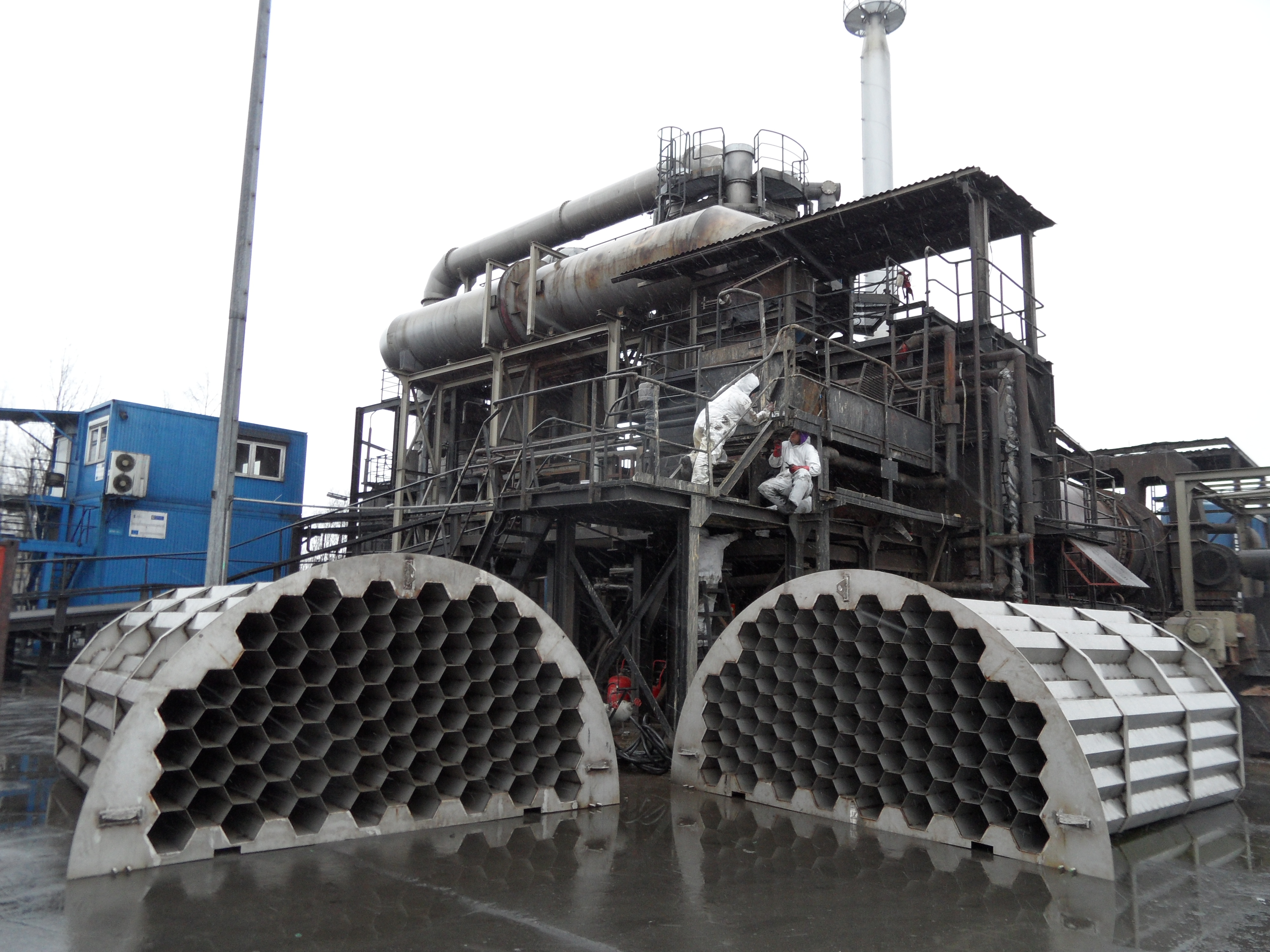
Collection electrode of an electrostatic precipitator in a waste incineration plant

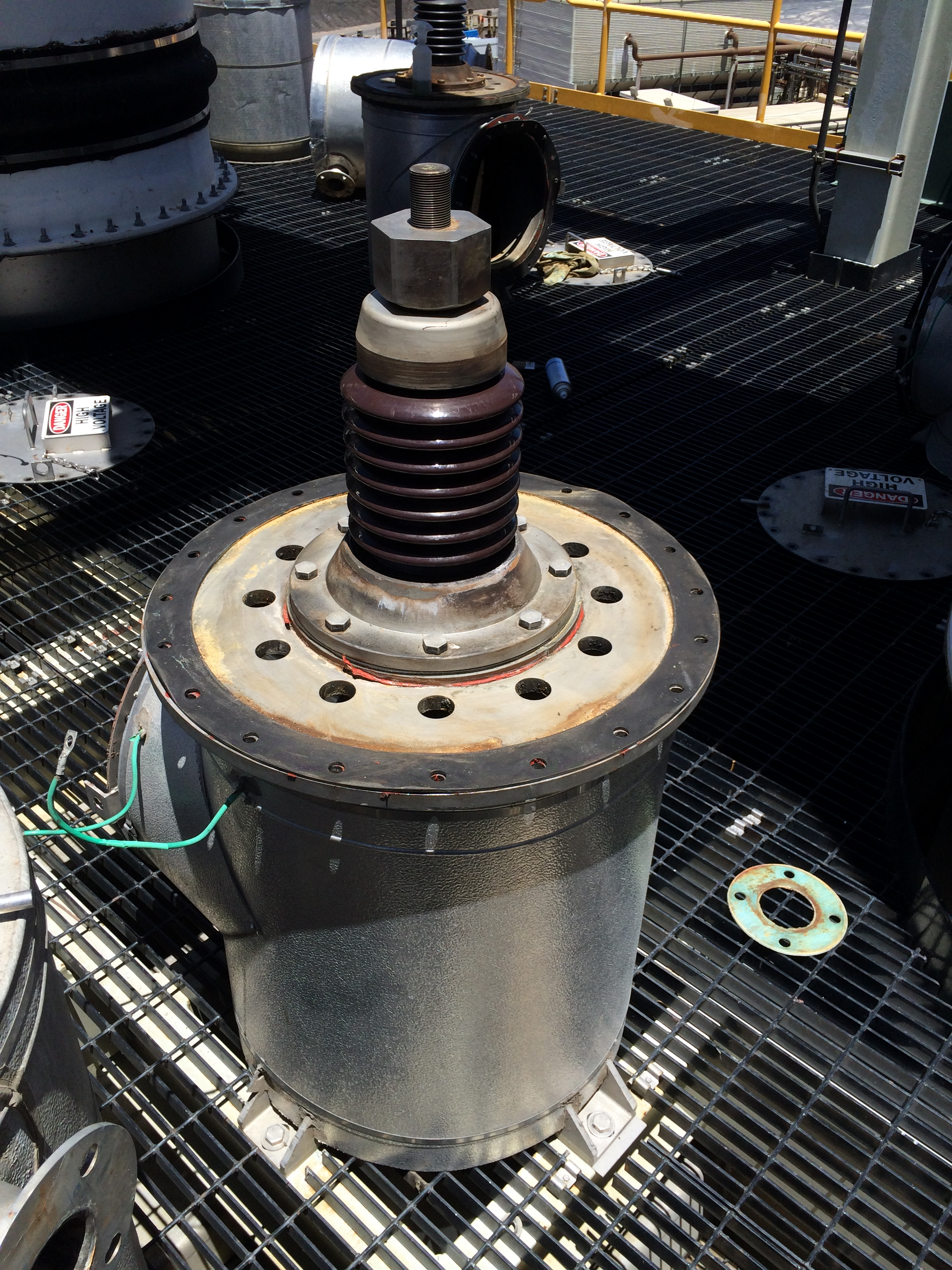
Insulator assembly with housing and high voltage bus removed for maintenance and inspection. Insulators are typically used to hold up the electrode fields between the grounded collection plates.

An electrostatic precipitator (ESP) is a filterless device that removes fine particles, such as dust and smoke, from a flowing gas using the force of an induced electrostatic charge minimally impeding the flow of gases through the unit.

In contrast to wet scrubbers, which apply energy directly to the flowing fluid medium, an ESP applies energy only to the particulate matter being collected and therefore is very efficient in its consumption of energy (in the form of electricity).

== Invention ==
The first use of corona discharge to remove particles from an aerosol was by Hohlfeld in 1824. However, it was not commercialized until almost a century later.

In 1907 Frederick Gardner Cottrell, a professor of chemistry at the University of California, Berkeley, applied for a patent on a device for charging particles and then collecting them through electrostatic attraction—the first recorded electrostatic precipitator. Cottrell first applied the device to the collection of sulphuric acid mist and lead oxide fumes emitted from various acid-making and smelting activities. Wine-producing vineyards in northern California were being adversely affected by the lead emissions.

At the time of Cottrell's invention, the theoretical basis for operation was not understood. The operational theory was developed later in Germany, with the work of Walter Deutsch and the formation of the Lurgi company.

Cottrell used proceeds from his invention to fund scientific research through the creation of a foundation called Research Corporation in 1912, to which he assigned the patents. The intent of the organization was to bring inventions made by educators (such as Cottrell) into the commercial world for the benefit of society at large. The operation of Research Corporation is funded by royalties paid by commercial firms after commercialization occurs. Research Corporation has provided funding to many scientific projects: Goddard's rocketry experiments, Lawrence's cyclotron, production methods for vitamins A and B_{1}, among many others.

Research Corporation set territories for manufacturers of this technology, which included Western Precipitation (Los Angeles), Lodge-Cottrell (England), Lurgi Apparatebau-Gesellschaft (Germany), and Japanese Cottrell Corp. (Japan), and was a clearinghouse for any process improvements. However, anti-trust concerns forced Research Corporation to eliminate territory restrictions in 1946.

Electrophoresis is the term used for migration of gas-suspended charged particles in a direct-current electrostatic field. Traditional CRT television sets tend to accumulate dust on the screen because of this phenomenon (a CRT is a direct-current machine operating at about 15 kilovolts).

== Types ==
There are two main types of precipitators:

- High-voltage, single-stage - Single-stage precipitators combine an ionization and a collection step. They are commonly referred to as Cottrell precipitators.
- Low-voltage, two-stage - Two-stage precipitators use a similar principle; however, the ionizing section is followed by collection plates.

Described below is the high-voltage, single-stage precipitator, which is widely used in minerals processing operations. The low-voltage, two-stage precipitator is generally used for filtration in air-conditioning systems.

=== Plate and bar ===
The majority of electrostatic precipitators installed are the plate type. Particles are collected on flat, parallel surfaces that are 8 to 12 in. (20 to 30 cm) apart, with a series of discharge electrodes spaced along the centerline of two adjacent plates. The contaminated gases pass through the passage between the plates, and the particles become charged and adhere to the collection plates. Collected particles are usually removed by rapping the plates and deposited in bins or hoppers at the base of the precipitator.

Conceptual diagram of a plate and bar electrostatic precipitator

The most basic precipitator contains a row of thin vertical wires, and followed by a stack of large flat metal plates oriented vertically, with the plates typically spaced about 1 cm to 18 cm apart, depending on the application. The air stream flows horizontally through the spaces between the wires, and then passes through the stack of plates.

A negative voltage of several thousand volts is applied between wire and plate. If the applied voltage is high enough, an electric corona discharge ionizes the air around the electrodes, which then ionizes the particles in the air stream.

The ionized particles, due to the electrostatic force, are diverted towards the grounded plates. Particles build up on the collection plates and are removed from the air stream.

A two-stage design (separate charging section ahead of the collecting section) has the benefit of minimizing ozone production, which would adversely affect the health of personnel working in enclosed spaces. For shipboard engine rooms where gearboxes generate an oil mist, two-stage ESP's are used to clean the air, improving the operating environment and preventing buildup of flammable oil fog accumulations. Collected oil is returned to the gear lubricating system.

=== Tubular ===
Tubular precipitators consist of cylindrical collection electrodes with discharge electrodes located on the axis of the cylinder. The contaminated gases flow around the discharge electrode and up through the inside of the cylinders. The charged particles are collected on the grounded walls of the cylinder. The collected dust is removed from the bottom of the cylinder.

Tubular precipitators are often used for mist or fog collection or for adhesive, sticky, radioactive, or extremely toxic materials.

== Components ==
The four main components of all electrostatic precipitators are:

- Power supply unit, to provide high-voltage DC power
- Ionizing section, to impart a charge to particulates in the gas stream
- A means of removing the collected particulates
- A housing to enclose the precipitator zone

The collected material on the electrodes is removed by rapping or vibrating the collecting electrodes either continuously or at a predetermined interval. Cleaning a precipitator can usually be done without interrupting the airflow.

== Collection efficiency (R) ==
The following factors affect the efficiency of electrostatic precipitators:

- Larger collection-surface areas and lower gas-flow rates increase efficiency because of the increased time available for electrical activity to treat the dust particles.
- An increase in the dust-particle migration velocity to the collecting electrodes increases efficiency. The migration velocity can be increased by:
  - Decreasing the gas viscosity
  - Increasing the gas temperature
  - Increasing the voltage field

Precipitator performance is very sensitive to two particulate properties: 1) electrical resistivity; and 2) particle size distribution. These properties can be measured economically and accurately in the laboratory, using standard tests. Resistivity can be determined as a function of temperature in accordance with IEEE Standard 548. This test is conducted in an air environment containing a specified moisture concentration. The test is run as a function of ascending or descending temperature, or both. Data is acquired using an average ash layer electric field of 4 kV/cm. Since relatively low applied voltage is used and no sulfuric acid vapor is present in the test environment, the values obtained indicate the maximum ash resistivity.

In an ESP, where particle charging and discharging are key functions, resistivity is an important factor that significantly affects collection efficiency. While resistivity is an important phenomenon in the inter-electrode region where most particle charging takes place, it has a particularly important effect on the dust layer at the collection electrode where discharging occurs. Particles that exhibit high resistivity are difficult to charge. But once charged, they do not readily give up their acquired charge on arrival at the collection electrode. On the other hand, particles with low resistivity easily become charged and readily release their charge to the grounded collection plate. Both extremes in resistivity impede the efficient functioning of ESPs. ESPs work best under normal resistivity conditions.

Resistivity, which is a characteristic of particles in an electric field, is a measure of a particle's resistance to transferring charge (both accepting and giving up charges). Resistivity is a function of a particle's chemical composition as well as flue gas operating conditions such as temperature and moisture. Particles can have high, moderate (normal), or low resistivity.

Bulk resistivity is defined using a more general version of Ohm’s Law, as given in Equation (1) below:

$\vec E = {\rho}\, \vec j$	1

 Where:
 E is the Electric field strength.Unit:-(V/cm);
 j is the Current density.Unit:-(A/cm2); and
 ρ is the Resistivity.Unit:-(Ohm-cm)

A better way of displaying this would be to solve for resistivity as a function of applied voltage and current, as given in Equation (2) below:

$\rho = \frac {AV} {Il}$	2

 Where:
 ρ = Resistivity.Unit:-(Ohm-cm)
 V = The applied DC potential.Unit:-(Volts);
 I = The measured current.Unit:-(Amperes);
 l = The ash layer thickness.Unit:-(cm); and
 A = The current measuring electrode face area.Unit:-(cm2).

Resistivity is the electrical resistance of a dust sample 1.0 cm^{2} in cross-sectional area, 1.0 cm thick, and is recorded in units of ohm-cm. A method for measuring resistivity will be described in this article. The table below, gives value ranges for low, normal, and high resistivity.

Resistivity	Range of Measurement
Low	between 10^{4} and 10^{7} ohm-cm
Normal	between 10^{7} and 2 × 10^{10} ohm-cm
High	above 2 × 10^{10} ohm-cm

=== Dust layer resistance ===
Resistance affects electrical conditions in the dust layer by a potential electric field (voltage drop) being formed across the layer as negatively charged particles arrive at its surface and leak their electrical charges to the collection plate. At the metal surface of the electrically grounded collection plate, the voltage is zero, whereas at the outer surface of the dust layer, where new particles and ions are arriving, the electrostatic voltage caused by the gas ions can be quite high. The strength of this electric field depends on the resistance and thickness of the dust layer.

In high-resistance dust layers, the dust is not sufficiently conductive, so electrical charges have difficulty moving through the dust layer. Consequently, electrical charges accumulate on and beneath the dust layer surface, creating a strong electric field.

Voltages can be greater than 10,000 volts. Dust particles with high resistance are held too strongly to the plate, making them difficult to remove and causing trapping problems.

In low resistance dust layers, the corona current is readily passed to the grounded collection electrode. Therefore, a relatively weak electric field, of several thousand volts, is maintained across the dust layer. Collected dust particles with low resistance do not adhere strongly enough to the collection plate. They are easily dislodged and become retained in the gas stream.

The electrical conductivity of a bulk layer of particles depends on both surface and volume factors. Volume conduction, or the motions of electrical charges through the interiors of particles, depends mainly on the composition and temperature of the particles. In the higher temperature regions, above 500 °F (260 °C), volume conduction controls the conduction mechanism. Volume conduction also involves ancillary factors, such as compression of the particle layer, particle size and shape, and surface properties.

Volume conduction is represented in the figures as a straight-line at temperatures above 500 °F (260 °C). At temperatures below about 450 °F (230 °C), electrical charges begin to flow across surface moisture and chemical films adsorbed onto the particles. Surface conduction begins to lower the resistivity values and bend the curve downward at temperatures below 500 °F (260 °C).

These films usually differ both physically and chemically from the interiors of the particles owing to adsorption phenomena. Theoretical calculations indicate that moisture films only a few molecules thick are adequate to provide the desired surface conductivity. Surface conduction on particles is closely related to surface-leakage currents occurring on electrical insulators, which have been extensively studied. An interesting practical application of surface-leakage is the determination of dew point by measurement of the current between adjacent electrodes mounted on a glass surface. A sharp rise in current signals the formation of a moisture film on the glass. This method has been used effectively for determining the marked rise in dew point, which occurs when small amounts of sulfuric acid vapor are added to an atmosphere (commercial Dewpoint Meters are available on the market).

The following discussion of normal, high, and low resistance applies to ESPs operated in a dry state; resistance is not a problem in the operation of wet ESPs because of the moisture concentration in the ESP. The relationship between moisture content and resistance is explained later in this work.

=== Normal resistivity ===
As stated above, ESPs work best under normal resistivity conditions. Particles with normal resistivity do not rapidly lose their charge on arrival at the collection electrode. These particles slowly leak their charge to grounded plates and are retained on the collection plates by intermolecular adhesive and cohesive forces. This allows a particulate layer to be built up and then dislodged from the plates by rapping. Within the range of normal dust resistivity (between 10^{7} and 2 × 10^{10} ohm-cm), fly ash is collected more easily than dust having either low or high resistivity.

=== High resistivity ===
If the voltage drop across the dust layer becomes too high, several adverse effects can occur. First, the high voltage drop reduces the voltage difference between the discharge electrode and collection electrode, and thereby reduces the electrostatic field strength used to drive the gas ion-charged particles over to the collected dust layer. As the dust layer builds up, and the electrical charges accumulate on the surface of the dust layer, the voltage difference between the discharge and collection electrodes decreases. The migration velocities of small particles are especially affected by the reduced electric field strength.

Another problem that occurs with high resistivity dust layers is called back corona. This occurs when the potential drop across the dust layer is so great that corona discharges begin to appear in the gas that is trapped within the dust layer. The dust layer breaks down electrically, producing small holes or craters from which back corona discharges occur. Positive gas ions are generated within the dust layer and are accelerated toward the "negatively charged" discharge electrode. The positive ions reduce some of the negative charges on the dust layer and neutralize some of the negative ions on the "charged particles" heading toward the collection electrode. Disruptions of the normal corona process greatly reduce the ESP's collection efficiency, which in severe cases, may fall below 50% . When back corona is present, the dust particles build up on the electrodes forming a layer of insulation. Often this can not be repaired without bringing the unit offline.

The third, and generally most common problem with high resistivity dust is increased electrical sparking. When the sparking rate exceeds the "set spark rate limit," the automatic controllers limit the operating voltage of the field. This causes reduced particle charging and reduced migration velocities toward the collection electrode. High resistivity can generally be reduced by doing the following:

- Adjusting the temperature;
- Increasing moisture content;
- Adding conditioning agents to the gas stream;
- Increasing the collection surface area; and
- Using hot-side precipitators (occasionally and with foreknowledge of sodium depletion).

Thin dust layers and high-resistivity dust especially favor the formation of back corona craters. Severe back corona has been observed with dust layers as thin as 0.1 mm, but a dust layer just over one particle thick can reduce the sparking voltage by 50%. The most marked effects of back corona on the current-voltage characteristics are:

1. Reduction of the spark over voltage by as much as 50% or more;
2. Current jumps or discontinuities caused by the formation of stable back-corona craters; and
3. Large increase in maximum corona current, which just below spark over corona gap may be several times the normal current.

The Figure below and to the left shows the variation in resistivity with changing gas temperature for six different industrial dusts along with three coal-fired fly ashes. The Figure on the right illustrates resistivity values measured for various chemical compounds that were prepared in the laboratory.

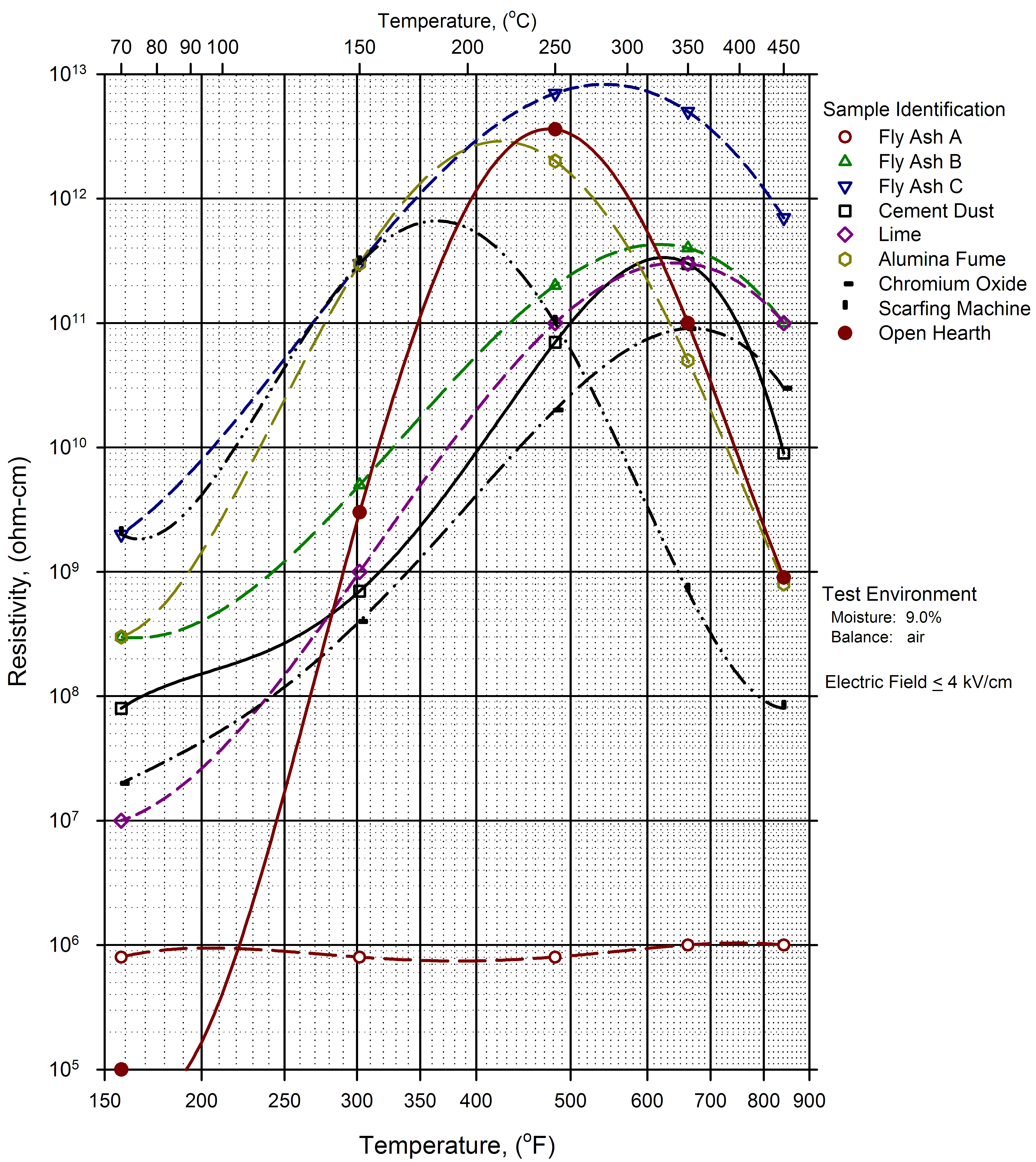
Resistivity Values of Representative Dusts and Fumes From Industrial Plants

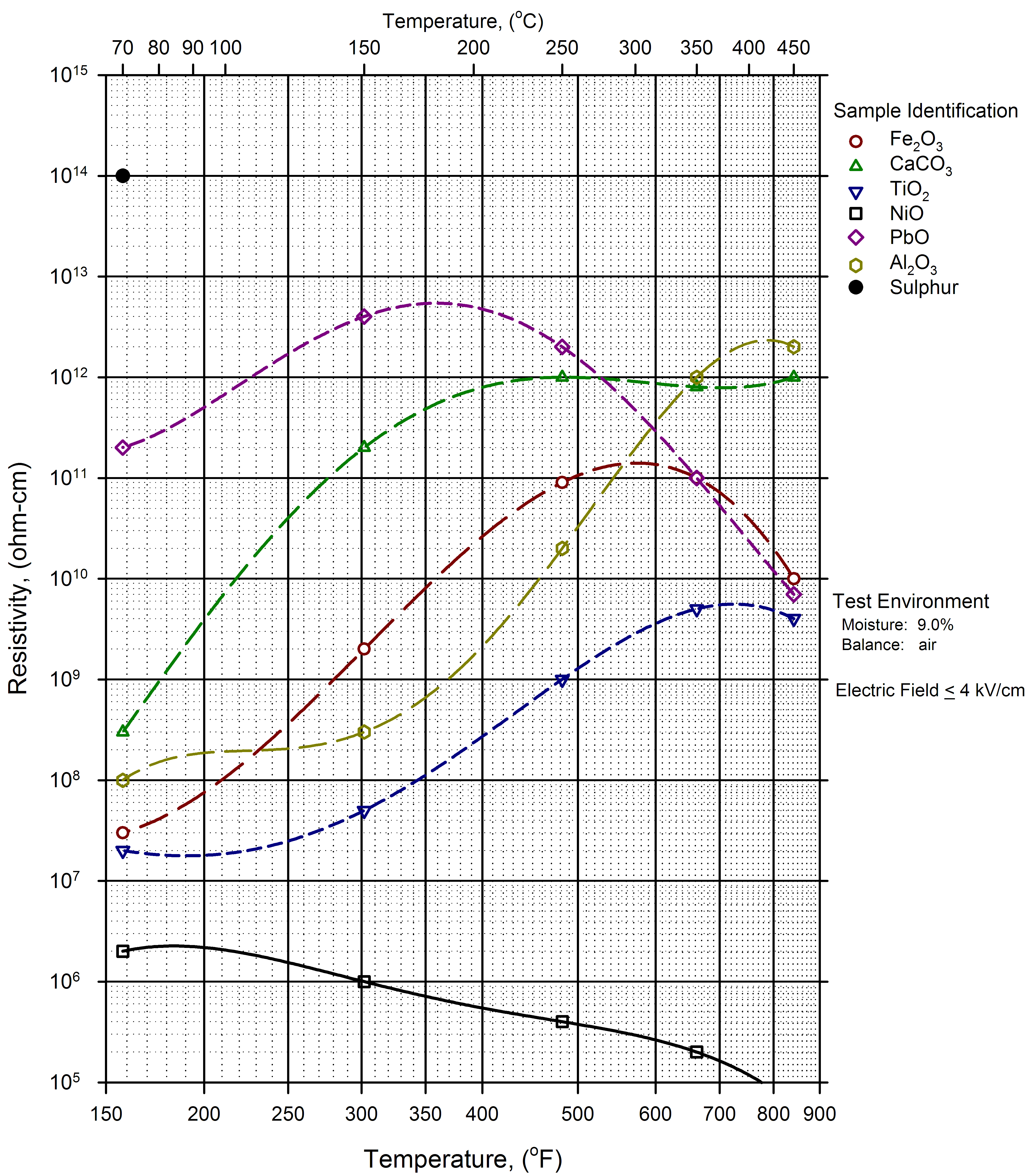
Resistivity Values of Various Chemicals and Reagents as a Function of Temperature

Results for Fly Ash A (in the figure to the left) were acquired in the ascending temperature mode. These data are typical for a moderate to high combustibles content ash. Data for Fly Ash B are from the same sample, acquired during the descending temperature mode.

The differences between the ascending and descending temperature modes are due to the presence of unburned combustibles in the sample. Between the two test modes, the samples are equilibrated in dry air for 14 hours (overnight) at 850 °F (450 °C). This overnight annealing process typically removes between 60% and 90% of any unburned combustibles present in the samples. Exactly how carbon works as a charge carrier is not fully understood, but it is known to significantly reduce the resistivity of a dust.

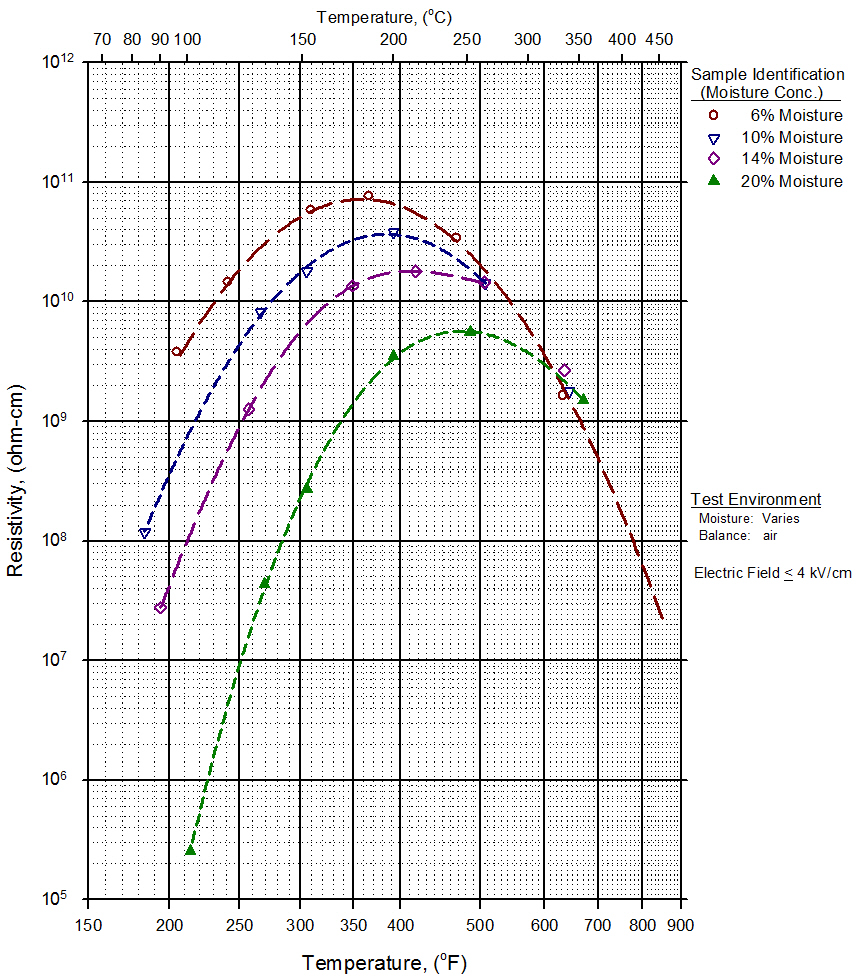
Resistivity Measured as a Function of Temperature in Varying Moisture Concentrations (Humidity)

Carbon can act, at first, like a high resistivity dust in the precipitator. Higher voltages can be required in order for corona generation to begin. These higher voltages can be problematic for the TR-Set controls. The problem lies in onset of corona causing large amounts of current to surge through the (low resistivity) dust layer. The controls sense this surge as a spark. As precipitators are operated in spark-limiting mode, power is terminated and the corona generation cycle re-initiates. Thus, lower power (current) readings are noted with relatively high voltage readings.

The same thing is believed to occur in laboratory measurements. Parallel plate geometry is used in laboratory measurements without corona generation. A stainless steel cup holds the sample. Another stainless steel electrode weight sits on top of the sample (direct contact with the dust layer). As voltage is increased from small amounts (e.g. 20 V), no current is measured. Then, a threshold voltage level is reached. At this level, current surges through the sample... so much so that the voltage supply unit can trip off. After removal of the unburned combustibles during the above-mentioned annealing procedure, the descending temperature mode curve shows the typical inverted “V” shape one might expect.

=== Low resistivity ===
Particles that have low resistivity are difficult to collect because they are easily charged (very conductive) and rapidly lose their charge on arrival at the collection electrode. The particles take on the charge of the collection electrode, bounce off the plates, and become re-entrained in the gas stream. Thus, attractive and repulsive electrical forces that are normally at work at normal and higher resistivities are lacking, and the binding forces to the plate are considerably lessened. Examples of low-resistivity dusts are unburned carbon in fly ash and carbon black.

If these conductive particles are coarse, they can be removed upstream of the precipitator by using a device such as a cyclone mechanical collector.

The addition of liquid ammonia (NH_{3}) into the gas stream as a conditioning agent has found wide use in recent years. It is theorized that ammonia reacts with H_{2}SO_{4} contained in the flue gas to form an ammonium sulfate compound that increases the cohesivity of the dust. This additional cohesivity makes up for the loss of electrical attraction forces.

The table below summarizes the characteristics associated with low, normal and high resistivity dusts.

The moisture content of the flue gas stream also affects particle resistivity. Increasing the moisture content of the gas stream by spraying water or injecting steam into the duct work preceding the ESP lowers the resistivity. In both temperature adjustment and moisture conditioning, one must maintain gas conditions above the dew point to prevent corrosion problems in the ESP or downstream equipment. The figure to the right shows the effect of temperature and moisture on the resistivity of a cement dust. As the percentage of moisture in the gas stream increases from 6 to 20%, the resistivity of the dust dramatically decreases. Also, raising or lowering the temperature can decrease cement dust resistivity for all the moisture percentages represented.

The presence of SO_{3} in the gas stream has been shown to favor the electrostatic precipitation process when problems with high resistivity occur. Most of the sulfur content in the coal burned for combustion sources converts to SO_{2}. However, approximately 1% of the sulfur converts to SO_{3}. The amount of SO_{3} in the flue gas normally increases with increasing sulfur content of the coal. The resistivity of the particles decreases as the sulfur content of the coal increases.

Resistivity	Range of measurement	Precipitator characteristics
Low	between 10^{4} and 10^{7} ohm-cm	1. Normal operating voltage and current levels unless dust layer is thick enough to reduce plate clearances and cause higher current levels.; 2. Reduced electrical force component retaining collected dust, vulnerable to high reentrainment losses.; 3. Negligible voltage drop across dust layer.; 4. Reduced collection performance due to (2)
Normal	between 10^{7} and 2 × 10^{10} ohm-cm	1. Normal operating voltage and current levels.; 2. Negligible voltage drop across dust layer.; 3. Sufficient electrical force component retaining collected dust.; 4. High collection performance due to (1), (2) and (3)
Marginal to high	between 2 × 10^{10} and 10^{12} ohm-cm	1. Reduced operating voltage and current levels with high spark rates.; 2. Significant voltage loss across dust layer.; 3. Moderate electrical force component retaining collected dust.; 4. Reduced collection performance due to (1) and (2)
High	above 10^{12} ohm-cm	1. Reduced operating voltage levels; high operating current levels if power supply controller is not operating properly.; 2. Very significant voltage loss across dust layer.; 3. High electrical force component retaining collected dust.; 4. Seriously reduced collection performance due to (1), (2) and probably back corona.

Other conditioning agents, such as sulfuric acid, ammonia, sodium chloride, and soda ash (sometimes as raw trona), have also been used to reduce particle resistivity. Therefore, the chemical composition of the flue gas stream is important with regard to the resistivity of the particles to be collected in the ESP. The table below lists various conditioning agents and their mechanisms of operation.

Conditioning agent	Mechanism(s) of action
Sulfur trioxide and/or sulfuric acid	1. Condensation and adsorption on fly ash surfaces.; 2. May also increase cohesiveness of fly ash.; 3. Reduces resistivity.
Ammonia	Mechanism is not clear, various ones proposed; 1. Modifies resistivity.; 2. Increases ash cohesiveness.; 3. Enhances space charge effect.
Ammonium sulfate	Little is known about the mechanism; claims are made for the following: 1. Modifies resistivity (depends upon injection temperature).; 2. Increases ash cohesiveness.; 3. Enhances space charge effect.; 4. Experimental data lacking to substantiate which of these is predominant.
Triethylamine	Particle agglomeration claimed; no supporting data.
Sodium compounds	1. Natural conditioner if added with coal.; 2. Resistivity modifier if injected into gas stream.
Compounds of transition metals	Postulated that they catalyze oxidation of SO_{2} to SO_{3}; no definitive tests with fly ash to verify this postulation.
Potassium sulfate and sodium chloride	In cement and lime kiln ESPs: 1. Resistivity modifiers in the gas stream.; 2. NaCl - natural conditioner when mixed with coal.

If injection of ammonium sulfate occurs at a temperature greater than about 600 °F (320 °C), dissociation into ammonia and sulfur trioxide results. Depending on the ash, SO_{2} may preferentially interact with fly ash as SO_{3} conditioning. The remainder recombines with ammonia to add to the space charge as well as increase cohesiveness of the ash.

More recently, it has been recognized that a major reason for loss of efficiency of the electrostatic precipitator is due to particle buildup on the charging wires in addition to the collection plates (Davidson and McKinney, 1998). This is easily remedied by making sure that the wires themselves are cleaned at the same time that the collecting plates are cleaned.

Sulfuric acid vapor (SO_{3}) enhances the effects of water vapor on surface conduction. It is physically adsorbed within the layer of moisture on the particle surfaces. The effects of relatively small amounts of acid vapor can be seen in the figure below and to the right.

The inherent resistivity of the sample at 300 °F (150 °C) is 5 × 10^{12} ohm-cm. An equilibrium concentration of just 1.9 ppm sulfuric acid vapor lowers that value to about 7 × 10^{9} ohm-cm.

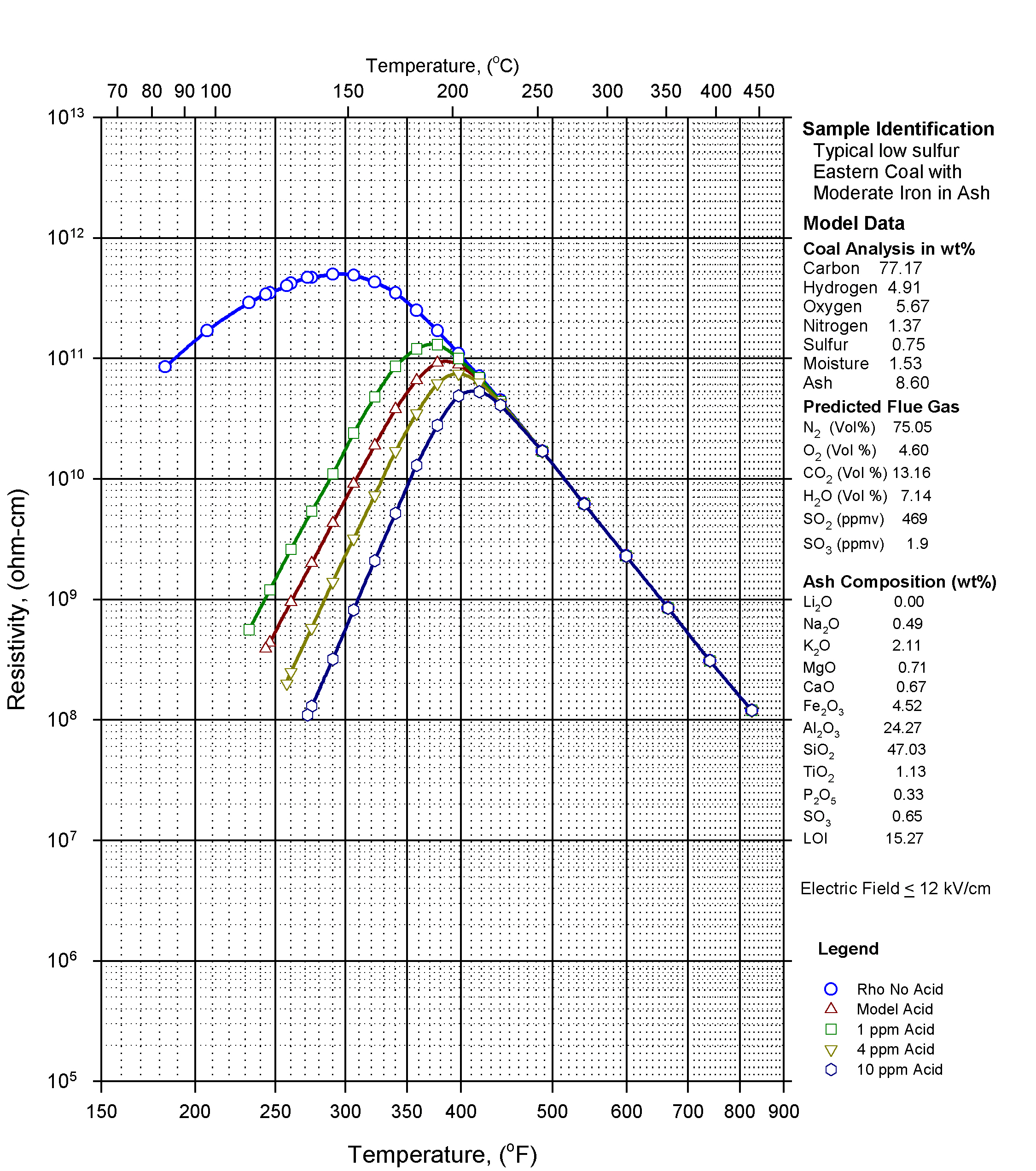
Resistivity Modeled As A Function of Environmental Conditions - Especially Sulfuric Acid Vapor

== Modern industrial electrostatic precipitators ==
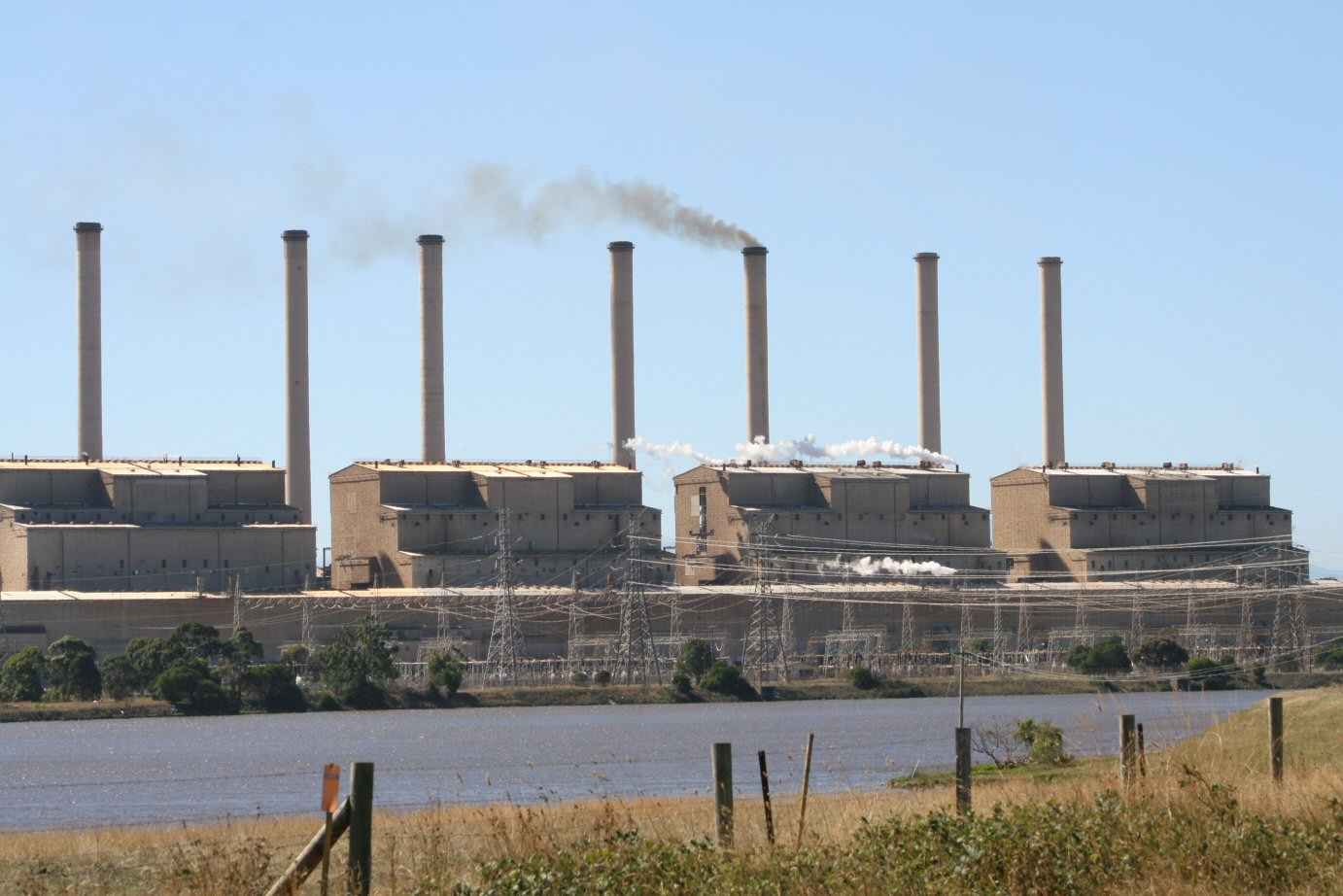
A smokestack at coal-fired Hazelwood Power Station in Victoria, Australia emits brown smoke when its ESP is shut down

ESPs continue to be excellent devices for control of many industrial particulate emissions, including smoke from electricity-generating utilities (coal and oil fired), salt cake collection from black liquor boilers in pulp mills, and catalyst collection from fluidized bed catalytic cracker units in oil refineries to name a few. These devices treat gas volumes from several hundred thousand ACFM to 2.5 million ACFM (1,180 m³/s) in the largest coal-fired boiler applications. For a coal-fired boiler the collection is usually performed downstream of the air preheater at about 160 °C (320 °F) which provides optimal resistivity of the coal-ash particles. For some difficult applications with low-sulfur fuel hot-end units have been built operating above 370 °C (698 °F).

The original parallel plate–weighted wire design (see figure of Plate and Bar precipitator above) has evolved as more efficient (and robust) discharge electrode designs were developed, today focusing on rigid (pipe-frame) discharge electrodes to which many sharpened spikes are attached (barbed wire), maximizing corona production. Transformer-rectifier systems apply voltages of 50–100 kV at relatively high current densities. Modern controls, such as an automatic voltage control, minimize electric sparking and prevent arcing (sparks are quenched within 1/2 cycle of the TR set), avoiding damage to the components. Automatic plate-rapping systems and hopper-evacuation systems remove the collected particulate matter while on line, theoretically allowing ESPs to stay in continuous operation for years at a time.

== Electrostatic sampling for bioaerosols ==
Electrostatic precipitators can be used to sample biological airborne particles or aerosol for analysis. Sampling for bioaerosols requires precipitator designs optimised with a liquid counter electrode, which can be used to sample biological particles, e.g. viruses, directly into a small liquid volume to reduce unnecessary sample dilution. See Bioaerosols for more details.

== Wet electrostatic precipitator ==
A wet electrostatic precipitator (WESP or wet ESP) operates with water vapor saturated air streams (100% relative humidity). WESPs are commonly used to remove liquid droplets such as sulfuric acid mist from industrial process gas streams. The WESP is also commonly used where the gases are high in moisture content, contain combustible particulate, or have particles that are sticky in nature.

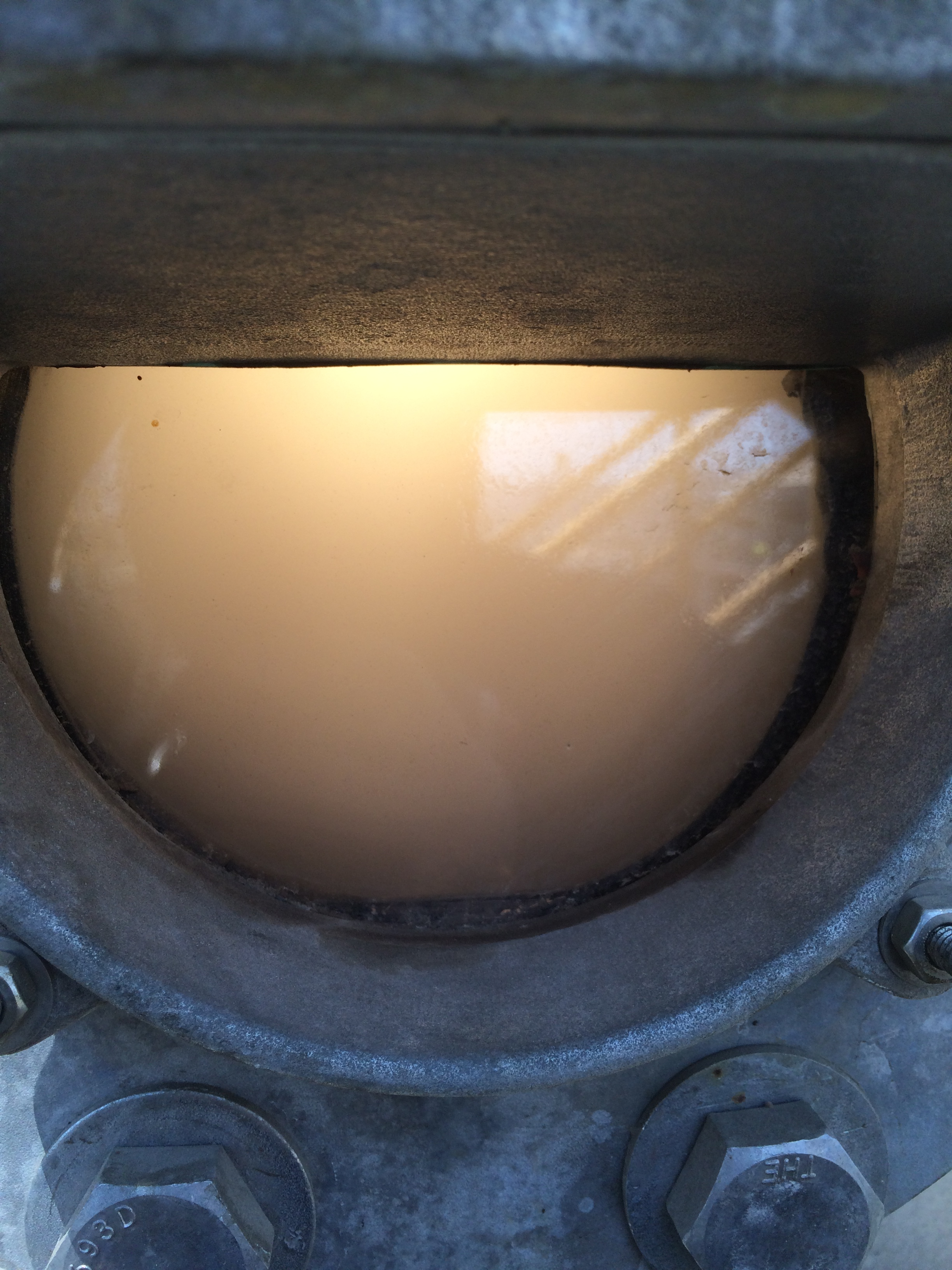
Example of "dirty" process gas with 100% opacity entering a WESP in a metallurgical sulfuric acid plant. A backlight is used to illuminate the process gas.

== Household electrostatic air cleaners ==
Plate precipitators are commonly marketed to the public as air purifier devices or as a permanent replacement for furnace filters, but all have the undesirable attribute of being somewhat messy to clean. A negative side-effect of electrostatic precipitation devices is the potential production of toxic ozone and NO_{x}. However, electrostatic precipitators offer benefits over other air purifications technologies, such as HEPA filtration, which require expensive filters and can become "production sinks" for many harmful forms of bacteria.

With electrostatic precipitators, if the collection plates are allowed to accumulate large amounts of particulate matter, the particles can sometimes bond so tightly to the metal plates that vigorous washing and scrubbing may be required to completely clean the collection plates. The close spacing of the plates can make thorough cleaning difficult, and the stack of plates often cannot be easily disassembled for cleaning. One solution, suggested by several manufacturers, is to wash the collector plates in a dishwasher.

Some consumer precipitation filters are sold with special soak-off cleaners, where the entire plate array is removed from the precipitator and soaked in a large container overnight, to help loosen the tightly bonded particulates.

A study by the Canada Mortgage and Housing Corporation testing a variety of forced-air furnace filters found that ESP filters provided the best, and most cost-effective means of cleaning air using a forced-air system.

The first portable electrostatic air filter systems for homes was marketed in 1954 by Raytheon.

== See also ==
- Air ionizer
- Air purge system
- Ozone generator
- Scrubber
