= Rohr, Inc. =

Defunct aerospace manufacturing company based in Chula Vista, California

- Formerly: Rohr Aircraft Corporation; Rohr Industries
- Type: Subsidiary
- Traded as: NYSE: RHR (delisted 1997)
- Industry: Aerospace
- Founded: August 6, 1940
- Founder: Frederick H. Rohr
- Headquarters: Chula Vista, California, United States
- Owners: Goodrich Corporation (1997–2012); United Technologies (2012–2020); Raytheon Technologies (2020–present)

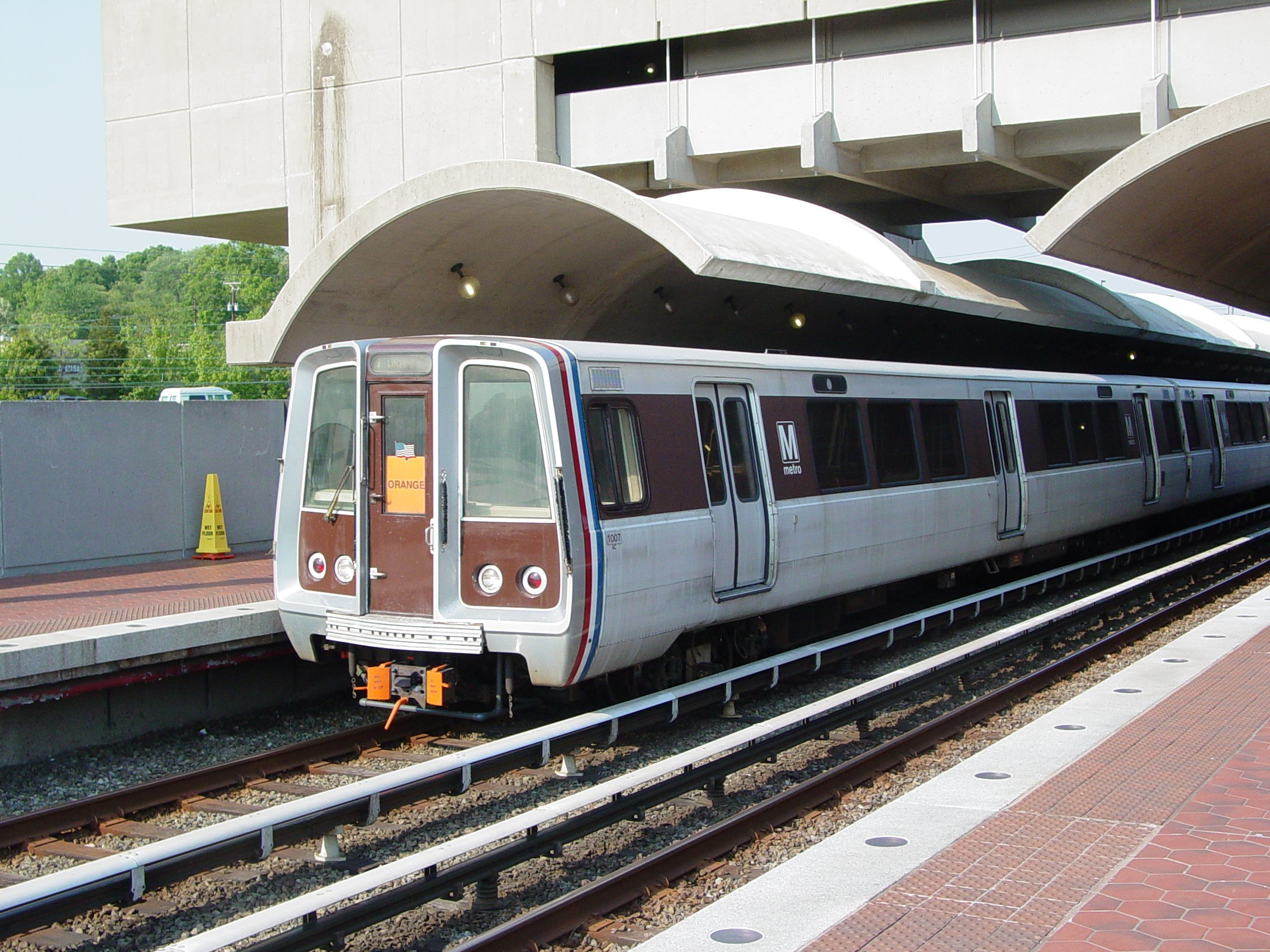
Rohr subway cars manufactured for the Washington Metro

Rohr, Inc. is an aerospace manufacturing company based in Chula Vista, California, south of San Diego. It is a wholly owned unit of the Collins Aerospace division of RTX Corporation; it was founded in 1940 by Frederick H. Rohr as Rohr Aircraft.

Rohr's main product line are aerostructures, such as engine-related components, including engine nacelles, thrust reversers, and mounting pylons for military and commercial aircraft. The company also consults on integrating and managing its designs with the other aircraft systems.

Other products include auxiliary power units, flight control surfaces, cruise missile, rocket and warhead design (~1971-1981), and other aircraft parts.

== History ==
=== Founding years ===
Frederick H. Rohr, creator of the fuel tanks for Charles Lindbergh's Spirit of St. Louis, founded Rohr Aircraft Corporation on August 6, 1940 with the help of Reuben H. Fleet after approaching him for a job. The company incorporated as Rohr Corporation in 1969, and changed its name to Rohr Industries, Inc. in 1971.

=== Equipment manufacturing (1960s-70s) ===
In the 1960s and 1970s, Rohr Industries made a foray into mass transit equipment manufacturing. It manufactured railcars for Bay Area Rapid Transit (BART) in the San Francisco Bay Area, and the first 300 subway cars for the Washington Metro, among others. It was also the United States license holder of the Aérotrain. In 1970 it produced an experimental Aérotrain design, the TACV, and purchased the rights to the Monocab design and turned it into the ROMAG. In the same year it acquired the Flxible Company, a bus manufacturer, which would produce a Transbus design, which evolved into the Model 870 Advanced Design Bus, as well as the later Flxible Metro, which addressed all of the shortcomings of the Model 870. Rohr divested itself of, or discontinued those programs by the late 1970s.

=== Rebrand and Goodrich Corporation merger (1990s) ===
Rohr Industries became Rohr, Inc. in 1992. It was listed on the New York Stock Exchange under the ticker symbol RHR, until it merged with the Goodrich Corporation in 1997 and remained a separately incorporated company as Goodrich Aerostructures.

=== Goodrich sale (2012-present) ===
In August 2012, United Technologies Corporation (UTC) purchased Goodrich Corporation and all its divisions. After the acquisition, UTC created an aerospace systems division, United Technologies Aerospace Systems (UTAS), into which all divisions of Goodrich Corporation and UTC's Hamilton Sundstrand divisions were incorporated as one entity. On 26 November 2018, United Technologies announced the completion of its Rockwell Collins acquisition, after which it merged its newly acquired business with UTC Aerospace Systems to form Collins Aerospace.

UTC merged with the Raytheon Company in a $135 billion deal in April 2020 to form Raytheon Technologies. Rohr is a wholly owned unit of the Collins Aerospace division of Raytheon Technologies.

== Sales and divestitures ==
UTC sold its UTC Power unit in early 2013 to Oregon-based ClearEdge Power. UTC sold the former Goodrich electric power systems to Safran for $400 million. This was a divestiture that was a condition of UTC's 2012 acquisition of Goodrich. Pratt & Whitney's Rocketdyne operations were sold to jet engine maker GenCorp for $550 million in mid-2013. Three former Hamilton Sundstrand businesses, Milton Roy, Sullair and Sundyne, were sold to private equity firms BC Partners and The Carlyle Group for $3.46 billion.

== Bibliography ==
- Rohr, Inc. 10-K for July 31, 1997
