= GTUIT =

American gas company

- Type: Private
- Industry: Oilfield Services
- Founded: 2011; 15 years ago
- Headquarters: Billings, Montana, United States
- Key people: Brian Cebull CEO, President and Co-founder; Jim Haider CTO and Co-founder; Mark Peterson COO and Co-founder
- Website: gtuit.com

GTUIT is a well site gas processing firm. The company's mobile equipment collects gas that would otherwise be flared and turns it into usable natural gas liquid and conditioned gas. In 2015, the company received an equity investment from Caterpillar Inc.'s Oil and Gas division and signed a marketing deal with the company in 2016. The company is headquartered in Billings, Montana and has a field office in Watford City, North Dakota.

== History ==
GTUIT was founded in August 2011 by the mechanical engineers, Brian Cebull and Jim Haider, and the chemical engineer, Mark Peterson after the three recognized the problems that flaring gas could cause. The company launched its first prototype, a device that separated and stored gases in 2012. GTUIT deployed its second generation of equipment in 2013. The company's first customer was Denbury Resources.

In April 2015, Caterpillar Oil and Gas made an equity investment in GTUIT, the funds raised by the investment allowed the company to expand manufacturing and seek new markets. That same year the company received ISO 9001:2008 certification for its manufacturing quality management systems, the company also received an award from the World Bank Global Gas Flaring Reduction Partnership for its work with Hess Corporation in the Bakken region.

In June 2016, the company signed a marketing agreement with Caterpillar Oil and Gas, the agreement allowed Caterpillar to sell and service GTUIT products.

In September 2016, the company was ranked 203 on Inc.'s list of 500 fastest growing companies in the US.

== Operations ==
GTUIT designs, markets and operates mobile well site gas processing equipment that can be set up in a day. There are three processing capacities for the systems, 250 MSCFD, 500 MSCFD and 1000 MSCFD. The systems are designed to capture gas that would otherwise be flared and remove and store valuable and harmful gasses from escaping into the atmosphere. The company uses a compression and refrigeration system that connects directly to the wellhead and can capture up to 3,856 tons of volatile organic compound emissions. The collected natural gas liquids can then be trucked to markets and sold or depending on the gas can be used as on-site fuel.
