= Frederick H. Rohr =

American entrepreneur (1896–1965)

Frederick Hilmer Rohr
- Born: 10 May 1896; Hoboken, New Jersey
- Died: 8 November 1965 (aged 69)
- Occupations: Founder, CEO, President of Rohr Aircraft Corporation
- Spouse: Shirley Rohr
- Honours: International Air & Space Hall of Fame Inductee

Frederick Hilmer Rohr (10 May 1896 – 8 November 1965) was a German-American entrepreneur and engineer who founded Rohr Aircraft, the world's leading manufacturer of aerostructures in the mid-20th century. Rohr pioneered new methods of aircraft production, including the use of drop hammers, stainless steel honeycomb construction, and overpressed forming processes which radically increased the aviation industry's overall output, critical to the Allied war effort in the Second World War. Moreover, Rohr's company was the first to sell combined engine and casing packages to major airplane manufacturers like Convair or Lockheed, which previously constructed the components in-house. Headquartered in Chula Vista, Rohr was principally responsible for the city's growth during the 20th century.

== Biography ==
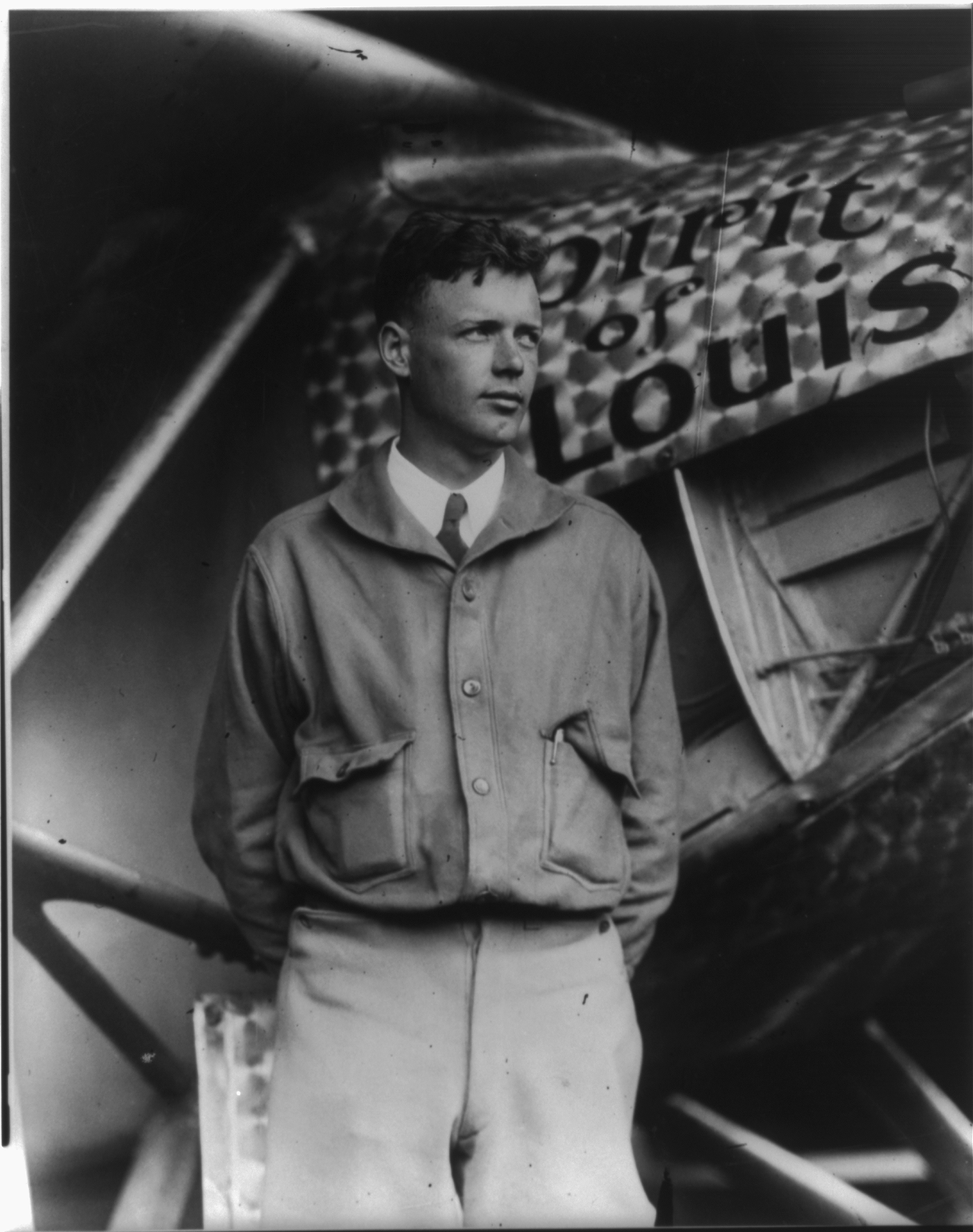
Charles Lindbergh before the Spirit of St. Louis, which Rohr worked on with a team that became known as the Night Hawks

Frederick Hilmer Rohr was born on 10 May 1896 in Hoboken, New Jersey, where his father, Henry Gustav Rohr, had recently arrived from Germany. Looking to market his skills in working with sheet metal, Henry Rohr migrated westward with his family in 1898 and founded a metalworking shop in San Francisco. Frederick Rohr grew up working in his father's shop, learning the trade while pursuing an independent engineering education through night school and correspondence courses. After serving with the U.S. Navy in the First World War, Rohr spent a few years toying with aircraft in Fresno before moving to San Diego in 1924 to open the Standard Sheet Metal Works. Within a year he was hired as sheet metal foreman by the Ryan Aeronautical Company, which, after its acquisition by Frank Mahoney in 1926, was commissioned by Charles Lindbergh to build the 'Spirit of St. Louis' for his seminal transatlantic flight. Rohr not only handled all of the aircraft's sheet metal components, but engineered the specially strengthened fuel tanks required to sustain the plane's 33 ^{1}/_{2} hr flight through turbulent skies.

In 1928, after Mahoney sold Ryan Aeronautical, Rohr became Factory Manager for the Solar Aircraft Company, where he replaced the time-consuming process of manually hammering metal sheets into desired shapes with mechanized drop hammers. This innovation, allowing workers to simply place the metal beneath a falling piston-powered cylinder, so impressed aircraft producers that Rohr was invited to introduce the machines at Boeing Airplane Company's Seattle plant, where he became a consulting engineer in 1933. He returned to San Diego two years later to take a position as Factory Manager for Ryan Aeronautical. All the while Rohr had designs upon a company of his own, inspired by his enduring faith in the future of flight. He envisioned a new type of aviation manufacturer that built neither planes nor engines, but made prefabricated aircraft components (aerostructures) for use by major airplane producers. Finally, in 1940, after months of careful consideration and planning, Rohr and four companions signed the Articles of Incorporation for the new Rohr Aircraft Corporation.

With promised contracts from two major corporations and a host of poached employees from Ryan Aeronautical, Rohr wasted no time waiting for the negotiations over his planned factory plot in Chula Vista to finish; operations began downtown in a dilapidated three-story building. By October 1940 Rohr employed 64 people working on 3 significant contracts, one of which the British government had commissioned. Though the United States had not yet directly intervened in the ongoing Second World War, the government's arms agreements with Allied powers called for the sale of large quantities of military aircraft, a source of demand which ensured steady work for the nascent company. When the American government began its own military buildup, however, Rohr Aircraft Corporation underwent rapid and enormous expansion, ascending to become the largest supplier in its field. After 7 December 1941, Rohr Aircraft also took on its role as a vital part of the American war effort. The pre-constructed power plant assemblies and other aerostructures Rohr sold to airplane manufacturers increased the country's rate of plane production, as aircraft manufacturers could install such components in minutes rather than days. One year in operation had seen Rohr's new company generate $1,493,488 in revenue and hire 800 new employees.

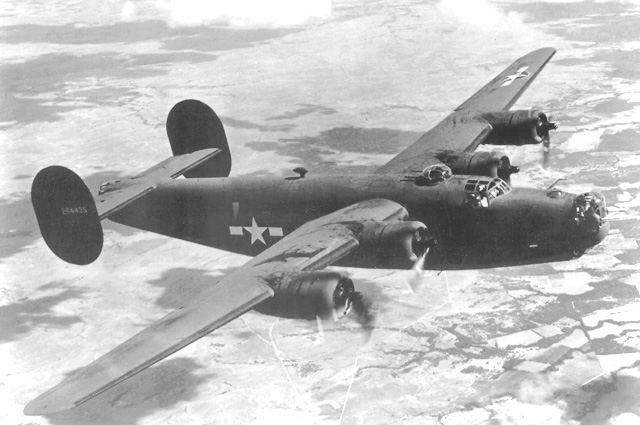
The B-24 Liberator, for which Rohr provided the power package (engine and nacelle) in huge numbers during World War II

Rohr relocated to the new factory grounds in 1941, but soon had to expand further and purchased new tracts. The exodus of male workers to serve in the Second World War and the company's drastic need for labor resulted in the hiring of many women, first as office staff but soon also as workers on the factory floor. Rohr manufactured power plant assemblies for Consolidated Aircraft's B-24 and PB2Y-3, nacelles for the PBY and Lockheed Hudson, and doors for the nose and landing wheels of Lockheed's P-38 fighter. Unbridled expansion continued, catapulting Rohr Aircraft to nearly 10,000 employees, but even before the war's end contracts began to slow. The Allied victory and the Truman administration's subsequent cutback on military spending blindsided the swollen company, and it burst. The high of 96,270 aircraft produced in America in 1944 fell to only 1,400 in 1946, and Rohr's workforce collapsed to 675, a decline of 93.25%. Scrambling to remain solvent, Rohr merged the Rohr Aircraft Corporation with the International Detrola Company, and his titanic industrial factories were turned from manufacturing aircraft components to making vacuum cleaners, washing machines, and toy boats. In 1949, however, after reviving a business relationship with Boeing and assisting major aircraft corporations in manufacturing techniques, Rohr bought back his company with advance payments made in good faith by Boeing executives.

The rise of commercial aircraft and the escalation of the Cold War, especially through the Korean War, fueled Rohr Aircraft's resurgence in the 1950s, allowing for the establishment of three new manufacturing sites in Riverside, CA, Winder, GA, and Auburn, WA. Meanwhile, the workforce similarly grew, and by the end of the decade had almost completely recouped the postwar losses. However, labor relations proved a continual source of conflict, as the board of directors struggled fiercely in negotiations with the International Association of Machinists, the union which represented most Rohr employees. A strike at the Riverside plant in 1955 lasted six weeks before company officials, aided by a federal mediator, conceded the contract dispute allowing third-party arbitration of future issues. In 1960 a strike was threatened against the Riverside and Chula Vista plants, but avoided by the signing of a new contract. A 1962 labor conflict caused three employees to go on a hunger strike for seven days to protest Rohr's dilatory behavior in settling the union's contract.

Employees were not the only source of discontent, however, and in 1954 Rohr's company faced severe criticism from the Citizens' League for Better Government, a newly founded Chula Vista political organization that charged Rohr with infiltrating local government in an effort to ultimately lower taxes and land lease prices. Rohr had encouraged his employees to become involved in the community and sponsored numerous donations to various charitable organizations in the area, as well as paying more than a quarter of the city's total tax revenue. Rohr employees served at all levels of the Chula Vista government, on many citizen's committees, and on school boards. Due principally to Rohr's presence, Chula Vista grew from a farming municipality of 4,000 inhabitants to a city of nearly 30,000 between 1940 and 1955. In a special election on 18 November 1954 called by the founder of the Citizens' League, a former Rohr contractor who made a failed bid for city council, three Rohr employees on the city council were unseated. The next day, Rohr issued his response, defending the company's involvement in the community and its intentions. On 25 November, all Rohr employees involved in the civil service resigned from their government positions. The Chula Vista community immediately capitulated; business owners and community leaders took out a full-page signature ad in the Chula Vista Star articulating their appreciation of the company's contribution to the city, a framed copy of which was presented to Rohr. A few weeks later, to demonstrate Rohr Aircraft's impact on Chula Vista, the workers were paid their weekly wages in silver coins from the San Francisco factory mint, which filtered through the city's homes and businesses for over a week.

Frederick H. Rohr died of a stroke at the age of 69 on 8 November 1965.

== Legacy ==
While the man and the company he started are gone, the legacy of Fred Rohr and Rohr, Inc. continues. The growth of Chula Vista was helped by the company, and the products it made contributed to the success of the aircraft industry from World War II into the jet age. The company provided good paying jobs for thousands of residents of Chula Vista and helped the community. Fred Rohr's contributions are recognized at Rohr Manor, Rohr Park and Rohr Elementary School, which were all named after him.

The Chula Vista Heritage Museum hosted an exhibit showcasing Rohr's impacts on the region in 2017.

== Sources ==
- Mingos, Howard, editor. The Aircraft Year Book for 1943. 25th ed., Aeronautical Chamber of Commerce of America, 1943.
- Austin, Edward T. Rohr: The Story of a Corporation. Rohr Corporation, 1969.
- Dean, Ada. "Fred H. Rohr: A Man and His Corporation." City of Chula Vista, Chula Vista Heritage Museum, 2017, http://www.chulavistaca.gov/home/showdocument?id=2.
- Scott, Mary L. San Diego, Air Capital of the West. The San Diego Air and Space Museum, 2005.
- Sprekelmeyer, Linda, editor. These We Honor: The International Aerospace Hall of Fame. Donning Co. Publishers, 2006. ISBN 978-1-57864-397-4.
