= Actual cubic feet per minute =

Imperial unit of volumetric flow rate

Actual cubic feet per minute (ACFM) is a unit of volumetric flow. It is commonly used by manufacturers of blowers and compressors. This is the actual gas delivery with reference to inlet conditions, whereas cubic foot per minute (CFM) is an unqualified term and should only be used in general and never accepted as a specific definition without explanation. Since the volumetric capacity refers to the volume of air or other gas at the inlet to the unit, it is often referred to as "inlet cubic feet per minute" (ICFM).

Actual cubic feet per minute is the volume of gas and air flowing anywhere in a system independent of its density. If the system were moving air at exactly the "standard" condition, then ACFM would equal Standard cubic feet per minute (SCFM). However, this usually is not the case as the most important change between these two definitions is the pressure. To move air, either a positive pressure or a vacuum must be created. When positive pressure is applied to a standard cubic foot of air or other gas, it gets smaller. When a vacuum is applied to a standard cubic foot of gas, it expands. The volume of gas after it is pressurized or rarefied is referred to as its "actual" volume.

The term cubic feet per minute (CFM) is ambiguous when it comes to the mass of gas that passes through a certain point because gas is compressible. If the pressure is doubled, then, for an ideal gas, the mass of the gas that passes by will also be double for the same rate of flow in cubic feet per minute. For instance, a centrifugal fan is a constant CFM device or a constant volume device, meaning that, at a constant fan speed, a centrifugal fan will pump a constant volume of air rather than a constant mass. This means that the air velocity in a system is fixed even though mass flow rate through the fan is not.

== Standard cubic feet per minute ==
Standard cubic feet per minute (SCFM) is a volumetric flow-rate corrected to a set of "standardized" conditions of pressure, temperature, and relative humidity. The standard conditions are often defined as 14.7 psia, temperature 70°F and relative humidity 0%, but the conditions may vary depending on the "standard" used. (See Standard conditions for temperature and pressure).

== Normal cubic feet per minute ==
Normal cubic feet per minute (NCFM) refers to air at normal conditions, such as 14.7 psia, 68°F, 36% relative humidity. However, there is not an agreed upon definition for what constitutes normal conditions.

== Free air delivery ==
Free air delivery (FAD) indicates delivered air, referred to as "free air", at inlet conditions.

== Centrifugal fan rating ==
Ratings found in centrifugal fan performance tables and curves are based on standard cubic feet per minute (SCFM). Fan manufacturers define standard air as clean, dry air with a density of 0.075 pounds mass per cubic foot, with the atmospheric pressure at sea level of 29.92 inches of mercury and a temperature of 70°F. Selecting a centrifugal fan to operate at conditions other than standard air requires adjustment to both static pressure and brake horsepower. The volume of air will not be affected in a given system because a fan will move the same amount of air regardless of the air density.

If a centrifugal fan is to operate at a non-standard density, then corrections must be made to static pressure and brake horsepower. At higher than standard elevation, usually sea level, and higher than standard temperature (70°F), air density is lower than standard density (0.075 pounds per cubic foot). Centrifugal fans that are specified for continuous operation at higher temperatures need to be selected taking into account air density corrections. Again, a centrifugal fan is a constant volume device that will move the same amount of air at two different temperatures.

If, for example, a centrifugal fan moves 1,000 CFM at 70°F it will also move 1,000 CFM at 200°F. The air volume delivered by the centrifugal fan is not affected by density. However, since the 200°F air weighs much less than the 70°F air, the centrifugal fan will create less static pressure and will require less brake horsepower. When a centrifugal fan is specified for a given CFM and static pressure at conditions other than standard, an air density correction factor must be applied to select the proper size fan to meet the new condition. Since 200°F air weighs only 80% of 70°F air, the centrifugal fan will create less pressure. To get the actual pressure required at 200°F, the designer would have to multiply the pressure at standard conditions by an air density correction factor of 0.8 (i.e., 0.8/ 1.0) to get the system to operate correctly. To get the actual horsepower at 200°F, the designer would have to multiply the brake horsepower at standard conditions by the air density correction factor.

== Air Movement and Control Association fan rating ==
The centrifugal fan performance tables provide the fan revolutions per minute (RPM) and brake horsepower requirements for the given CFM and static pressure at standard air density (0.075 pounds per cubic foot). When the centrifugal fan performance is not at standard conditions, the performance must be converted to standard conditions before entering the performance tables. Centrifugal fans rated by the Air Movement and Control Association (AMCA) are tested in laboratories with test setups that simulate installations that are typical for that type of fan. Usually they are tested and rated as one of four standard installation types as designated in AMCA Standard 210.

AMCA Standard 210 defines uniform methods for conducting laboratory tests on housed fans to determine airflow rate, pressure, electric power and energy efficiency, at a given speed of rotation. The purpose of AMCA Standard 210 is to define exact procedures and conditions of fan testing so that ratings provided by various manufacturers are on the same basis and may be compared. For this reason, fans must be rated in SCFM.

== See also ==
- Cubic feet per minute (CFM)
- Standard cubic feet per minute (SCFM)
- Standard cubic foot (SCF)
- Million standard cubic feet per day (MMSCFD)
- Gas compressor
- Centrifugal fan
- Combined gas law
