= Air purge system =

Type of automatic cleaning for electrical systems

An air purge system is used to flush electrical control equipment with clean air before it is turned on. This ensures that the functionality of the equipment is not affected or damaged by the contaminants from the surrounding environment.

Air purge systems are employed for control and analytic technology that is exposed to flue gas resulting from an industrial process. Purging units are central because they maintain a clear boundary path and also ensure that the optical system of the instrument remains clean during prolonged operation. Some systems advanced processes serve to prevent corrosion of other system components by flue gas.

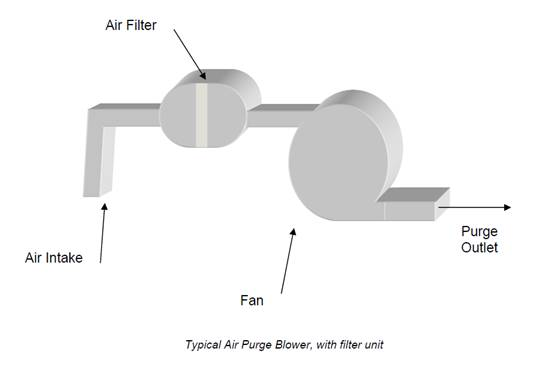

== Air requirements ==
Air drawn through the system must be clean, dry and oil free in order to protect the delicate optical equipment including mirrors and lenses. It is crucial that the design of the system ensures that the flow of air does not draw in any contaminants from outside sources. In a faultily designed system, dirt can be brought into the control area rather than drawn out as a result of the complexity of airflow components.

Although negative pressure might seem to draw an adequate amount of air through the affected area to prevent a buildup of dust and fumes, fluctuations in process conditions, operation anomalies, and environmental conditions when the plant is not operational can all lead to contamination and/or damage to instruments. These changing factors make purge air protection a vital element.

== Air purge blower systems ==
Blowers provide clean air to prevent contamination of electrical and optical surfaces from dirt, corrosive gases and overheating. Mains electricity is responsible for powering the blower’s motor. Different power ratings ensure that the required air flow is provided under different application conditions, duct pressures and hose lengths. Air flow from the blower depends on the type of fan and the mains supply voltage and frequency. Most air purge systems consist of a fan with a motor, some type of filter housing, and a filter cartridge, all stored in a weatherproof environment. Sometimes, pressure switches are employed to designate deficient pressure to ensure that the required flow is maintained.

=== Other considerations of blower systems ===
Pressure switches are also used to indicate blower failure. The differential pressure trip is connected to the inlet and the outlet of the main filter of the air blower. Failure is indicated by a decrease in the differential pressure. The low-pressure trip connects to the main filter outlet. If the pressure drops below a pre-set level, the trip relay operates. These two pressure trips act to indicate three statuses:

- System OK – Neither trip is operated
- Blower Failure – Both trips operated
- Filter Blocked – Only low trip operated

An air purge heating unit is used to ensure that the purge air remains at a temperature above the acid dew-point. This temperature is typically around 20 °C/68 °F. If temperatures are below this point, the controls will be corroded by condensation of compounds in the flue gas. Heated air ensures that controls are dry during startup.

The pressure drop in the length of air hose connecting the blower to the instrument is important when determining blow output requirements. Some systems have one blower unit providing air to two electronic instruments. In order to maintain equality in pressure, the hose lengths must be equal.

At the air inlet, air temperature must be lower than the upper ambient rating of the fan (typically 50 °C/122 °F). The position of air intake is at a point where the least amount of dust, oil, and moisture collects.

Fail safe shutters protect the instrument if the purge air supply fails. These are key in systems where the flue gas is under positive pressure and, therefore, is very corrosive. If the purge air fails, shutters allow the instrument to function for a few days without causing harm.

== Air mover systems ==
Air mover systems serve the same purpose as blower systems at a lower cost. However, this type of system can only be used when there is little or no back pressure because they generate lower pressure and airflow. Air mover functionality is based on the Venturi effect. A small amount of high velocity air connected to the side of the casting passes out through a nozzle, creating venturi action. This effect causes a large volume of low velocity air to flow through the venturi and out of the air diffuser. The ratio of air supplied depends on the design of the air mover’s physical structure.

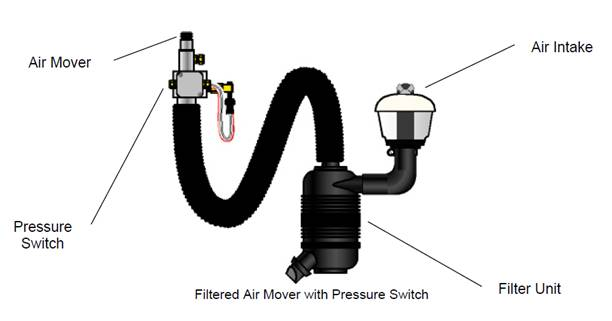

=== Other considerations for air movers ===
==== Condition of incoming air ====
It is not necessary to use a filter in an air mover in a relatively clean environment. Generally, a gauze filter is attached to the inlet to collect larger particles. However, filters are always a beneficial precaution. In environments with high ambient dust levels, it is beneficial to utilize a filter system that has double filtration. First, air passes through a pre-filter that collects larger dust particles. Second, the air travels through a screen filter where smaller particles are captured.

==== Pressure switches ====
An essential component of air mover systems is continual operational reliability. Failure of the system can lead to contamination of optical instruments. To ensure consistent functionality, a pressure switch can be used to indicate air failure when flow drops below a pre-set value. Under undesired flow conditions, an alarm will be activated or protective shutters will go into effect.

== See also ==
- Electrostatic precipitator
