= Rectiformer =

A rectiformer is a rectifier and transformer designed and built as a single entity for converting alternating current into direct current. It is a piece of power systems equipment rather than an electronic component. Rectiformers are used for supplying power to different field of ESP (electrostatic precipitator). Rectiformers are also used to create DC supply for Hall process cells in the aluminium smelting industry.

Rectiformers are commonly found in electrowinning operations, where a direct current is required to convert base metal ions such as copper to a metal at the cathode. The passage of an electric current through a purified copper sulfate solution produces cathode copper. The equation is as follows:

Cu^{2+}_{(aq)} + 2e^{−} => Cu_{(s)}

== Physical characteristics ==
Rectiformers may be designed to output voltages from 30V to over 120kV DC and can weigh over 400 tons.

== See also ==
- Power inverter
