= Alf Lysholm =

Swedish engineer

Alf James Rudolf Lysholm (14 December 1893 – 20 February 1973) was a Swedish engineer.

== Career ==
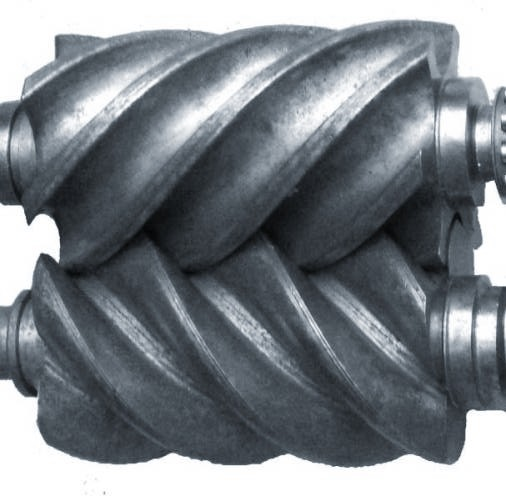
Rotors for a Lysholm screw compressor

Lysholm worked for the Ljungstrom steam turbine company, where he rose to become Chief Engineer.

He is noted for the invention of the rotary screw compressor, which he developed in the 1930s while working on a series of unsuccessful gas turbine engines.

He also developed the hydraulic torque converter. and the STAL Dovern turbojet engine.
