= Million standard cubic feet per day =

Unit of measurement for gases

Million standard cubic feet per day is a unit of measurement for gases that is predominantly used in the United States. It is frequently abbreviated MMSCFD. MMSCFD is commonly used as a measure of natural gas, liquefied petroleum gas, compressed natural gas and other gases that are extracted, processed or transported in large quantities.

A related measure is "mega standard cubic metres per day" (MSm^{3}/d), which is equal to 10^{6} Sm^{3}/d used in many countries outside the United States. One MMSCFD equals 1177.6 Sm^{3}/h.

When converting to mass flowrate, the density of the gas should be used at Standard temperature and pressure.

== See also ==
- SCFM
- Standard cubic foot
