= Standard cubic feet per minute =

Gas molar flow rate

Standard cubic feet per minute (SCFM) is the molar flow rate of a gas expressed as a volumetric flow at a "standardized" temperature and pressure thus representing a fixed number of moles of gas regardless of composition and actual flow conditions. It is related to the mass flow rate of the gas by a multiplicative constant which depends only on the molecular weight of the gas. There are different standard conditions for temperature and pressure, so care is taken when choosing a particular standard value. Worldwide, the "standard" condition for pressure is variously defined as an absolute pressure of 101,325 pascals (Atmospheric pressure), 1.0 bar (i.e., 100,000 pascals), 14.73 psia, or 14.696 psia and the "standard" temperature is variously defined as 68 °F, 60 °F, 0 °C, 15 °C, 20 °C, or 25 °C. The relative humidity (e.g., 36% or 0%) is also included in some definitions of standard conditions.

In Europe, the standard temperature is most commonly defined as 0 °C, but not always. In the United States, the EPA defines standard conditions for volume and volumetric flow as a temperature of 293 K (68 °F) and a pressure of 101.3 kilopascals (29.92 in. Hg), although various industry users may use definitions from 60 °F to 78 °F.

A variation in standard temperature can result in a significant volumetric variation for the same mass flow rate. For example, a mass flow rate of 1,000 kg/h of air at 1 atmosphere of absolute pressure is 455 SCFM when defined at 32 °F (0 °C) but 481 SCFM when defined at 60 °F (16 °C). Due to the variability of the definition and the consequences of ambiguity, it is best engineering practice to state what standard conditions are used when communicating a "standard" flow value.

In countries using the SI metric system of units, the term "normal cubic metre" (Nm^{3}) is very often used to denote gas volumes at some normalized or standard condition. Again, as noted above, there is no universally accepted set of normalized or standard conditions.

Unit	Pressure	Temperature	Moles
Nm³	1.01325 bar a	0 °C	0.0446158 kmol
Sm³	1.01325 bar a	15 °C	0.0422937 kmol
SCF	14.696 psi a	60 °F	0.002641 lbmol

== Actual cubic feet per minute ==
Actual cubic foot per minute (ACFM) is the volume of gas flowing anywhere in a system, taking into account its temperature and pressure. If the system were moving a gas at exactly the "standard" condition, then ACFM would equal SCFM. This usually is not the case as the most important change between these two definitions is the pressure. To move a gas, a positive pressure or a vacuum must be created. When positive pressure is applied to a standard cubic foot of gas, it is compressed. When a vacuum is applied to a standard cubic foot of gas, it expands. The volume of gas after it is pressurized or rarefied is referred to as its "actual" volume.

SCF and ACF for an ideal gas are related in accordance with the combined gas law:

$$\frac {P_1V_1} {T_1} = \frac {P_2V_2} {T_2}$$

Defining standard conditions by the subscript 1 and actual conditions by the subscript 2, then:

$${\rm SCF} = {\rm ACF}\,\cdot\,\left(\frac{P_{\rm actual}}{P_{\rm standard}}\right)\,\left(\frac{T_{\rm standard}}{T_{\rm actual}}\right)$$

where $P$ is in absolute pressure units and $T$ is in absolute temperature units (i.e., either kelvins or degrees Rankine).

This is only valid when at a pressure and temperature close to standard conditions. For non-ideal gasses (most gasses) a compressibility factor "Z" is introduced to allow for non-ideality. To introduce the compressibility factor to the equation divide ACF by "Z".

== Cubic feet per minute ==
Cubic feet per minute (CFM) is an often confusing term because it has no single definition that applies to all instances. Gases are compressible, which means that a figure in cubic feet per minute cannot necessarily be compared with another figure when it comes the mass of the gas. To further confuse the issue, a centrifugal fan is a constant CFM device or a constant volume device. This means that, provided the fan speed remains constant, a centrifugal fan will pump a constant volume of air. This is not the same as pumping a constant mass of air. Again, the fan will pump the same volume, though not mass, at any other air density. This means that the air velocity in a system is the same even though mass flow rate through the fan is not.

== See also ==
- Gas laws
- Standard conditions for temperature and pressure
- Standard cubic foot (SCF)
- Million standard cubic feet per day (MMSCFD)
