= Sullair =

American manufacturer

Sullair, L.L.C.
- Type: Limited Liability Company
- Industry: Industrial Equipment Manufacturing
- Founded: 1965
- Founder: Donald C. Hoodes
- Headquarters: Chicago, IL U.S.A.
- Key people: Charlie Takeuchi, President & CEO
- Products: Commercial and industrial air compressors. Portable Air Power for construction & mining, and Stationary Air Power systems for facilities.
- Owner: Hitachi
- Number of employees: 890
- Website: Sullair Global Home

Sullair is a major American manufacturer of portable and stationary rotary screw air compressors designed for commercial and industrial use. Founded in 1965 in the town of Michigan City, Indiana U.S.A., Sullair has manufacturing facilities in Michigan City that distribute and service air compressor packages and systems worldwide. Sullair also has manufacturing facilities in Suzhou, Jiangsu and Shenzhen, Guangdong China that service the Asian and Australasian markets. Sullair also has offices in Dandenong South, Australia near Melbourne, and in Sunderland, United Kingdom that services markets in the EMEA (Europe, Middle East, Africa) and Russia.

In April 2017, Hitachi acquired Sullair for US$1,245 billion.

== Rotary screw technology ==
Although the first commercial application of a fluid injected rotary-screw compressor was accomplished by Swedish industrial manufacturer Atlas Copco in 1957, it was Sullair's founding president, Don Hoodes, that introduced the technology to the U.S. domestic market in 1966. And by 1969, Sullair had developed an entire line of portable and stationary asymmetric rotary screw air compressors. Hoodes purchased the use of the technology from Swedish firm Svenska Rotor Maskiner, whose retired chief engineer, Alf Lysholm, invented the twin-screw compressor in 1934 while developing gas turbines. The Lysholm design is also used in vehicles to force air induction into engine cylinders, supercharging both gas and diesel powered engines to boost engine performance. Today, rotary screw compressors are the most popular type of air compressor in operation worldwide. Sullair's leadership decision to stay exclusively with the rotary screw technology when others still relied on piston driven technology, proved to be a valuable decision for the company, and was significant in its growth within the industry.

== Products ==
Today, Sullair has three primary product families -

- Portable Air Power - For markets where mobility of the compressor equipment is critical. Compressors are designed with on-board diesel engines as the power source, and most models made are towable or can be placed on work vehicles. These compressor packages are designed for ruggedness and reliability in order to withstand the physical burden of portability.
- Stationary Air Power - Compressor systems that are designed to be placed in a fixed position. Because compressed air is such a high demand ″utility″ among a large variety of markets, most stationary compressor installations are highly customized to fit each application. For this reason stationary air compressors and their associated after treatment products are part of a whole system design and are often configured into a facility's architecture.
- Original Equipment Manufactured (OEM) Components - Highly customized Sullair compressor units and portable air compressors are built to customer supplied requirements and specifications for inclusion in larger assemblies. OEM products serve the Drill, Process Gas, and Offshore Platform markets.

== History ==
- 1965: Donald C. Hoodes departed the Joy Manufacturing Company, a Pittsburgh-based manufacturer of mining and reciprocal compressor equipment, and founded a privately held company under the name of the Sullivan Machinery Company in Michigan City, Indiana. Hoodes as president brings with him from Joy Manufacturing Roger Gustafson, Borje Vagenius, and C.J. Joseph as Vice Presidents. Hoodes acquires a license to market the rotary screw technology from Svenska Rotor Maskiner AB (SRC) of Sweden.
- 1966: The Sullivan Machinery Company ships its first 150 CFM portable air compressor in April 1966. The company was the first in the domestic market to completely rely on rotary screw technology.
- 1968: The first stationary compressor rolls off the line. The Sullivan Machinery Company changes its business name to Sullair Corporation.
- 1969: Sullair headquarters and manufacturing facilities moves to 3700 East Michigan Blvd., Michigan City Indiana. Its main U.S. factory is still at this address today.
- 1972: Sullair becomes a public corporation in March 1972, trading under the symbol SULL. A subsidiary is established in Australia to sell products made in Michigan City. Added track-mounted rock drills and refrigeration compressors to the line of products.
- 1973: A cash infusion from the public offering allows the building of a new fabrication plant to manufacture rotors. Added a 40,000 sq ft warehouse and a 7,000 sq ft office expansion.
- 1974: Sullair grants a license to a major Japanese company to manufacture compressors for sale in Japan and South Korea.
- 1975: First to develop a totally synthetic lifetime compressor fluid called 24KT. Replacement of the fluid is virtually eliminated because of its resistance to breakdown. Sullair extended its warranty from two years to ten years on 24KT machines based on this new fluid technology.
- 1977: Introduces the EES (Energy Efficiency System) heat recovery system. Sullair Asia is established in Singapore.
- 1978: A joint venture establishes Sullair in Argentina.
- 1979: Introduces oil-free dry screw compressor line.
- 1980: Establishes the Sullair Mining Equipment Company to produce a line of underground drilling equipment.
- 1981: Sullair is listed on the NYSE under the stock symbol SUL.
- 1982: Introduces two-stage "tandem" air compressors. Sullair opens a new facility in Houston, Texas to expand from air compressors to gas compressors to serve the hydrocarbon and chemical processing industries.
- 1984: Sullair is purchased by the Sundstrand Corporation in October 1984.
- 1985: Introduces a full line of pneumatic hand tools to complement their portable air compressor line.
- 1988: First Encapsulated compressor system combines motor, compressor unit, cooling unit, and air-fluid separator all into one fixed component.
- 1994: Enters China market with joint venture that creates the Shenzhen Sullair Asia Company, Ltd.
- 1999: United Technologies, Inc. (UTC) purchases Sundstrand Corporation and merges operations with Hamilton Standard to form the Hamilton Sundstrand business unit. Sullair develops After Cooled and Filtered (AF) instrument quality air compressors.
- 2001: Launches Variable Speed Drive (VSD) compressors with on-board computers that control motor output to match current usage demand.
- 2002: Sullair acquires Champion Compressors, Australia's largest manufacturer of rotary screw air compressors, and begins trading as Sullair Australia on November 1.
- 2003: Launches the industry's first 500psig high-pressure portable rotary-screw compressor package.
- 2004: Shenzhen Sullair Asia Company, Ltd. in China forms joint venture with IHI of Japan to produce centrifugal compressor systems.
- 2006: Releases new S-energy line of stationary compressors. S-energy wins 2006 Product of the Year by Plant Engineering magazine.
- 2008: Shenzhen Sullair Asia Company, Ltd. opens a second facility in Suzhou, China. Named the Suzhou Sullair Air Equipment Company, Ltd.
- 2012: In July 2012, UTC acquired aerospace giant Goodrich for $16.5 billion and merged the business with Hamilton Sundstrand to form UTC Aerospace Systems. Also in July 2012, The Carlyle Group and BC Partners agree to acquire the three businesses of the Hamilton Sundstrand Industrials group; Sullair, Sundyne, and Milton Roy from United Technologies for $3.46 Billion.
- 2017: Hitachi bought compressor manufacturer Sullair from Accudyne Industries for US$1.245 billion.
