= Standard cubic foot =

Measure of quantity of gas

A standard cubic foot (scf) is a unit representing the amount of gas (such as natural gas) contained in a volume of one cubic foot at reference temperature and pressure conditions. It is the unit commonly used when following the customary system, a collection of standards set by the National Institute of Standards and Technology. Another unit used for the same purpose is the standard cubic metre (Sm^{3}), derived from SI units, representing the amount of gas contained in a volume of one cubic meter at different reference conditions. The reference conditions depend on the type of gas and differ from other standard temperature and pressure conditions.

== Usage ==
The scf and the scm are units of molecular quantity for gases can be used with the ideal gas law to compute the quantity per unit of volume for other pressures and temperatures. In spite of the label "standard", there is a variety of definitions, mainly depending on the type of gas. Since, for a given volume, the quantity is proportional to the pressure and temperature, each definition fixes base values for pressure and temperature.

=== Natural gas ===
Since natural gas is an imprecise mix of various molecular species, chiefly methane but with varying proportions of other gases, a standard cubic foot of natural gas does not represent a precise unit of mass, but a molecular quantity, expressed in moles.

For petroleum gases, the standard cubic foot (scf) is defined as one cubic foot of gas at 60 °F (288.7 K; 15.56 °C) and at normal sea level air pressure. The pressure definition differs between sources, but are all close to normal sea level air pressure.

- A pressure of 14.696 pounds per square inch (1.00000 atm; 101.325 kPa). This is the same pressure as the SI system standard pressure. Gives 1.1953 moles per scf.
- A pressure of 101.35 kilopascals (1.0002 atm; 14.700 psi). Gives 1.1956 moles per scf.
- A pressure of 14.73 pounds per square inch (1.0023 atm; 101.56 kPa). This value is very close to 30 inches of mercury. Gives 1.1981 moles per scf or 0.002641 pound moles per scf.

The standard cubic meter of gas (scm) is used in the context of the SI system. It is similarly defined as the quantity of gas contained in a cubic meter at a temperature of 15 °C (288.150 K; 59.000 °F) and a pressure of 101.325 kilopascals (1.0000 atm; 14.696 psi).

Converting volume units between the standard cubic foot and the standard cubic meter is not exact, as the base temperature and pressure used are different, but for most practical situations the difference can be ignored. Comparing the same volume between the 15 °C (288.15 K) and 101.325 kPa standard cubic meter versus the 60 °F (288.71 K) and 14.73 psi (101.56 kPa) standard cubic foot gives an error of 0.04%. A standard cubic foot in the US Customary System is approximately equivalent to 0.02833 standard cubic meters in the SI system.

In the natural gas industry, where quantities are often expressed in standard cubic feet, large multiples of standard cubic feet are generally not expressed with metric prefixes, but rather with prefixes based on roman numerals, where the s for "standard" is often omitted. Common units of gas volumes include ccf (hundred standard cubic feet), Mcf (thousand standard cubic feet), and MMcf (million standard cubic feet). The "M" refers to the Roman numeral for thousand, while a double "M" ("MM") represent one thousand thousands, or one million. Bcf (billion standard cubic feet), Tcf (trillion standard cubic feet), Qcf (quadrillion standard cubic feet), etc., are also used.

=== Compressed or liquefied gases in refillable cylinders ===
The National Conference on Weights and Measures, a US-based non-profit organization working in cooperation with the US National Institute of Standards and Technology, has defined a set of standards in a regulation entitled the "Uniform Regulation for the Method of Sale of Commodities". This regulation defines a standard cubic foot, for compressed or liquefied gases in refillable cylinders other than LPG by, "A standard cubic foot of gas is defined as a cubic foot at a temperature of 21 °C (70 °F) and a pressure of 101.325 kilopascals [kPa] (14.696 psia)".

=== Industrial gases ===
Yet other definitions are in use for industrial gas, where, in the US, a standard cubic foot for industrial gas use is defined at 70 °F (21.1 °C) and 14.696 psia (101.325 kPa), while in Canada, a standard cubic meter for industrial gas use is defined at 15 °C (59 °F) and 101.325 kPa (14.696 psia).

== Converting actual volumes to standard volumes ==
An actual volume can be converted to a standard volume using the following equation:

V_{s} = V_{a} × F_{p} × F_{t} × (F_{pv})^{2}

Where,

V_{s}: standard volume
V_{a}: actual volume (sometimes shown as V_{r} for registered volume)
F_{p}: pressure factor (sometimes shown as P_{m} for pressure multiplier)

F_{p}: absolute pressure / standard pressure = (line gauge pressure + atmospheric pressure)/base pressure

F_{t}: temperature factor (sometimes shown as T_{m} for temperature multiplier)

F_{t}: absolute standard temperature / absolute line temperature = [273.15 + standard temperature (°C)] / [273.15 + line temperature (°C)] or [459.67 + standard temperature (°F)] / [459.67 + line temperature (°F)]

F_{pv}: super compressibility factor (often omitted or shown as equaling 1)

Example: How many standard cubic feet are in 1 cubic foot of gas at 80 °F and gauge pressure 50 psi? (assuming that there is 13.6 psi atmospheric pressure and ignoring super compressibility)

V_{s} = 1 cu ft × [(13.6 psi + 50 psi) / 14.73 psi] × [(60 °F + 459.67 °F) / (80 °F + 459.67 °F)]
V_{s} = 4.16 scf

== See also ==
- Standard cubic feet per minute
