= ISO/TC 67 =

ISO Technical Committee 67 – Oil and gas industries including lower carbon energy is a technical committee within the International Organization for Standardization (ISO). ISO/TC 67 is responsible for developing and maintaining international standards in the worldwide upstream, midstream and downstream oil and gas industry and related lower carbon energy activities. Its role encompasses the harmonisation of standards for facilities, equipment and operations used for drilling, production, pipeline transport and processing of liquids and gaseous hydrocarbons on, and between, offshore oil and gas installations and onshore terminals and oil refineries.

== History ==
American oil companies were the first to develop standards for the oil and gas industry. American trade associations such as the American Petroleum Institute (founded in 1919), the American Society of Mechanical Engineers (ASME), ASTM International, NACE International and the National Fire Protection Association (NFPA) developed Standards, Codes and Recommended Practices that were recognised and used around the world.

TC 67 was initially established when ISO was founded in 1947.

Exploitation of the oil and gas resources took place in other regions, for example, the development of oil and gas in the North Sea began in the 1960s and 1970s. In these regions oil companies developed in-house standards and specifications for aspects of their operations which were not covered by the American Standards. There were therefore a large number of codes, standards and procedures developed by companies; national, regional and international standardisation bodies; and industry associations. To better achieve harmonisation, consistency and conformity of standards on a worldwide basis TC 67 was reactivated in 1989.

The need for common standards was also informed by the creation of the European Single Market on 1 January 1993. This abolished trade restrictions for the 19 nations in the European Economic Area. It required open procurement for the upstream oil industry with technical specifications based on European or other commonly accepted standards.

Up to 1995 ISO/TC 67 focussed on creating an effective working committee structure and producing a prioritized work programme. During the period 1995 to 2000 the focus was on the development and publication of International Standards, see graphs below.

TC 67 was formerly titled 'Materials, equipment and offshore structures for petroleum and natural gas industries' then ‘Materials, equipment and offshore structures for petroleum, petrochemical and natural gas industries’, before adopting its present name in the 2022.

TC 67’s stated mission is ‘to create value-added standards for the oil and natural gas industries’. And its vision is for ‘international standards used locally worldwide’.

== Committee structure ==
Oversight of the operation of TC 67 is the responsibility of the Management Committee ISO/TC 67/MC; there is also a Secretariat.

Detailed work is undertaken by eight subcommittees designated ISO/TC 67/SC x

- SC 2 Pipeline transportation systems
- SC 3 Drilling and completion fluids, well cements and treatment fluids
- SC 4 Drilling, production and injection equipment
- SC 5 Casing, tubing and drill pipe
- SC 6 Processing equipment, piping, systems and related safety
- SC 7 Offshore structures
- SC 8 Arctic operations
- SC 9 Production, transport and storage facilities for cryogenic liquefied gases
- SC 10 Enhanced oil recovery

Subcommittees may have working groups, for example SC 6 has five working group including ISO/TC 67/SC 6/WG 12 Pressure-relieving and depressuring systems

There are nine working groups which report directly to TC 67, these are designated ISO/TC 67/WG x

- WG 2 Operating integrity management for the petroleum, petrochemical and natural gas industries
- WG 4 Reliability engineering and technology
- WG 5 Aluminium alloy pipes
- WG 7 Corrosion resistant materials
- WG 8 Materials, corrosion control, welding and jointing, and non-destructive examination (NDE)
- WG 11 Coating and lining of structures and equipment
- WG 13 Bulk materials for offshore projects
- WG 14 Fuel ammonia combustion boiler
- WG 15 Green and lower carbon

The chair of TC 67 and its subcommittees changes periodically. TC 67 is currently (December 2023) chaired by BP, SC 6 is chaired by France (AFNOR), SC 8 by the Russian Federation (GOST R), etc

There are also joint working groups with other Technical Committees such as TC 115, TC 118 and TC 192. These are for mechanical equipment such as centrifugal pumps, positive displacement pumps, shaft sealing systems, turbo compressors/expanders, reciprocating compressors, rotary type positive displacement compressors, and gas turbines.

National committees and working groups shadow the TC 67 subcommittees and provide national input into the standards. These groups generally work under the auspices of the national standards bodies. These include the British Standards Institute (BSI, UK), Deutsches Institut für Normung (DIN, Germany) and Association Française de Normalisation (AFNOR, France).

In the UK the TC 67 shadow committee is PSE/17 – Materials and equipment for petroleum, petrochemical and natural gas industries.

== Standards development ==
New standards are proposed and developed through the normal ISO procedures (ISO Directives Part 1 and 2). Alternatively they can be developed through collaboration between the appropriate TC 67 subcommittee and the International Association of Oil & Gas Producers (IOGP).

=== Workscope ===
There are currently (January 2021) 225 published ISO standards related to the TC 67 and its subcommittees and working groups. There are also 29 ISO standards under development. A diagrammatic map listing the TC 67 standards and the locations where they apply has been produced by TC 67.

The cumulative increase of standards published by TC 67 since 1994
The annual output of standards published by TC 67 since 1994

== Co-published standards ==
Published ISO Standards may be based on existing trade association standards which may then co-exist with the ISO Standard. The standard can be amended or qualified by national or regional standards bodies.

An ISO international standard can be published as a supplement to an API Standard via normative references and its technical content. API Standards can be readopted from ISO standards either as identical adoptions or with modifications.

For example, the American Petroleum Institute first published its Recommended Practice API RP 14C Analysis, Design, Installation, and Testing of Safety Systems for Offshore Production Facilities in 1974. The 4th edition of 14C was published by API in 1986 and was adopted by ISO and published as ISO 10418:1993 in 1993. This has been updated several times and the current edition is ISO 10418:2019 Petroleum and natural gas industries Offshore production installations Process safety systems.

ISO 10418:2019 was published in Europe by the Comité Européen de Normalisation (CEN) as EN ISO 10418:2019 (with the same title). EN standards are also published in the 33 member states of CEN. In the United Kingdom EN ISO 10418 was published by the British Standards Institute (BSI) as BS EN ISO 10418:2019 (same title).

== Relationship between codes and standards ==
There are inter-relationships between TC 67 standards and other standards, codes, technical methodologies and regulations. For example, for the oil and gas processing plant on an offshore installations operating in the UK there are four relevant ISO 67 standards, an IEC Standard, two API standards, a range of assessment techniques, and three UK legislative regulations. The relationships are illustrated in the diagram. Other countries have specific requirements, for example, Norway may use Offshore Standards DNVGL-OS-E201 Oil and gas processing systems.

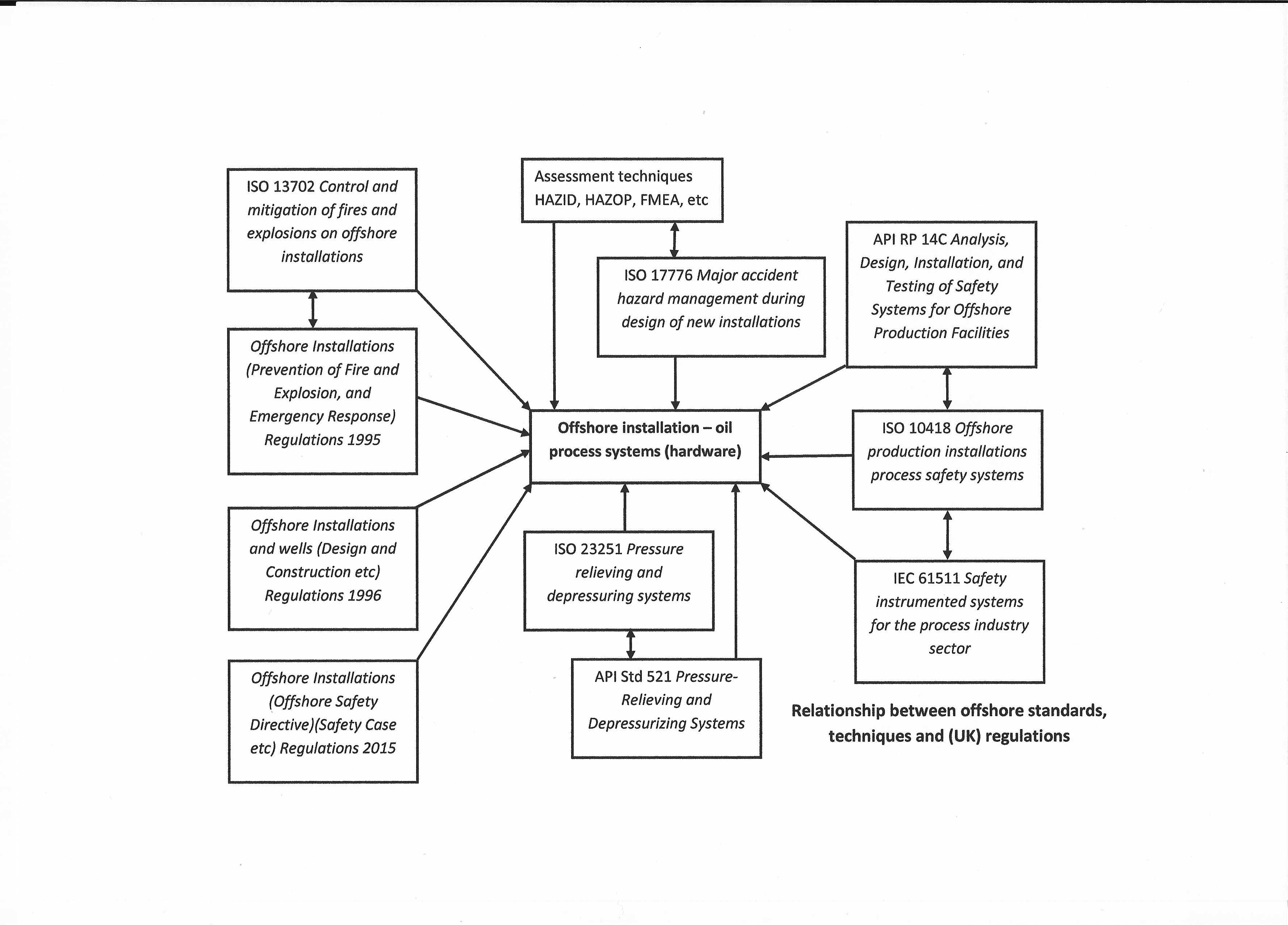

== See also ==
- Petroleum
- Oil platform
- Oil industry
- Upstream (oil industry)
- Oil refinery
- Oil production plant
- Oil and gas law in the United States
