= Crude oil stabilisation =

Distillation process

Crude oil stabilisation (or stabilization) is a partial distillation process that renders crude oil suitable for storage in atmospheric tanks, or of a quality suitable for sales or pipeline transportation. Stabilisation is achieved by subjecting ‘live’ crude to temperature and pressure conditions in a fractionation vessel, which drives off light hydrocarbon components to form a ‘dead’ or stabilised crude oil with a lower vapour pressure.

== Specification ==
Typically, the live crude from an oil production installation would have a vapour pressure of 120 psia at 100 °F (726 kPa at 37.8 °C) or 125 psig at 60 °F (862 kPa at 15.5 °C). After stabilisation dead crude would have a Reid vapour pressure of 9 – 10 psig at 100 °F (62 – 69 kPa at 37.8 °C).

== The stabilisation process ==
Live crude is heated in a furnace or heat exchanger to an elevated temperature. The crude oil is fed to a stabiliser which is typically a tray or packed tower column that achieves a partial fractionation or distillation of the oil. The heavier components, pentane (C_{5}H_{12}), hexane (C_{6}H_{14}), and higher hydrocarbons (C_{7}+), flow as liquid down through the column where the temperature is increasingly higher. At the bottom of the column, some of the liquid is withdrawn and circulated through a reboiler which adds heat to the tower. Here the lighter fractions are finally driven off as a gas, which rises up through the column. At each tray or stage, the rising gas strips the light ends from heavy ends, and the rising gas becomes richer in the light components and leaner in the heavy ends.

Alternatively, if a finer separation is required the column may be provided with an upper section reflux system making it similar to a distillation column. As the reflux liquid flows down through the column it becomes leaner in light components and richer in heavy ends. Overhead gas from the stabiliser passes through a back pressure control valve that maintains the pressure in the stabiliser.

The stabilised crude oil, comprising pentane and higher hydrocarbons (C_{5}+), is drawn from the base of the stabiliser and is cooled. This may be by heat exchange with the incoming live crude and by cooling water in a heat exchanger. The dead, stabilised crude flows to tanks for storage or to a pipeline for transport to customers such as an oil refinery.

The stabilisation tower may typically operate at approximately 50 to 200 psig (345 – 1378 kPa). Where the crude oil contains high levels of hydrogen sulphide (H_{2}S) a sour stabilisation is undertaken. This entails operating the stabiliser at the lower end of the pressure range, whereas sweet (low H_{2}S) stabilisation would take place at a higher pressure.

== Gas processing ==
The light hydrocarbons stripped from the crude are usually processed to yield useful products. Gas from the top of the stabiliser column is compressed and fed to a de-methanizer column. This column separates the lightest hydrocarbons, methane (CH_{4}) and ethane (C_{2}H_{6}), from the heavier components. Methane and ethane are withdrawn from the top of the column and are used as fuel gas in the plant. Excess gas may be flared.

Liquid from the base of the de-methanizer is routed to the de-ethanizer. Gas from the top is principally ethane and is compressed and returned to the de-methanizer.

Liquid from the base of the de-ethanizer is routed to the de-propanizer. Gas from the top is principally propane (C_{3}H_{8}) and is compressed or chilled for storage and sales.

Liquid from the base of the de-propanizer is principally butane (C_{4}H_{10}) and some heavier components. Butane is stored and sold, and the heavier fraction is sold or spiked into the stabilised crude.

== See also ==
- Oil production plant
- Oil platform
- Upstream (oil industry)
- Oil industry
- Flotta oil terminal
- Sullom Voe terminal
