= Abdulahi Bashir-Haske =

Nigerian businessman (born 1987)

- Born: 13 December 1987 (age 38); Yola, Nigeria

Abdullahi Bashir-Haske MFR (born 13 December 1987, Yola) is a Nigerian businessman. He is the founder and group managing director of AA&R Investment Group, a conglomerate with interests in oil and gas, agriculture, information and communication technology, aviation, marine services and logistics. His company, Etihad Oilfield Services is credited for discovering oil in the Kolmani River area in Bauchi State. Haske holds the traditional title of "Ciroma-Ganye of Adamawa" in recognition of his business and social impact in his home state of Adamawa.

== Business career ==
Haske began his business career in 2005 offering general contracting services to private and public organizations and trading in agro-commodities and petroleum products. He later established AA&R Investment Group – a conglomerate with several subsidiaries in diversified industries including agriculture, oil and gas, logistics, aviation, marine services and ICT. His company, Manomi Support Services Limited, a community based agricultural production firm manages 15,000 hectares of land across several Nigerian states with over 2,000 employees. His H & W Rice Company Limited, an integrated rice miller is one of the largest millers in northern Nigeria with an annual production of 48,000 tons of paddy.

Haske is known mainly in the Nigeria oil and gas industry with diversified investments in upstream and downstream sectors with several companies including Mars Exploration and Production Limited, an indigenous exploration and production, and Etihad Oilfield Services Limited. Etihad Oilfield Services is known for its role in the discovery of oil and gas in commercial quantity in the Kolmani River area around Bauchi and Gombe states in the north east of Nigeria. Haske is reported to own 51% stakes in four oil blocks which include OML 123, OML 124, OML 126, and OML 137.

== Controversy ==
In July 2025, Haske was arrested and briefly detained by the Economic and Financial Crimes Commission (EFCC) over allegations of corruption, financial fraud, money laundering, irregular private jet operations, and questionable contracts linked to the Nigerian National Petroleum Company Limited (NNPCL). On 21 August 2025, the EFCC declared Haske wanted for alleged criminal conspiracy and money laundering.

As of November 2025, the EFCC webpage containing the wanted notice (https://www.efcc.gov.ng/efcc/news-and-information/wanted-persons-1/11348-wanted-abdullahi-bashir-haske) has been removed from the Commission’s official website, returning a “404 Page Not Found” error. The EFCC has not issued any public clarification or follow-up statement regarding the removal.

== Awards and honours ==
- Africa Energy Rising Star Award (2020)
- Northern Nigeria Peace Award (2022)
- Member Of The Order Of The Federal Republic (MFR) 2023
- ThisDay Young Global Leaders Awards (2024)
