= Eftedal =

Eftedal is a Norwegian surname. Notable people with the surname include:

- Ingrid Eftedal (born 1965), Norwegian molecular biologist and barophysiologist
- Siri Eftedal (born 1966), Norwegian team handball player
- Thomas Eftedal (born 1978), Norwegian footballer
