= Gulf Petrochem =

United Arab Emirates-based oil and energy company

Gulf Petrochem Group is a company operating in the downstream and midstream sectors of the oil and energy industry. It has six divisions in Oil Trading and Bunkering, Oil Refining, Grease Manufacturing, Oil Terminals, Bitumen Manufacturing, and Shipping and Logistics.

== History ==
Gulf Petrochem was founded by brothers Ashok Goel and Sudhir Goyel. In 1998 they obtained the rights to commission a refinery in Sharjah's Hamriyah Freezone alongside a grease manufacturing plant producing lithium base grease.

In 2007 Gulf Petrochem entered into Fujairah through the construction of a 112,233 square metres (1,208,070 sq ft) oil terminal with a total storage capacity of 412,000 cubic metres (14,500,000 cu ft) to handle Class III petroleum products such as Fuel Oil, Gas Oil and Cutter Stock. In Hamriyah, the facility has a total of 14 tanks, with pipelines for white and black products.

In 2010 trading offices were established in Singapore and Dubai. The company is now trading in fuel, gas, base oil and bitumen with offices in 15 countries.

In 2014 Gulf Petrochem announced an acquisition of the Royal Dutch Shell Specialties Bitumen plant at Savli, near Vadodara in Gujarat, India. It also made an open offer to acquire 26% of Sah Petroleums Ltd, a manufacturer of industrial and automotive oil lubricants in India, from its public shareholders. This follows the group's 72.23% acquisition of the company on 31 July 2014, pursuant to a share purchase agreement.

== Operations ==
- Manufacturing and Refining: Gulf Petrochem has two refineries handling feedstock and finished products and capacities that produce naphtha, MTO, Gas Oil and Fuel Oil. It also has capacity for grease manufacturing and Bitumen manufacturing. Gulf Petrochem is building a refinery in Tanzania that will be used as medium and heavy crude distillation units and distillate products will be naphtha, MTO gas oil and fuel oil.
- Bunkering: In 2012, Gulf Petrochem began supplying Khor Fakkan and Jebel Ali bunker market. In India, India Pvt Ltd, a subsidiary of Gulf Petrochem FZC, is a physical bunker supplier at Gujarat Port.
- Storage: Gulf Petrochem has three storage facilities for vessel loads of feedstock:
  - The Hamriyah oil terminal
  - The Fujairah oil terminal
  - The Pipavav oil terminal in Gujarat
- Shipping and Logistics: Gulf Petrochem charters and owns a fleet of eight ships ranging from.
- Oil Trading: Gulf Petrochem has trading offices in London, Geneva, New Delhi, Mumbai, Dubai Panama, Singapore and Rotterdam.

== Other Activities ==
Gulf Petrochem founded the ASPAM Foundation that supports orphans across India.

== Board of directors ==
- Ashok Goel, Chairman
- Sudhir Goyel, Managing Director
- Prerit Goel, Group Director
- Manan Goel, Group Director
- Ayush Goel, Director
