= ISO 20815 =

ISO logo

ISO 20815 is the International Organization for Standardization (ISO) standard for production assurance and reliability management in the petroleum, petrochemical and natural gas industries.

The 2008 version of the standard was reviewed and confirmed in 2012. It was replaced by ISO/DIS 20815:2018 in October 2018, which in turn has been superseded by ISO/DIS 20815:2026 in September 2026.

The division of the oil and gas industry into upstream, midstream and downstream sectors is referred to in the standard.
