= Downstream Oil and Gas Regulatory Agency =

Indonesian oil and gas regulatory government agency

- Badan Pengatur Hilir Minyak dan Gas Bumi

Agency overview
- Formed: 2002
- Headquarters: South Jakarta, Jakarta Indonesia
- Agency executives: Erika Retnowati, Head of BPH Migas; Patuan Alfon S., Secretary of BPH Migas
- Key document: Law No. 22 of 2001 on Oil and Gas, Presidential Regulation No. 86 of 2002, Government Regulation No. 67 of 2002 (amended by Government Regulation No. 45 of 2012)
- Website: https://www.bphmigas.go.id/

Logo of BPH Migas (2002–2025)

The Downstream Oil and Gas Regulatory Agency (Indonesian: Badan Pengatur Hilir Minyak dan Gas Bumi; BPH Migas) is the government body in Indonesia responsible for regulating the downstream sector of the oil and gas industry within the country, which involves overseeing the processing, distribution, and sale stages. BPH Migas ensures the orderly supply, distribution, and accessibility of oil and gas across Indonesia.

Mandated by Law No. 22 of 2001 on Oil and Gas, BPH Migas was formally established under Presidential Regulation No. 86 of 2002 and Government Regulation No. 67 of 2002 (later amended by Government Regulation No. 45 of 2012). BPH Migas operates independently of other agencies and reports directly to the president of Indonesia, in accordance with Article 2 paragraph (2) and Article 8 of the 2002 Presidential Regulation respectively.

== Functions ==
BPH Migas' functions include regulating fuel availability and distribution, setting national fuel reserves to protect against supply disruptions, establishing tariffs for natural gas transportation via pipelines, and determining gas prices for households and small businesses.
