= Norwegian Ocean Industry Authority =

Norwegian governmental supervisory authority

- Havindustritilsynet
- Petroleum Safety Authority logo

Agency overview
- Formed: 1 January 2004
- Preceding agency: Norwegian Petroleum Directorate
- Type: Regulatory and oversight
- Jurisdiction: Norway
- Headquarters: Stavanger
- Agency executive: Magne Ognedal
- Parent agency: Ministry of Labour and Social Inclusion
- Website: www.psa.no (until 2023) www.havtil.no (from 2024)

Map
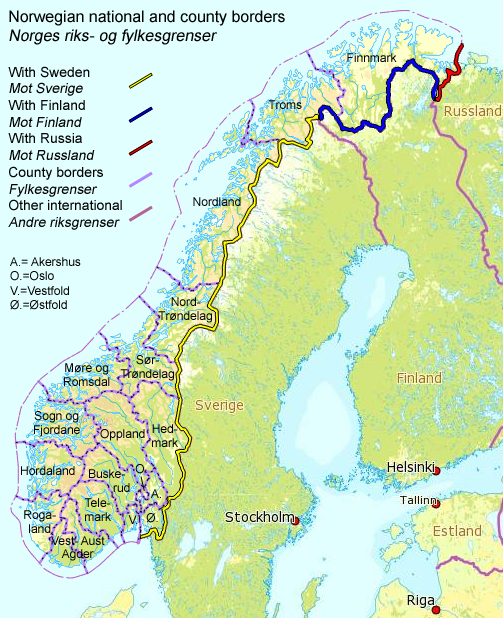
- Map of Norway showing territorial waters

The Norwegian Ocean Industry Authority (Norwegian: Havindustritilsynet, abbreviated Havtil), formrly Petroleum Safety Authority (PSA) is a Norwegian governmental supervisory authority under the Norwegian Ministry of Labour and Social Inclusion. The authority has regulatory responsibility for safety, emergency preparedness and the working environment in petroleum-industry activities in Norway, both on land and offshore. The first director was Magne Ognedal, and since 2013 Anne Myhrvold.

The PSA was established on 1 January 2004 as an independent, governmental supervisory body, partitioned from the Norwegian Petroleum Directorate. Its headquarters are located in Stavanger. In 2023, it was announced that it would change its name to the Norwegian Ocean Industry Authority effective 1 January 2024.

== Responsibilities ==
The PSA has regulatory responsibility for safety, emergency preparedness and the working environment in the petroleum activities, including petroleum facilities and associated pipeline systems at Melkøya, Tjeldbergodden, Nyhamna, Kollsnes, Mongstad, Sture, Kårstø and Slagentangen, as well as any future, integrated petroleum facilities.

The regulatory responsibility covers all phases of the activities; such as planning, engineering, construction, use and finally, removal.

The Norwegian government has assigned the Petroleum Safety Authority Norway the following tasks:

- The PSA shall, through its own supervision and through cooperation with other authorities in the HSE area, ensure that the petroleum activities and other associated activities are followed up in a comprehensive manner.
- The PSA shall furthermore carry out information and advisory activities vis-à-vis the players in the industry, establish practical cooperative relationships with other national and international HSE authorities, as well as contribute actively to the transfer of knowledge in the area of health, safety and environment in society in general.
- The PSA shall issue statements to its superior government ministry regarding matters which are under consideration and provide assistance to the ministry when requested.

In the broadest sense, the entire work and purpose of the Petroleum Safety Authority Norway is to ensure that the petroleum activities are conducted prudently as regards health, environment and safety. The ministry has issued the following guidelines for how the PSA should carry out its tasks:

Follow-up shall be system-oriented and risk-based. This follow-up must be in addition to, and not instead of, the follow-up which the industry carries out for its own part. There shall be a balanced consideration between the PSA's role as a high risk/technological supervisory body and as a labour inspection authority. Participation and cooperation between the parties are important principles and integral preconditions for the activities of the Petroleum Safety Authority Norway.

== Activities ==
In 2005, the PSA was made part of the Coexistence Group II working group, a joint project of the Norwegian government, the Institute of Marine Research, the Norwegian Fishermen's Association, the Norwegian Foundation for Nature Research and the Norwegian Oil Industry Association. Coexistence Group II's mission is to explore the feasibility of coexistence between the fishing and petroleum industries in Norwegian waters. The PSA also coordinates supervisory responsibility with Norway's national Health Examination Survey (HES).

== See also ==
- History of the petroleum industry in Norway
- Standardization in oil industry
