= Tempa Rossa oil field =

Oil field in Southern Apennines, Italy

Tempa Rossa
- Country: Italy
- Region: Southern Apennines
- Location: Southern Apennines
- Offshore/onshore: Onshore
- Operator: TotalEnergies
- Partners: TotalEnergies, Royal Dutch Shell, ExxonMobil

Field history
- Discovery: 1989
- Start of production: 2011
- Peak year: 2015
- Abandonment: 2020+

Production
- Current production of oil: 50,000 barrels per day (~2.5×10^{6} t/a)
- Estimated oil in place: 200 million barrels (~2.7×10^{7} t)

The Tempa Rossa oil field is an oil field located in Corleto Perticara (Basilicata region) in the concession area known as Gorgoglione. It was discovered in 1989 and developed by TotalEnergies. It is expected to begin production in 2016 and will produce oil and gas. The total proven reserves of the Tempa Rossa oil field are around 200 million barrels (29.3 million tonnes), and peak production is expected to be around 50,000 barrels per day (7,900 m^{3}/d) of oil.

On March 18, 2013, Total finalized an agreement to sell 25% of its shares in the oil field to Mitsui E&P Italia A S.r.l.

TotalEnergies announces in its website that the "centro olio" ("oil center") became operational in 2020 and it spans an area of approximately 190,000 m², with a processing capacity of 50,000 barrels of crude oil per day. It also produces 240 tons of liquefied petroleum gas (LPG), 230,000 cubic meters of methane gas, and 75 tons of sulfur.

A composite geological cross-section (based on reflection seismic data) covering the oil exploration permits in the southern Apennines, specifically the Val d’Agri area, spanning the provinces of Potenza, Matera, and Cosenza. The focus of hydrocarbon exploration is on the carbonates of the Outer Apulian Platform (Jurassic–Cretaceous). The subsurface structure of this area, proceeding from SW to NE, follows a mountain range–forebasin–foreland pattern; the Mesozoic carbonates that constitute the target of the oil exploration are buried beneath a thick, allochthonous sequence of an highly tectonized mountain range and partially deformed forebasin units. Vertical scale in TWT (two-way time). Text in Italian.
