= Myhrvold =

Myhrvold is a surname. Notable people with the surname include:

- Aage Myhrvold (1918–1987), Norwegian cyclist
- Anne Myhrvold (born 1966), Norwegian civil servant
- Arne Myhrvold (born 1945), Norwegian sports official
- Dagmar Myhrvold (1898–1972), Norwegian actress
- Mathilde Myhrvold (born 1998), Norwegian cross-country skier
- Nathan Myhrvold (born 1959), American business executive
- Ole André Myhrvold (born 1978), Norwegian politician
