= E&P =

E&P may stand for:

- Editor & Publisher, an American monthly trade news magazine
- Exploration and production, the upstream sector of the oil-and-gas industry
