= Standardization in oil industry =

Standardization in oil industry seeks to promote a better standardization within the oil and energy industry. It promotes this objective by highlighting areas where standardization has worked well, where it has not, and why. This provokes discussions for better standardization. The overall purpose of the document is to issue a guideline on the application of IEC 61508 and IEC 61511 in the Norwegian Petroleum Industry, and thereby simplify the use of the standards.

According to the Petroleum Safety Authority Norway (PSA), management regulations (§1 and §2), performance requirements shall be established for all safety barriers on an installation. For instrumented safety systems, special reference is made to IEC 61508 and this document as the recommended standard for specification, design and operation of such safety systems.

Whereas IEC 61508 describes a fully risk-based approach for determining Safety Integrity Level (SIL) requirements, this document provides minimum SIL requirements for the most common instrumented safety functions on a petroleum production installation (ref. chapter 7). Deviations from these requirements may however be identified (ref. section 7.7), and in such case, the overall methodology and documentation should be in accordance with IEC 61508.

== Conventional industry practice ==
There are still many standards in use within the industry. Shell for example use the IPF method, BP has its own. These standards could be supplements to areas lacking within the standards. Experience shows that the majors tend to go against standards but non adoption of standards tend to lead to unclarity of intention, mistaken interpretations which then leads to costs creep, gold plating and scope.

== Costs and benefits ==
- Standardized Industrial design
- Consistent approach.
- Suppliers know what they deliver
- Easier to insure.

== CASE 1: OLF 70 - Effectiveness through standardisation ==
OLF 70 is one of several joint industry project between oil industry operators and the various suppliers of services and equipment in the industry.

OLF, the Norwegian Oil Industry Association, is a professional body and employer's association for oil and supplier companies (engaged in the field of exploration and production of oil and gas) on the Norwegian continental shelf. OLF is a member of the Confederation of Norwegian Business and Industry. OLF participates in the petroleum industry, as an advocate in matters that concern the entire sector.

== CASE 2:Professional Petroleum Data Management Association (PPDM) ==
The PPDM Association is a global, not-for-profit organization that develops data management standards for the petroleum industry. See Professional Petroleum Data Management Association

== See also ==
- History of the petroleum industry in Norway
