= Continuous Drilling Provision =

A Continuous Drilling Provision or "Continuous Operations Provision" is a legal contract clause commonly found in oil and gas leases in the petroleum industry.

== Definition ==
Generally, a continuous drilling provision allows a temporary cessation of production without automatically resulting in the termination of an oil and gas lease that has been extended by production. In order to qualify for the temporary cessation, certain operations (as defined in the lease or by case law) must be commenced on the leased premises or lands pooled or unitized therewith within a specified time period (typically from 30 to 120 days).

=== For example ===
"Notwithstanding the provisions of this lease to the contrary, this lease shall terminate at the end of the primary term or any extension thereof as to all of the leased land except those lands within any Governmental Section in which is located a well producing or capable of producing oil and/or gas or on which lessee is engaged in drilling or reworking operations. This lease shall not terminate so long as drilling or reworking operations are being continuously prosecuted if not more than 180 days shall lapse between the completion or abandonment of one well and the beginning of operations for the drilling of another well."

== Purpose ==
The continuous drilling provision was created in order to provide more certainty in the face of inconsistent court rulings. While a continuous drilling provision may provide the parties with a more reliable test to determine whether drilling and operations have been continuously prosecuted (so as to hold a lease past its primary term), the inclusion of the provision could prove fatal to a lease that is held by production.
