= Desalter =

Part of oil refinery that removes salt from the crude oil

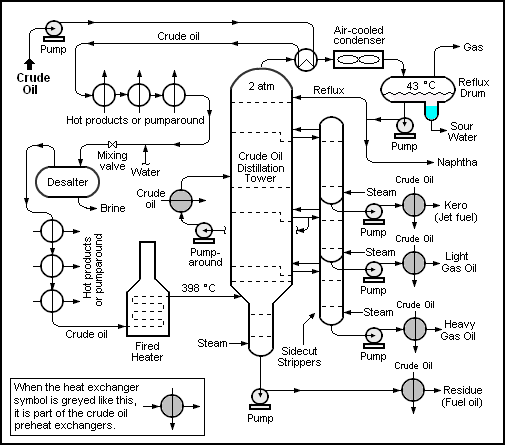
Schematic flow diagram of a typical crude oil distillation unit as used in petroleum crude oil refineries.

A desalter is a process unit in an oil refinery that removes salt from the crude oil. The salt is dissolved in the water in the crude oil, not in the crude oil itself. The desalting is usually the first process in crude oil refining. The salt content after the desalter is usually measured in PTB – pounds of salt per thousand barrels of crude oil. Another specification is Basic sediment and water.

The term desalter may also refer to a water desalination facility used to treat brackish water from agricultural runoff. This may be done either to produce potable water for human or animal consumption, or to reduce the salinity of river water prior to its crossing an international border, usually to comply with the terms of a treaty. Desalters are also used to treat groundwater reservoirs in areas impacted by cattle feedlots and dairies.

== Desalting crude oil ==
The salts that are most frequently present in crude oil are calcium, sodium and magnesium chlorides. If these compounds are not removed from the oil several problems arise in the refining process. The high temperatures that occur downstream in the process could cause water hydrolysis, which in turn allows the formation of corrosive hydrochloric acid. Sand, silts and salt cause deposits and foul heat exchangers or result in plugging. The need to supply heat to vaporize water reduces crude pre-heat capacity. Sodium, arsenic and other metals can poison catalysts. By removing the suspended solids, they are not carried into the burner and eventually flue gas, where they would cause problems with environmental compliance such as flue gas opacity norms.

Crude oil to be desalted is heated to a temperature of 100-150 °C and mixed with 4-10% fresh water, which dilutes the salt. Electric desalination and dehydration units (ELOU) combine desalination with removal of water from the crude. The mixture is then pumped into a settling tank where the salt water separates from the oil and is drawn off. An electrostatic field set up by the desalter transformer is applied by electrodes in the settling tank, inducing polarization of the water droplets floating in the larger volume of oil. This results in the water droplets clumping together and settling to the bottom of the tank.

== See also ==
- Brackish water
- Water desalination
