= Oil production plant =

Facility which processes production fluids from oil wells

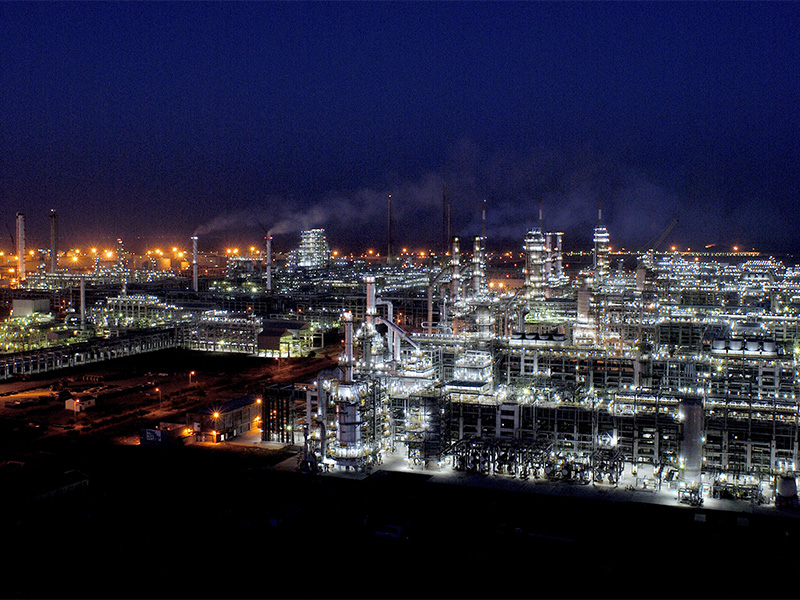
Photograph of the Jamnagar Refinery in India.

An oil production plant is a facility which processes production fluids from oil wells in order to separate out key components and prepare them for export. Typical oil well production fluids are a mixture of oil, gas and produced water. An oil production plant is distinct from an oil depot, which does not have processing facilities.

Oil production plant may be associated with onshore or offshore oil fields.

Many permanent offshore installations have full oil production facilities. Smaller platforms and subsea wells export production fluids to the nearest production facility, which may be on a nearby offshore processing installation or an onshore terminal. The produced oil may sometimes be stabilised (a form of distillation) which reduces vapour pressure and sweetens "sour" crude oil by removing hydrogen sulphide, thereby making the crude oil suitable for storage and transport. Offshore installations deliver oil and gas to onshore terminals which may further process the fluids prior to sale or delivery to oil refineries.

== Onshore oil production ==
The configuration of onshore oil production facilities depends on the size of the oil field. For simple fields comprising a single well or a few wells, an oil storage tank may be sufficient. The tank is emptied periodically by road tanker and transferred to an oil refinery. For larger production rates a rail tanker transfer facility may be appropriate. For larger fields a full three-phase processing facility is required. Three-phase separators separate the well fluids into its three constituent phases: oil, gas and produced water. Oil may be transferred by road or rail tanker or by pipeline to an oil refinery. Gas may be used on the site to run gas engines to produce electricity or can be piped to local users. Excess gas is burned in a ground flare. Produced water may be re-injected into the reservoir. Small fields can use portable integrated packages, like vapor-tight tanks.

See for example: Wytch Farm

== Offshore oil processing options ==
There is a wide variety of options for the processing of produced oil. These range from minimal offshore processing with all produced fluids sent to an onshore facility, to full offshore processing to make products to a specification suitable for sale or use with no further onshore processing. The decision on what facilities to provide depends on a number of factors:

- the optimal size of the offshore installation
- whether an onshore terminal is required or available
- what export routes (pipelines, tankers) are available
- the project constraints in terms of cost, schedule, and resources
- the impact or implications for future projects

The Gulf of Mexico and the North Sea are two mature producing areas that have taken different approaches to the facilities provided. These are summarised in the following table:

Offshore oil installation characteristic – Gulf of Mexico and North Sea
Parameter	Gulf of Mexico continental shelf	Gulf of Mexico deepwater	North Sea
Oil processing
Oil production, barrels oil per day (BOPD)	< 20,000 (<3,180 m^{3}/day)	50,000 – 250,000 (7,949 – 39,746 m^{3}/day)	50,000 – 250,000 (7,949 – 39,746 m^{3}/day)
Individual well flow rate, BOPD (m^{3}/day)	< 3,000 (<477 m^{3}/day)	10,000 – 35,000 (1,590 – 5,564 m^{3}/day)	10,000 – 25,000 (1,590 – 3,975 m^{3}/day)
Wellhead temperature °F (°C)	90 – 110 (32 – 43 °C)	110 – 200 (43 – 93 °C)	150 – 230 (65 – 110 °C)
Separation train(s)	1	1–2	1 – 2
Separation stage(s)	4 – 5	3 – 5	1 – 3
Export oil water content, % by volume	< 1	< 1	< 2
Export oil Reid Vapor pressure, psi	< 11	< 11	< 150 (true vapor pressure)
Export oil pressure, psi (bar)	1,000 – 1,500 (69 – 103 bar)	1,500 – 3,000 (103 – 207 bar)	1,500 – 2,800 (103 – 193 bar)
Gas processing
Gas rate, MMSCFD (million standard cubic feet per day)	< 50	50 – 400	50 – 300
Gas compression	Reciprocating compressors	Screw, centrifugal compressors	Centrifugal compressors
Gas dehydration	Tri-ethylene glycol (TEG)	TEG, enhanced regeneration	TEG, enhanced regeneration
Export gas water content, lb/MMSCF	7	2 – 4	2 – 4
Export gas pressure, psi (bar)	1,000 – 1,200 (69 – 93 bar)	1,500 – 3,000 (103 –207 bar)	2,000 – 2,700 (138 – 186 bar)
Support Facilities and utilities
Process heating	Direct fired, hot oil	Hot oil	Hot oil
Process cooling	Air cooled heat exchanger	Air cooled heat exchanger, water cooled heat exchanger	Seawater, TEG/water cooling medium
Produced water treatment	Skim tank, induced gas flotation (IGF)	Hydrocyclones, IGF	Hydrocyclones, degasser
Water injection	Occasional	Frequent	Frequent

=== Export options ===
The export options for oil and gas and the deployment around the world are as follows:

- Stabilised crude oil
  - Reid Vapor Pressure RVP < 11 psi (0.76 bar)
  - Basic Sediment & Water BS&W < 1% by volume)
  - Gulf of Mexico, Canada East Coast, West Africa, Indonesia.
- Unstabilised wet crude
  - True vapour pressure 150 psia (10.3 bara)
  - BS&W 2%
  - North Sea, Azerbaijan, Gulf of Suez, Trinidad.

Gas disposal may take one or more of the following routes:

Gas disposal routes
Disposal route	Gas processing		Location deployment		
Disposal route	Dehydration	Hydrocarbon dewpoint	Gulf of Mexico facilities	North Sea facilities	Deployed elsewhere
Pipeline	Yes	Yes	Few	Some	Indonesia
Pipeline	Yes	No	Most	Most	Most areas
Pipeline	No	No	Few	Few	Gulf of Suez, Trinidad
Gas reinjection	Yes	Yes	Few	Some	Canada East Coast, West Africa
Flaring	No	No	Few	Few	Several isolated fields and FPSO production

In the Central and Northern North Sea gas is delivered to St Fergus or Teesside terminals by a small number of large diameter (36 inch, 91.4 cm) gas pipelines. These operate at 1600 – 2500 psig (110 – 172 bar) in the dense phase i.e. above the critical pressure. Operation in the dense phase provides a number of advantages:

- it is more efficient to transport gas at high pressure over long distances
- it eliminates the problem of multiphase flow
- it eliminates the need to treat gas by hydrocarbon dewpointing

These advantages are offset by the additional compression required and thicker walled, more expensive, pipelines are necessary.

=== Plant configuration ===
A further consideration is the number of separation trains and the number of stages of separation. Trains of process facilities operate in parallel, and stages are operated in a sequential series. The number of trains depends on flowrates, the availability of plant, and the available plot area. Single trains are capable of handling 150,000 to 200,000 barrels of oil per day (23,847 – 31,797 m^{3}/day). Vessel sizes can be up to 14 to 19 feet (4.3 to 5.8 m) diameter and up to 30 feet (9.1 m) long. Vessels on Gulf of Mexico deepwater installations are 12 to 14 feet (3.7 to 4.3 m) diameter and 60 to 70 feet (18 to 21 m) long.

The number of stages of separation depends on:

- wellhead pressure
- the gas/oil ratio
- the vapor pressure specification of the crude oil export stream

First stage separators in the Gulf of Mexico typically operate at 1500 to 1800 psi (103.4 to 124.1 bar), they operate as 2-phase liquid and vapour separators with a liquid residence time of 1 to 2 minutes. Produced water is removed in the low pressure (LP) 3-phase separator. This operates at 150 –250 psi (10.3 – 17.2 bar).

In the North Sea first stage separators generally operate at < 750 psi (< 51.72 bar). These are operated as 3-phase (vapour, oil and water) separators and are sized to provide 3 – 5 minutes of liquid residence time. Pressures are set to maximise gas separation at as a high a pressure as possible. Up to 5 stages of separation are common in the Gulf of Mexico and up to 4 stages on platforms in the North Sea.

The throughput, number of trains, separation stages and first stage separator pressure for a range of historic offshore installations is shown in the table.

Processing plant on offshore installations
Installation	Location	°API Gravity	Oil production, BOPD	Gas production, m^{3}/day	Inlet separator pressure, bar	No. of trains	No. of stages
Brent C	North Sea	38	150,000	8,500,000	9.6	3	4
Claymore A	North Sea	30	180,000		5.9	1	3
Cormorant A	North Sea	35	60,000	900,000	30	1	3
Statfjord A	North Sea	38	300,000	8,500,000	69	2	4
Murchison	North Sea	36	164,000	1,300,000	45	1	3
Buchan	North Sea	33.5	70,000	600,000	10	1	3
Magnus	North Sea	39	140,000	2,500,000	28	2	2
Brae A	North Sea	33/35, 41/45, 33	100,000 + 12,000 NGL	4,250,000	248	2	3
Namorado I	South America		40,000	640,000		2	3
Namorado II	South America		60,000	420,000			
Cherne I	South America		50,000	120,000		1	
Bayan A	South China Sea		60,000		27	2	2
Brae B	North Sea	33/35, 41/45, 33	75,000	11,300,000	103	1	4
Ship Shoal	Gulf of Mexico		12,000	4,250	90	1	3
Forties Echo	North Sea	37	67,000	300,000			
Eider	North Sea	34	53,000		14 – 29.3	1	1
Seillean (Cyrus)	North Sea	36	15,000	6,000,000	17	1	2
East Brae	North Sea	33/35, 41/45, 33	120,000	17,000,000	102	1	3
Gannet	North Sea	38/43	56,000	4,000,000	18 – 70	4	1
Nelson	North Sea	40	145,000		9	1	
Tiffany	North Sea	33.6	105,000	3,250,000	17	1	2

=== Materials of construction ===
A range of materials of construction are used for oil processing plant. Carbon steel is extensively used as it is inexpensive. However, it is unsuitable for corrosive service where a number of corrosion resistant alloys and other materials are required. The table illustrates typical materials for service on a plant that processes sour fluids.

System or plant	Material of construction
Flowlines and manifolds (sweet service)	Carbon steel
Flowlines and manifolds (sour service)	Alloy 825
Flowlines and manifolds (high H_{2}S)	Duplex
Separators (sweet)	Carbon steel
Separators (sour)	Carbon steel clad with Alloy 825
Condensate separators	Carbon steel
Condensate separators (sour high pressure)	Carbon steel clad with 316 stainless steel
Condensate separators (sour low pressure)	316 stainless steel
Oil pumping and export	Carbon steel
Gas compression	Carbon steel
Gas compression piping (sour)	316 stainless steel
Gas compression vessels (sour)	Carbon steel
Dehydrated gas	Carbon steel
Gas export	Carbon steel
Flare and vent	Carbon steel
Flare (sour or cold service)	316 stainless steel
Gas injection	Carbon steel
Seawater	GRP
Seawater	Cunifer
Firewater	Galvanised steel
Seawater for heat exchangers	Titanium
Injection water	Carbon steel
Drains	Carbon steel
Fresh water	Copper
Air	Carbon steel
Cooling and heating media	Carbon steel
Fuel gas	Carbon steel

== Process description ==
=== The oil train ===
The production plant can be considered to begin after the production wing valve on the oil well Christmas tree. The reservoir fluids from each well are piped through a flowline to a choke valve, which regulates the rate of flow and reduces the pressure of the fluids. The flowlines from each well are gathered together at one or more inlet manifolds. These are provided for each train or operate at different pressures to match the wellhead pressure with various separator pressures. High pressure manifolds are routed into a first stage separator, which separates the three fluid phases. Produced water, the densest phase, settles out at the bottom of the separator, oil floats on the top of the produced water phase, and gas occupies the upper part of the separator. The separator is sized to provide a liquid residence time of 3 to 5 minutes which is sufficient for light crude oil (>35° API) as produced in the North Sea. In the Gulf of Mexico the first stage separator operates as a 2-phase (gas and liquid) vessel, it is sized to provide a liquid residence time of 1 to 2 minutes.

Sand and other solids from the reservoir will tend to settle out in the bottom of the separators. If allowed to accumulate the solids reduce the volume available for oil/gas/water separation reducing efficiency. The vessel may be taken offline and drained down and the solids removed by digging out by hand. Or water sparge pipes in the base of the separator used to fluidize the sand which can be drained from the drain valves in the base.

Two stage oil separation train

Oil from the first stage separator may be cooled or heated in a heat exchanger to aid further separation. North Sea fields tend to operate at higher temperatures so heating may not be required. Gulf of Mexico fields tend to operate at lower temperatures so heat is required to achieve export vapor and BS&W specifications. Typical operating temperatures are 140–160 °F (60–71 °C).

Oil is then routed either to a second stage separator, operating at a lower pressure than the first stage to further separate oil/gas/water, or to a coalescer to further remove water. Several stages of separation, operating at successively lower pressures, aim to reduce the amount of dissolved gas and hence reduces the flash point of the oil to meet the export oil specification. For higher oil flowrates parallel trains of separators may be necessary to handle the flow and to provide a turn-down capability. The final stage of separation may be an electrostatic coalescer. These can achieve a 0.5% by volume water content, typical design fluxes are in the order of 200 bopd/ft^{2}.

A test separator (see diagram) enables the performance of individual wells to be determined. An individual well is connected to the test header which routes fluids to the test separator. Three phase separation into oil, vapour and produced water takes place. The flowrates of these phases are accurately measured as the fluids flow to lower pressure points in the oil train. The flowrates determine the performance of the well in terms of the maximum flow of the well, the gas-oil ratio, and the water cut of the fluids.

Some oil fields are sour, with high levels of carbon dioxide (CO_{2}) and hydrogen sulphide (H_{2}S). Operation of separation at high temperature drives these gases to the vapour phase. However, crude may still contain sour compounds above a typical H_{2}S-in-crude specification limit of < 10 ppmw. A trayed column is used with sour crude fed in the top of the column and stripping gas introduced into the bottom of the column.

From the final stage of separation, or from the coaleser, oil may be cooled to meet export specifications or to limit thermal stresses on the oil export riser. Oil is metered to accurately measure the flowrate and then pumped via a pipeline to the onshore terminal. Some installations such as concrete gravity-base structures and floating production storage and offloading, FPSOs, have integral oil storage tanks which are continuously filled with oil and periodically discharged into oil tankers.

=== Produced water ===
Produced water from the separator(s) and coalescer is routed to a produced water degasser operating at near atmospheric pressure to remove dissolved gas from the water. In the early days of the offshore industry parallel plate separator units were used to clean produced water prior to overboard disposal. Hydrocyclones, which are more compact, were introduced in the 1980s. A hydrocyclone removes entrained oil and solids from produced water which then passes to the degasser and can then either be re-injected into the reservoir or dumped overboard. Induced gas flotation plant is used when the hydrocyclone / degasser plant cannot achieve the oil-in-water specification. For overboard disposal the water should have an oil content of less than about 30 parts per million (ppm) oil-in-water. On North Sea installations the higher operating temperatures allow an oil-in-water concentration of > 20 ppmw to be achieved.

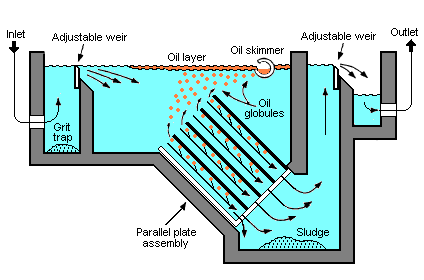
Parallel plate separator

=== The gas train ===
The associated gas from the top of the separator(s) is also known as flash gas or wet gas as it is saturated with water and liquid hydrocarbons. The gas is typically routed through scrubbers, compressors and coolers to raise the pressure of the gas and to remove liquids. Scrubbers are vertical vessels that allow the removal and separation of liquids from a gas stream. Coolers are located after a compressor to remove the heat of compression. Centrifugal compressors are often used offshore. They are more compact and lighter than reciprocating machines and maintenance costs are less. The latter are used where only small volumes of gas are handled. Centrifugal compressors may be driven by gas turbines or electric motors.

The dry gas may be exported, used for gas lift, flared, used as fuel for the installation's power generators, or after further compression re-injected into the reservoir. Export gas is metered to accurately measure the flowrate before being sent to the onshore terminal via gas pipeline. Other treatment processes may be required.

==== Gas dehydration ====
Gas may be dried to reduce the water content to meet sales specification, to prevent condensation of water in the pipeline and the formation of slugs, or to avoid the formation of hydrates in the export pipeline. Gas is dried by counter-current contact with triethylene glycol in a glycol dehydration tower. Typically dried gas has a water content of 2.5 to 7 lb of water /MMSCF. Glycol contactors generally operate at 1100–1200 psi (75 to 83 bar). Water-rich glycol is regenerated by heating and stripping off the water. Enhanced regeneration uses DRIZO or Coldfinger to improve the regeneration performance. Contactor towers formerly comprised bubble cap trays, since the 1980s structured packing has been used which provides the equivalent of 3 to 4 theoretical trays required to meet a water content of <4 lb/MMSCF.

==== Hydrocarbon dewpointing ====
The export hydrocarbon dew-point specification (typically 100 barg at 5 °C) may be met by chilling the gas to remove the higher alkanes (butane, pentanes, etc.). This may be done by a refrigeration system, or passing the gas through a Joule-Thomson valve, or through a turbo-expander to condense out and separate liquids. The natural gas liquids (NGL) produced may be spiked into the oil export fluids where high vapor pressure fluids are exported. Alternatively NGL fractionating columns may be used to produce a fluid for separate export. NGL fractionation columns are installed in Nkossa West Africa and Ardjuna Indonesia.

==== Gas sweetening ====
Dry gas may be further treated to meet export gas specifications. Excess carbon dioxide (CO_{2}) can be removed by treatment in an amine gas treating process (e.g. Selexol), whereby CO_{2} is preferentially dissolved in a counter-current flow of amine in a contact tower. Hydrogen sulphide can also be removed using amine or by passing the gas through beds of zinc oxide absorbent.

== Onshore terminals ==
Onshore oil terminals receive oil from offshore installations and treat it to produce products for sale or further processing such as in an oil refinery. Onshore terminals generally have fired heaters followed by separators and coalescers to stabilise the crude and remove any produced water and light hydrocarbons not separated offshore. Onshore separators tend to operate at a lower pressure than the offshore separators and so more gas is evolved. The associated gas is generally compressed, dew-pointed and exported via a dedicated pipeline. If gas export is uneconomical then it may be flared. Onshore terminals frequently have large crude oil storage tanks to allow offshore production to continue if the export route becomes unavailable. Export to the oil refinery is either by pipeline or tanker.

Onshore gas terminals may have facilities for removal of liquids from the incoming gas stream. Gas treatment processes may include glycol dehydration, gas sweetening, hydrocarbon dew-point control and gas compression before gas distribution to users.

== Utility and support systems ==
In addition to production and gas and oil treatment systems a range of ancillary, support and utility systems are provided to support production and occupation of an offshore installation. Systems include:

- Glycol regeneration - water-rich glycol is heated and stripped with dry gas to drive off the water
- Amine regeneration - rich amine is heated and stripped with sweet gas to drive off CO_{2} and H_{2}S
- Fuel gas - used to power gas turbines, and to purge relief, vent and flare systems
- Purge gas - to provide blanket gas for tanks and to purge vessels prior to maintenance
- Inert gas - to provide blanket gas for tanks and to purge vessels prior to maintenance
- Diesel fuel - for firewater pump diesel engines and start-up of generators
- Aviation fuel - Jet A-1 for helicopter refuelling
- Atmospheric vent - gas disposal for low pressure systems and maintenance purging
- Relief and Flares - safe collection and disposal of excess gas under normal and shutdown conditions
- Pipeline pigging - to clear and monitor pipelines
- Well test facilities - test separator to determine flowrates from individual wells
- Seawater - used for flushing, cooling, washdown
- Firewater - seawater for fire fighting
- Water injection - deaerated seawater injected into the oil reservoir to drive oil towards production wells and maintain reservoir pressure
- Potable water - drinking water bunkered from supply vessels or made on board by distillation or reverse osmosis of seawater
- Cooling medium - to cool gas and oil streams; comprising either seawater (direct) cooling or a fresh water/glycol mixture (see below)
- Heating medium - to heat gas and oil streams, HVAC; comprising hot oil or a fresh water/glycol mixture (see below)
- Closed (process) drains - to drain process equipment prior to maintenance
- Open drains - drainage from deck areas, hazardous area drains are segregated from non-hazardous area drains, disposed overboard
- Sewage treatment - maceration and overboard disposal of 'black' (toilet) and 'grey' (sink and shower) water
- Plant/service air - for powering air-driven tools, purging vessels
- Instrument air - for operating pneumatic actuated controllers and valves
- Electricity generation - diesel or fuel gas for diesel engine or gas turbine driven electricity generation
- Chemical storage and injection - to aid separation of well fluids and maintain operation of facilities, may include methanol, glycol, corrosion inhibitor, scale inhibitor, oxygen scavenger, H_{2}S scavenger, emulsion breaker, foam breaker, wax inhibitor
- Seal oil and lube oil storage - for compressors, gas turbines and diesel engines
- Hydraulic oil - operation of subsea and subsurface well equipment
- HVAC - for enclosed process plant and accommodation
- Drilling facilities - bulk chemical storage, well drilling equipment

=== Utilities in detail ===
Heating medium is generally heated by waste heat recovery from power generation gas turbine exhausts. The temperature required is generally not more than 400 °F (204 °C) and mineral oil based fluids are used. Pressurised hot water, steam, and glycol/water mixtures are also used although temperatures are generally limited to < 300 °F (149 °C). On smaller installations electric heating elements may be the most appropriate option for heating fluids.

Process cooling may be performed using air, seawater (known as direct cooling), or cooling medium comprising a 30% glycol (TEG)/water mixture and known as indirect cooling. North Sea installations are generally quite crowded and do not have space for the extensive plot area required for air cooled heat exchangers. Water cooled heat exchangers occupy a relatively small plot area. North Sea installations are often provided with water injection facilities. These require large volumes of seawater to be lifted. The incremental cost of using the seawater for cooling is therefore considerably reduced. Furthermore, the reduced solubility of air in warmed water is an advantage as air has to be stripped out of injection water. The cold North Sea water temperature reduces the size of heat exchangers. Indirect cooling medium cooling is less likely to have corrosion issues than direct seawater cooling which may require more expensive metals such as Copper alloys, Titanium or Inconel. Cooling medium systems have a lower CAPEX. The clean fluid allows printed circuit heat exchangers to be used which offer space and weight savings.

== See also ==
- Petroleum
- Oil platform
- Oil industry
- Upstream (oil industry)
- Chemical plant
- Oil refinery
- ISO/TC 67
