= Ingrid Eftedal =

Norwegian molecular biologist and barophysiologist

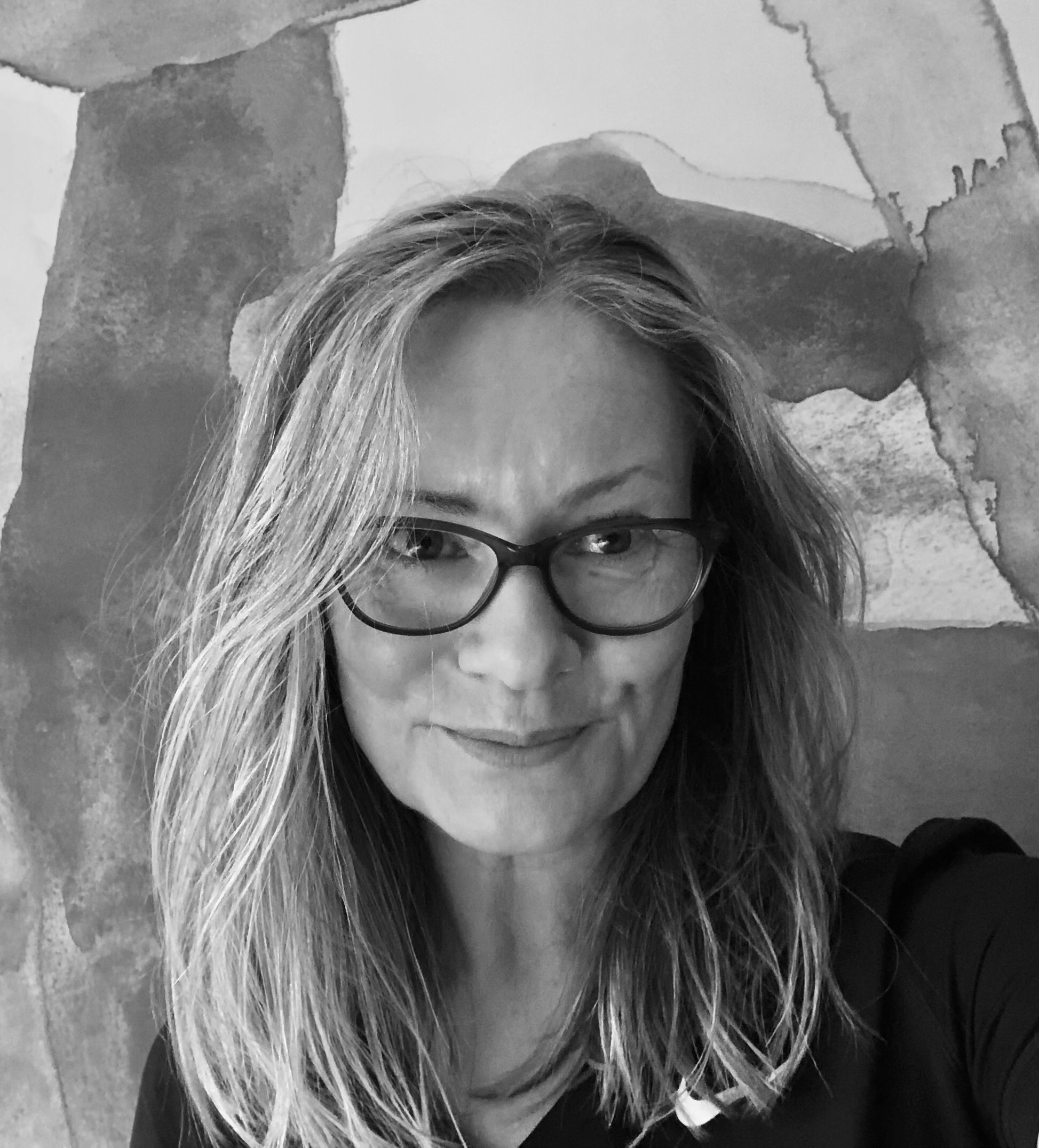
- Born: 3 July 1965 (age 61)
- Education: Norwegian Institute of Technology
- Scientific career
- Fields: Molecular biology, barophysiology
- Workplaces: Norwegian University of Science and Technology
- Thesis: Heterogeneity in the incorporation and excision of uracil in DNA (1993)

Ingrid Eftedal (born 3 July 1965) is a Norwegian molecular biologist and barophysiologist who is employed at the Faculty of Medicine and Health Sciences at the Norwegian University of Science and Technology (NTNU). At NTNU, she has been a senior researcher and head of the barophysiology research group. She has also been a dean and associate professor at the Faculty of Nursing and Health Sciences at Nord University. Eftedal holds a PhD in molecular genetics.

== Career and research ==
She graduated as a civil engineer in biophysics and medical technology from the Norwegian Institute of Technology (NTH; now NTNU) in 1989 and received her doctoral degree (dr.ing.) molecular genetics from NTH in 1993. She was a postdoctoral fellow at the École supérieure de biotechnologie Strasbourg and has worked as a molecular biologist at Rigshospitalet in Copenhagen, as head of the Department of Medical Genetics at St. Olav's University Hospital, and as dean of research at the Faculty of Nursing and Health Sciences at Nord University.

She is employed at the Faculty of Medicine and Health Sciences at NTNU, where she has been a senior researcher and group leader. She has also held a position as an associate professor at Nord University. She was a member of the national Forensic Medical Commission from 2007 to 2012, appointed by the Ministry of Health and Care Services. She was also a member of the Preimplantation Diagnostics Committee from 2008 to 2010.

Eftedal's research studies how the human body adapts to extreme environments using evolutionarily developed mechanisms, and how diving sickness affects immune cells and inflammatory processes. The goal of the research is to contribute research-based knowledge that can prevent health damage to divers and others who are in physically challenging environments. A large part of the research is related to offshore diving. This form of diving has been crucial to Norway's oil and gas industry and is also important for the development of several renewable energy sources, such as wind and wave power.

In 2022, Ingrid Eftedal was one of the finalists for "Name of the Year in Academia" award of the newspaper Khrono.

== Literature ==
- A dive into barophysiology research: an interview with Ingrid Eftedal. Commun Biol 8, 939 (2025). https://doi.org/10.1038/s42003-025-08279-2.
