= Thomas Eftedal =

Norwegian footballer (born 1978)

Personal information
- Date of birth: 5 May 1978 (age 48)
- Height: 1.83 m (6 ft 0 in)
- Position: Right back

Youth career
- Flint

Senior career*
Years	Team	Apps	(Gls)
1994–1997	Flint		
1998–2000	Eik-Tønsberg	67	(6)
2001–2007	Sandefjord	99	(5)
2007	→ Hønefoss (loan)	10	(4)
2008–2010	FK Tønsberg		
- * Club domestic league appearances and goals

Thomas Eftedal (born 5 May 1978) is a Norwegian former footballer who played as a right back. Mostly spending his career in Vestfold clubs, he reached Eliteserien with Sandefjord.

== Career ==
He started his youth career in IL Flint. Together with Flint teammate Petter Furuseth Olsen, he was selected for the pre-national team training camp in Porsgrunn, which assessed players for the Norway U15 and U16 national teams. Eftedal had also been a part of the Football Association's "talent group" of 14-year olds.

After several years in Flint, he was set on leaving after the 1997 season. He was among the most sought-after players in Vestfold, being wanted by Eik-Tønsberg, IL Runar, Sandefjord BK and Ørn-Horten. Eftedal chose Eik-Tønsberg, and made his competitive debut in the first round of the 1998 Norwegian Football Cup and his league debut the same week against Lyn.

After the 2000 season, he decided to leave Eik. The team were relegated to the 2001 2. divisjon, and he had a "relegation release clause" in his contract. He first discussed a transfer to IK Start, then went on trials at Sogndal IL. In the end he joined Sandefjord Fotball, where he was a mainstay during the 2001, 2002 and 2003 seasons.

Eventually in Sandefjord, Eftedal was plagued by injury problems. In the summer of 2004, he underwent surgery for Haglund's syndrome, a heel injury. The injury would cause him to adjust his movements, and therefore sustain stress injury to the areas around the heel, for instance the achilles tendon. The club was not satisfied with the players who tried to replace Eftedal on right back, and in December 2004, his contract was prolonged for two more years. From 2005, however, he was sidelined for a year. He made his comeback in May 2006, starting out on Sandefjord's B team in the Third DIvision.

He made his debut in the Eliteserien as a substitute against Brann in May 2007. His first start in Eliteserien came in July 2007 against Lillestrøm, in a winger position. His match was over before the first quarter had passed, when Eftedal injured his knee in a duel. He was not able to win a starting place in Sandefjord, and in the fall of 2007 he was sent on loan to Hønefoss BK. Here, he scored the winning goal against Raufoss, but the next week he botched a back pass against Løv-Ham which contributed to a loss. All in all, the loan was a success, and he also scored in the penultimate match of the season, which helped Hønefoss achieve their goal, to survive in the 2007 1. divisjon.

After the 2007 season, his contract in Sandefjord expired. Eftedal tried orchestrating a transfer abroad, and went on trial at Southend. He played against the Chelsea Reserves. Since his girlfriend studied medicine in Poznań, he also trained with Warta Poznań. The trials turned out to be fruitless; Eftedal had also trained with FK Tønsberg during the post-season, and ended up signing for them. The club was a successor of Eik-Tønsberg through a merger. At the end of 2010, he left FK Tønsberg. It was said that Eftedal returned to IL Flint.

== Playing style ==
Eventually, he was used as a back, mostly right back, with offensive capabilities that made him move into the winger territory. This was helped by good stamina. In his early career, he was criticized for leaving too much defensive room during his offensive raids, and was used as a forward.

He was nicknamed "Effi".
