= Basic sediment and water =

Impurities in crude oil

Bottom sediment and water (BS&W) is both a technical specification of certain impurities in crude oil and the method for measuring it. When extracted from an oil reservoir, the crude oil will contain some amount of water and suspended solids from the reservoir formation. The particulate matter is known as sediment or mud. The water content can vary greatly from field to field. It may be present in large quantities for older fields, or if oil extraction is enhanced using water injection technology. The bulk of the water and sediment is usually separated at the field to minimize the quantity that needs to be transported further. The residual content of these unwanted impurities is measured as BS&W. Oil refineries may either buy crude to a certain BS&W specification or may alternatively have initial crude oil dehydration and desalting process units that reduce the BS&W to acceptable limits, or a combination thereof.

There are several ways to reduce the amount of water and sediment in crude oil. Gravity settling over several days allows water and solids to settle out. Heating crude oil reduces its viscosity aiding further separation of these components. Certain chemicals added to crude oil can act to aid separation. Surfactants help water to separate from the oil. Paraffin thinners allow heavier fractions in the oil to flow more easily. Demulsifiers break down the oil/water emulsions that may have formed and thereby help to separate different elements of the crude oil.

== Testing ==
ASTM method D4007 or API Manual of Petroleum Measurement Standards chapter 10.4 are commonly used to measure BS&W. These methods both consist of mixing equal volumes of solvent and crude oil then centrifuging in order to separate any solids, free water, or suspended particles (the term Bottom comes from the fact that the sediment and water appear at the bottom of the centrifuge tube after being spun/centrifuged during the test procedure).

More precise methods beyond BS&W are available to independently measure water or solids present in a sample of crude oil, such as ASTM D4928 (water) together with ASTM D4807 (sediment).

== BS&W and Free Water in practice ==
All unrefined crude oil has some water entrained within it. During transportation by ship, separation occurs naturally, and water collects at the base of the tank below the oil; this is known as free water (FW).

Sales contracts for crude oil will typically specify the BS&W and FW to ensure the cargo meets quality standards. In one case in 2020, the quality documents required a BS&W of 0.2% and did not provide for any free water. Upon loading a Very Large Crude Carrier (VLCC) in Porto do Acu in Brazil, 4827 barrels of FW were measured. By the time the ship had reached its destination in the Far East, free water had settled and was measured at 8767 barrels. The BS&W parameter was thereby significantly exceeded.

== See also ==
- Crude oil
- Water injection (oil production)
- American Petroleum Institute
- ASTM International

== Sources ==
- "Steam cracking of partially desalted hydrocarbon feedstocks". Archived from the original on 2008-07-25.
