= Anne Myhrvold =

Norwegian civil servant (born 1966)

Anne Næss Myhrvold
- Born: 1966 (age 59–60)
- Education: University of Bergen
- Occupation: Civil servant
- Employer: Norwegian Ocean Industry Authority

Anne Næss Myhrvold (born 1966) is a Norwegian civil servant. From 2013 to 2025 she served as director of the Norwegian Ocean Industry Authority.

== Career ==
Myhrvold graduated as cand.scient. in microbiology from the University of Bergen in 1992. She was assigned to Rogalandsforskning from 1992 to 1998. From 1998 to 2002 she was appointed at the Norwegian Petroleum Directorate, and from 2002 to 2013 she had a tenure in the private sector with BP Norge.

In 2013 she was appointed as ditector of the Petroleum Safety Authority Norway (later renamed the Norwegian Ocean Industry Authority) for a period of six years. in 2019 her engagement was renewed for another six years, until 2025.

In 2025 she was appointed international director of Offshore Norge.
