= Midstream =

Sector of the oil and gas industry

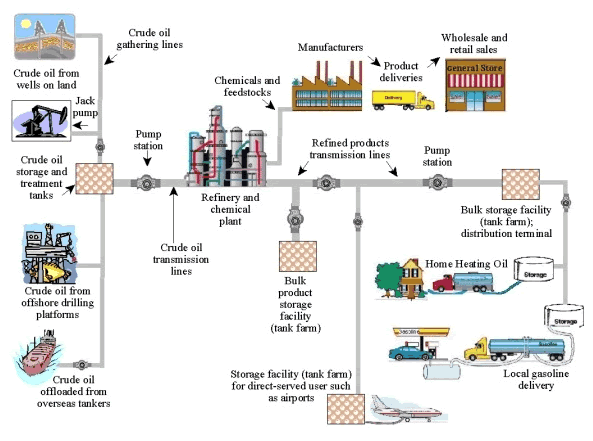
Petroleum Pipeline System An overview of an oil pipeline system from the wellhead to downstream consumers

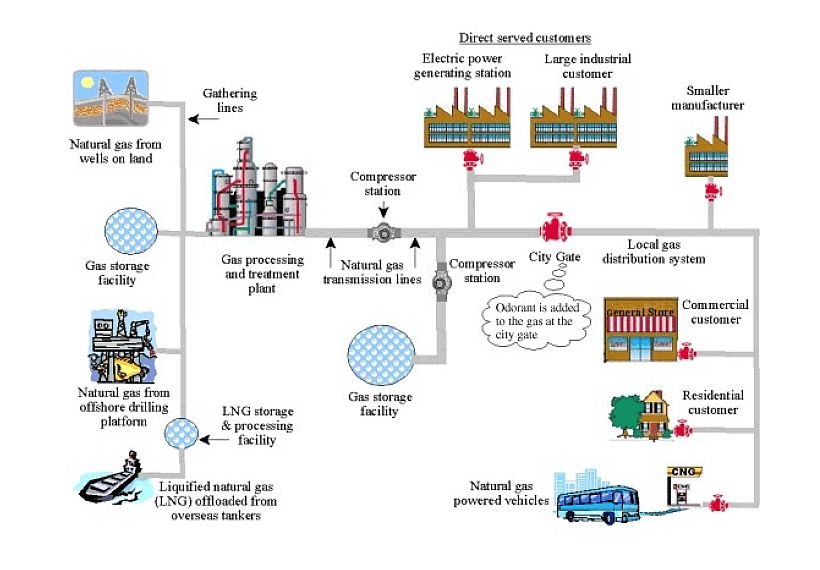
Natural Gas Pipeline System An overview of a natural gas pipeline system from the wellhead to the consumer

Midstream is one of the three major components of the oil and gas industry (together with upstream and downstream) that involves the transportation (by pipeline, rail, barge, oil tanker or truck), storage, and wholesale marketing of crude or refined petroleum products. Pipelines and other transport systems can be used to move crude oil from production sites to refineries and deliver the various refined products to downstream distributors. Natural gas pipeline networks aggregate gas from natural gas purification plants and deliver it to downstream customers, such as local utilities.

Midstream in oil and gas also includes services that help oil and gas producers, such as managing and disposing of wastewater and other oilfield waste.

The midstream operations are often taken to include some elements of the upstream and downstream sectors. For example, the midstream sector may include natural gas processing plants that purify the raw natural gas as well as removing and producing elemental sulfur and natural gas liquids (NGL) as finished end-products.

== Service providers ==
- Barge companies
- Railroad companies
- Trucking and hauling companies
- Pipeline transport companies
- Logistics and technology companies
- Transloading companies
- Terminal developers and operators

== Midstream in ISO standards ==
ISO 20815 defines "midstream" in its definition section as:
3.1.27 midstream
business category involving the processing and transportation sectors of petroleum industry.

Examples: transportation pipelines, terminals, gas processing and treatment, LNG, LPG, and GTL.

== See also ==
- Coal bed methane
- Downstream (petroleum industry)
- Extraction of petroleum
- Gas field
- Hydrocarbon exploration
- Natural gas condensate
- Natural-gas processing
- Petroleum
- Petroleum extraction
- Oil production plant
- Oil refinery
- Oil well
- Upstream (petroleum industry)
