= Downstream (petroleum industry) =

Sector of the oil and gas industry where refining of crude oil and raw natural gas occurs

Downstream is one of the three major components of the oil and gas industry (together with upstream and midstream) that involves refining of crude oil and processing and purifying of raw natural gas to produce petroleum products, as well as the wholesale and retail marketing and distribution of the products.

The downstream sector produces such consumer petrochemicals as fuel (gasoline or petrol, natural gas, liquefied petroleum gas (LPG), kerosene, jet fuel, diesel oil, heating oil and fuel oils), lubricants, waxes, tar and asphalt, as well as naphtha and hundreds of others.

== ISO definition ==
ISO 20815, 3.1.8 downstream, defines downstream as "business process, most commonly in petroleum industry, associated with post-production activities".

Example: refining, transportation and marketing of petroleum products.

== Sulfur ==
Elemental sulfur production as a byproduct of crude oil refining is a part of the downstream sector of the petroleum industry.

Crude oil is a mixture of many varieties of hydrocarbons and most usually have many sulfur-containing compounds. The oil refining process commonly includes hydrodesulfurization which converts most of that sulfur into gaseous hydrogen sulfide. Raw natural gas also may contain gaseous hydrogen sulfide and sulfur-containing mercaptans, which are removed in natural-gas processing plants before the gas is distributed to consumers.

The hydrogen sulfide removed in the refining and processing of crude oil and natural gas is subsequently converted into byproduct elemental sulfur. In 2005, the vast majority of the 64,000,000 tonnes (63,000,000 long tons; 71,000,000 short tons) of sulfur produced worldwide was byproduct sulfur from refineries and natural-gas processing plants.

== See also ==
- Coalbed methane – Form of natural gas extracted from coal beds
- Extraction of petroleum – Removal of petroleum from the earth
- Hydrocarbon exploration – Attempts to locate oil and gas
- Midstream – Sector of the oil and gas industry
- Natural gas – Gaseous fossil fuel
- Natural-gas condensate – Low-density mixture of hydrocarbon liquids
- Natural gas field – Subsurface pool of hydrocarbons
- Natural-gas processing – Industrial processes designed to purify raw natural gas
- Petroleum – Naturally occurring combustible liquid
- Oil production plant – Facility which processes production fluids from oil wells
- Oil refinery – Facility that processes crude oil
- Oil well – Well drilled to extract crude oil and/or gas
- Upstream (petroleum industry) – Sector of the oil and gas industry
