= Petroleum industry =

Extraction and sale of petroleum products

Petroleum industry map showing oil pipelines, natural gas pipelines, refineries, and petroleum fields

The petroleum industry, also known as the oil industry, includes the global processes of exploration, extraction, refining, transportation (often by oil tankers and pipelines), and marketing of petroleum products. The largest volume products of the industry are fuel oil and gasoline (petrol). Petroleum is also the raw material for many chemical products, including pharmaceuticals, solvents, fertilizers, pesticides, synthetic fragrances, and plastics. The industry is usually divided into three major components: upstream, midstream, and downstream. Upstream regards exploration and extraction of crude oil, midstream encompasses transportation and storage of it, and downstream concerns refining crude oil into various end products.

Petroleum is vital to many industries, and is necessary for the maintenance of industrial civilization in its current configuration, making it a critical concern for many nations. Oil accounts for a large percentage of the world's energy consumption, ranging from a low of 32% for Europe and Asia, to a high of 53% for the Middle East.

Other geographic regions' consumption patterns are as follows: South and Central America (44%), Africa (41%), and North America (40%). The world consumes 36 billion barrels (5.8 km^{3}) of oil per year, with developed nations being the largest consumers. The United States consumed 18% of the oil produced in 2015. The production, distribution, refining, and retailing of petroleum taken as a whole represents the world's largest industry in terms of dollar value.

== History ==
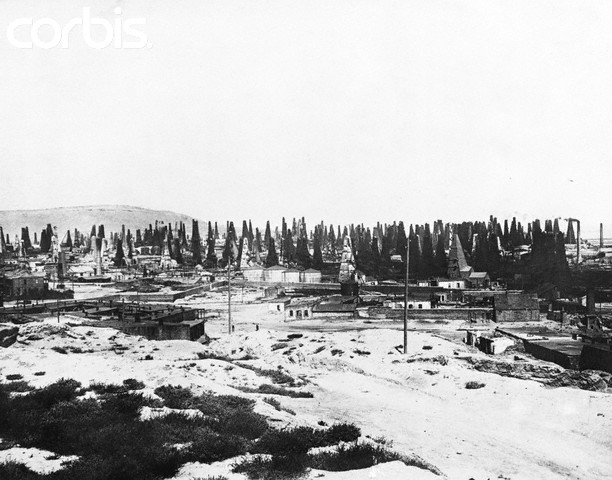
Oil Field in Baku, Azerbaijan, 1926

=== Prehistory ===
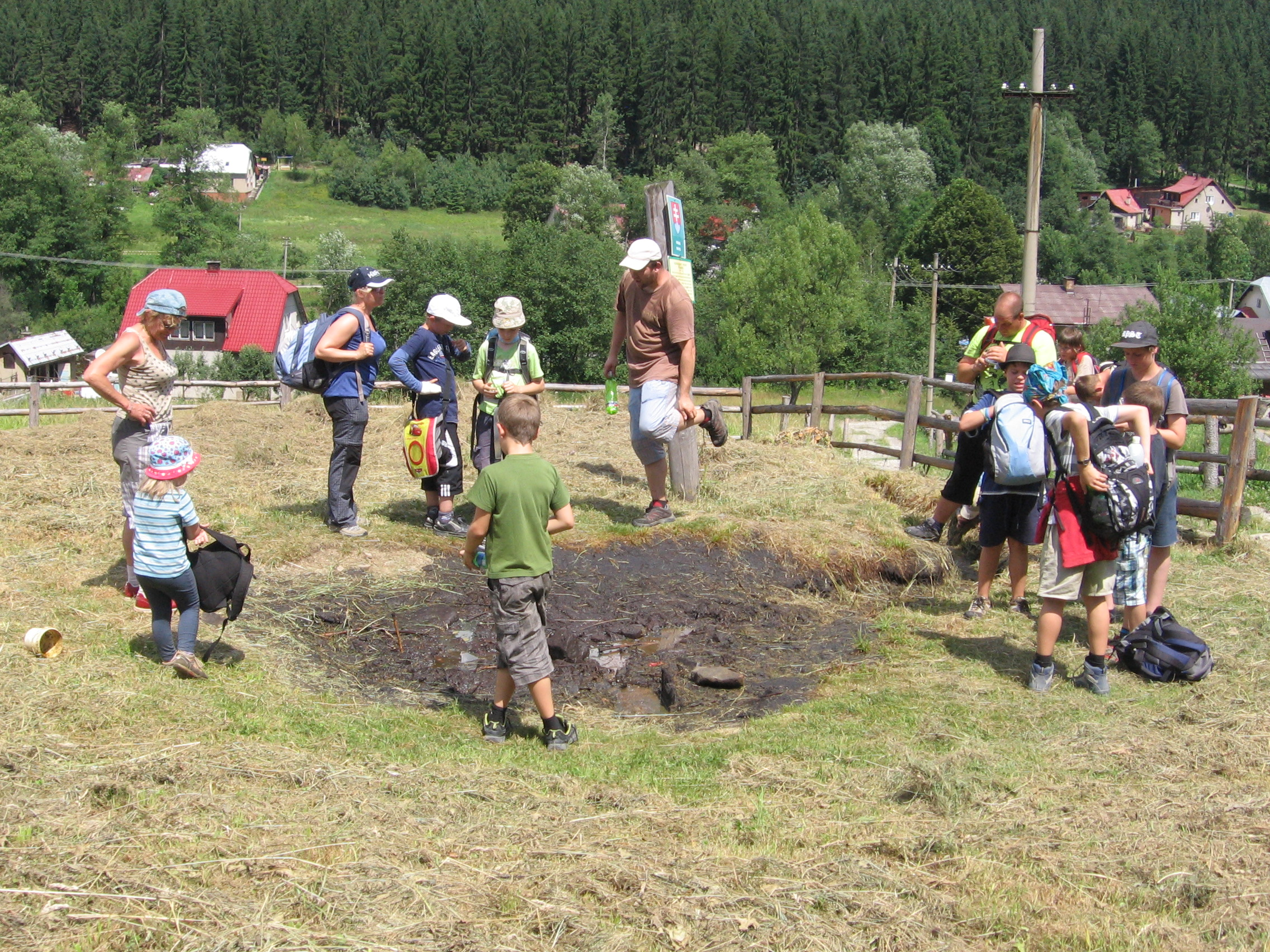
Natural oil spring in Korňa, Slovakia

Petroleum is a naturally occurring liquid found in rock formations. It consists of a complex mixture of hydrocarbons of various molecular weights, plus other organic compounds. It is generally accepted that oil is formed mostly from the carbon rich remains of ancient plankton after exposure to heat and pressure in Earth's crust over hundreds of millions of years. Over time, the decayed residue was covered by layers of mud and silt, sinking further down into Earth's crust and preserved there between hot and pressured layers, gradually transforming into oil reservoirs.

=== Early history ===
Petroleum in an unrefined state has been utilized by humans for over 5000 years. Oil in general has been used since early human history to keep fires ablaze and in warfare.

Its importance to the world economy however, evolved slowly, with whale oil being used for lighting in the 19th century and wood and coal used for heating and cooking well into the 20th century. Even though the Industrial Revolution generated an increasing need for energy, this was initially met mainly by coal, and from other sources including whale oil. However, when it was discovered that kerosene could be extracted from crude oil and used as a lighting and heating fuel, the demand for petroleum increased greatly, and by the early twentieth century had become the most valuable commodity traded on world markets.

=== Modern history ===
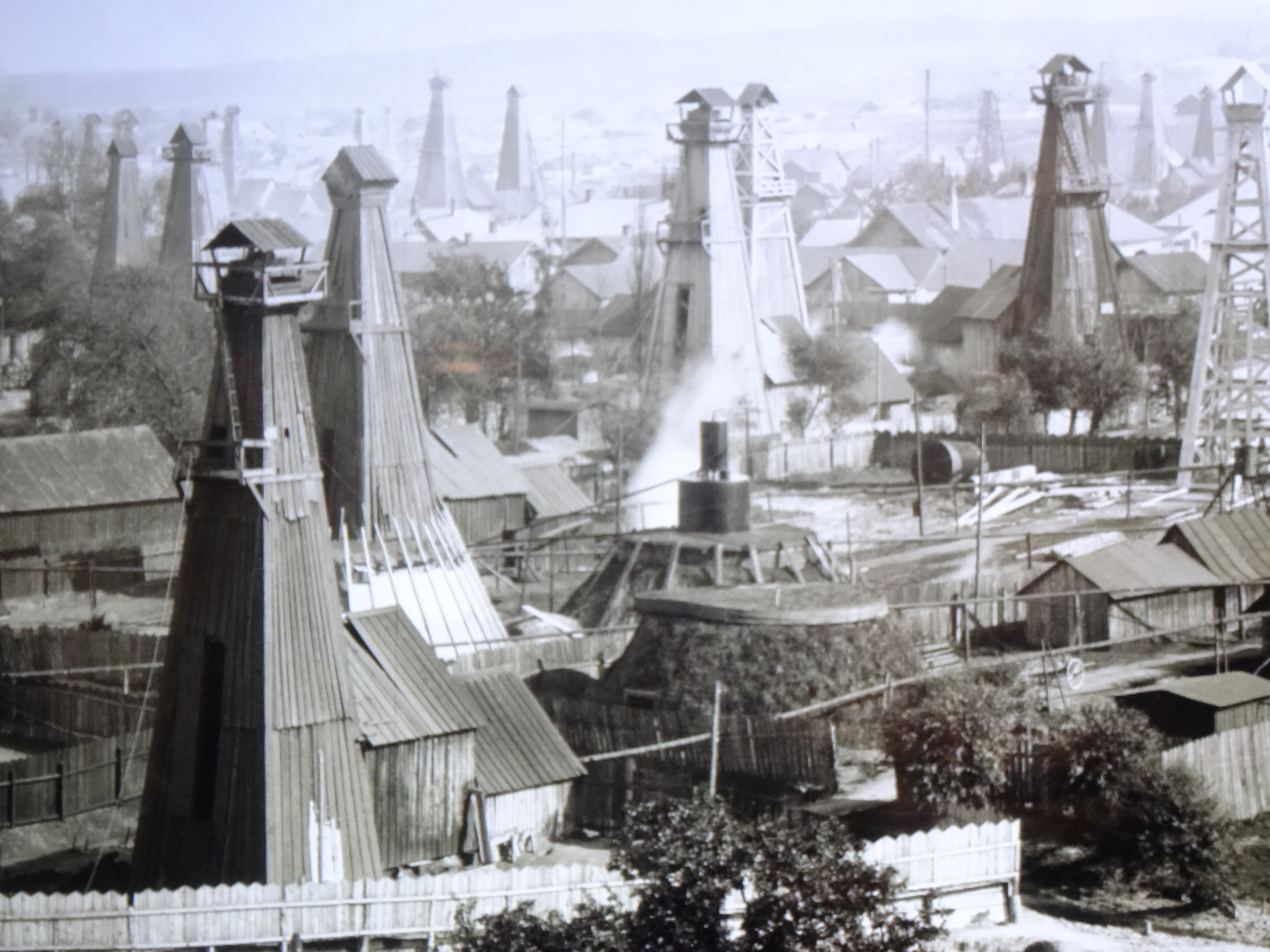
Oil wells in Boryslav

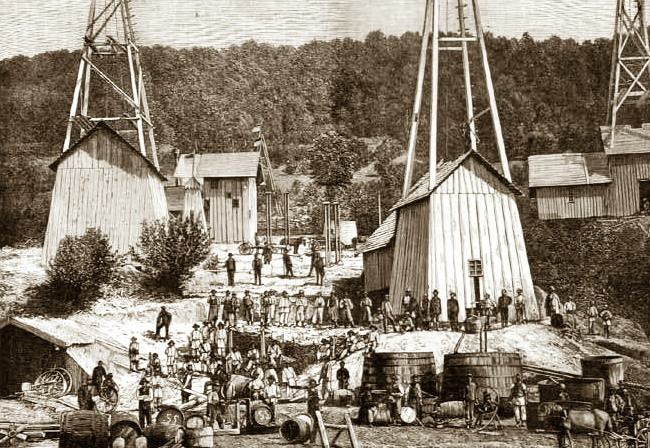
Galician oil wells

Net income of the global oil and gas industry reached a record US$4 trillion in 2022.

After recovering from the COVID-19 pandemic, energy company profits increased with greater revenues from higher fuel prices resulting from the Russian invasion of Ukraine, falling debt levels, tax write-downs of projects shut down in Russia, and backing off from earlier plans to reduce greenhouse gas emissions. Record profits sparked public calls for windfall taxes.

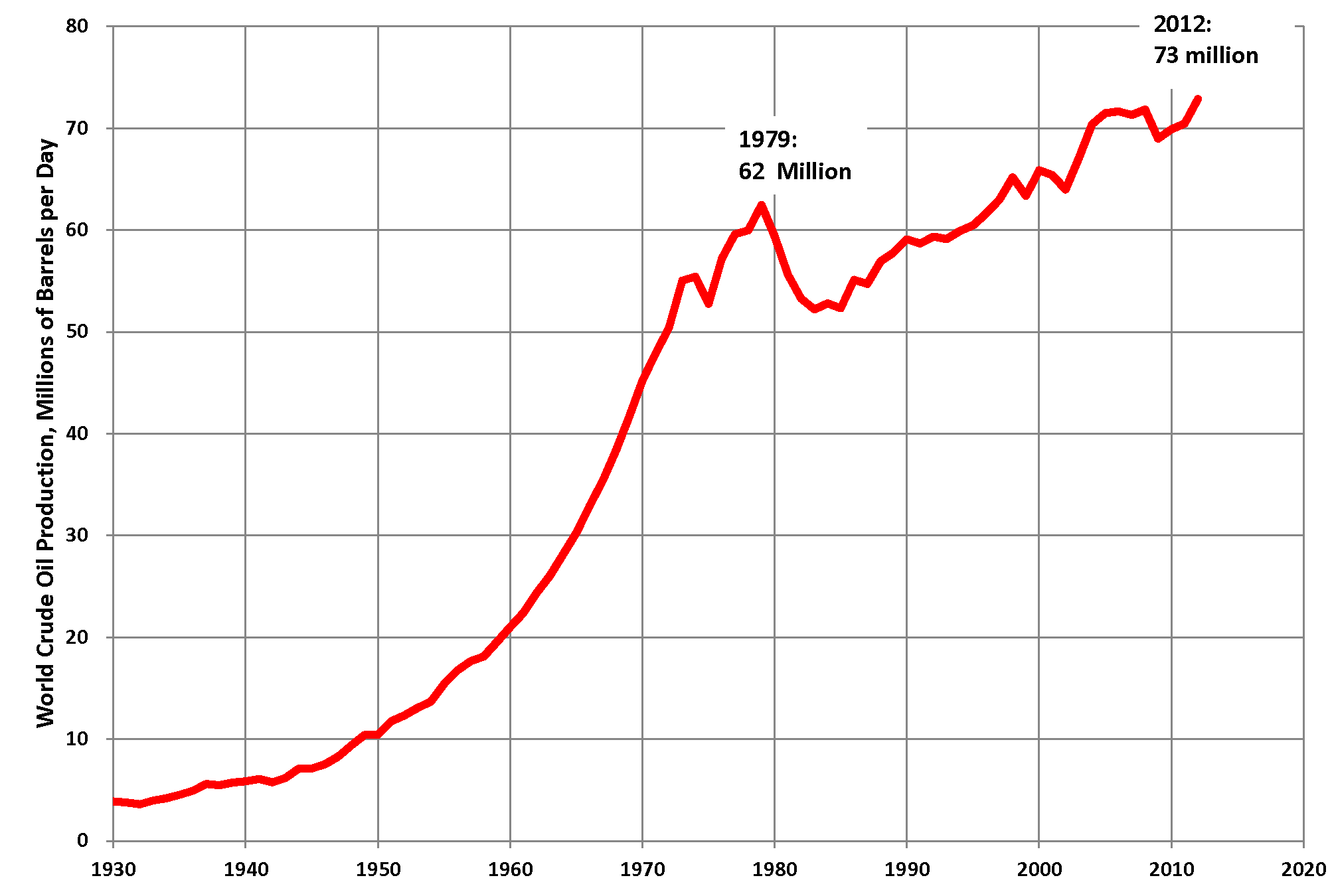
World crude oil production from wells (excludes surface-mined oil, such as from Canadian heavy oil sands), 1930–2012

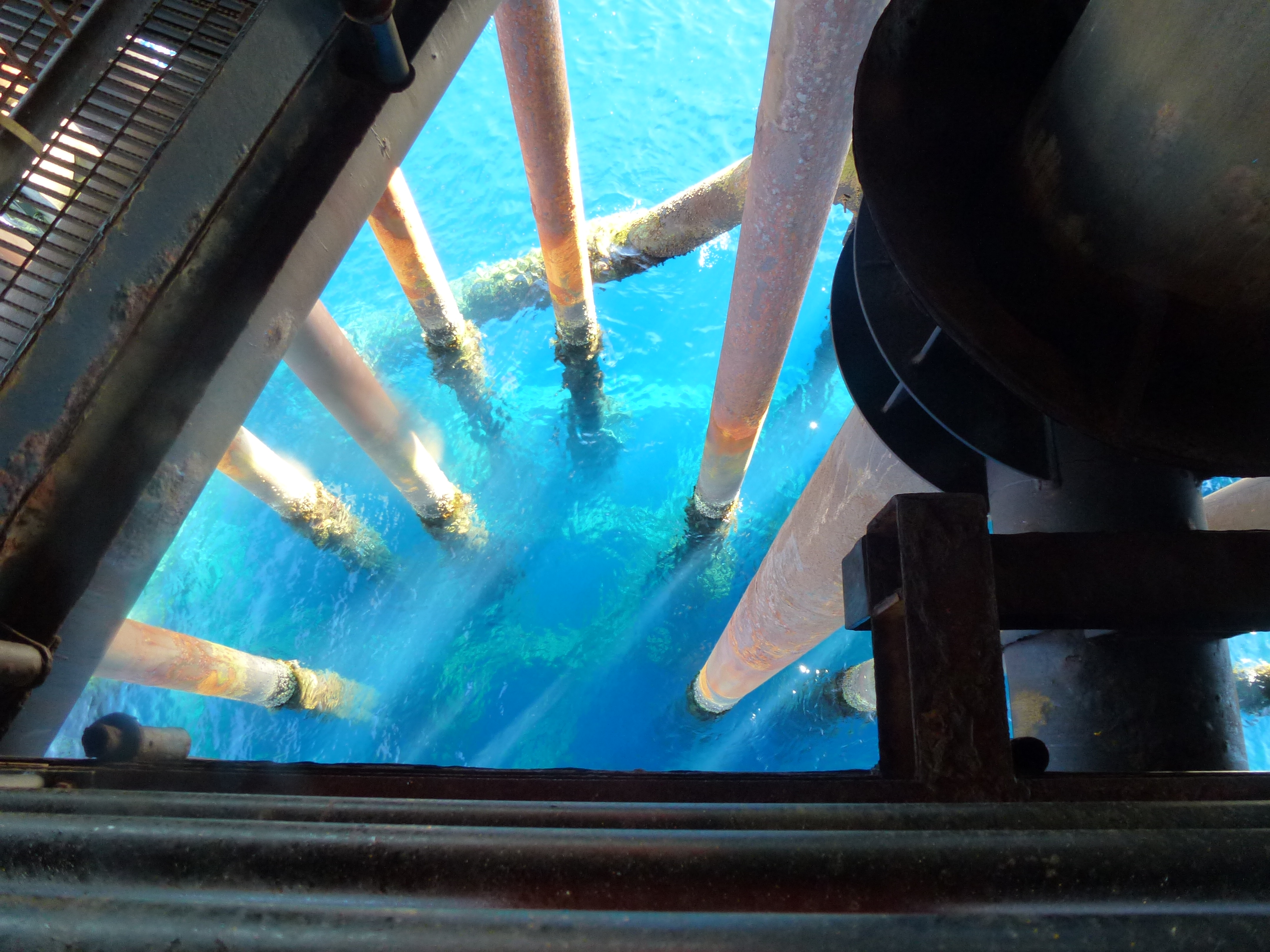
Subsea risers beneath an offshore oil production platform

View source data.
Top oil-producing countries

Imperial Russia produced 3,500 tons of oil in 1825 and doubled its output by mid-century. After oil drilling began in the region of present-day Azerbaijan in 1846, in Baku, the Russian Empire built two large pipelines: the 833 km long pipeline to transport oil from the Caspian to the Black Sea port of Batum (Baku-Batum pipeline), completed in 1906, and the 162 km long pipeline to carry oil from Chechnya to the Caspian. The first drilled oil wells in Baku were built in 1871–1872 by Ivan Mirzoev, an Armenian businessman who is referred to as one of the 'founding fathers' of Baku's oil industry.

At the turn of the 20th century, Imperial Russia's output of oil, almost entirely from the Apsheron Peninsula, accounted for half of the world's production and dominated international markets. Nearly 200 small refineries operated in the suburbs of Baku by 1884. As a side effect of these early developments, the Apsheron Peninsula emerged as the world's "oldest legacy of oil pollution and environmental negligence". In 1846 Baku (Bibi-Heybat settlement) featured the first ever well drilled with percussion tools to a depth of 21 meters for oil exploration. In 1878 Ludvig Nobel and his Branobel company "revolutionized oil transport" by commissioning the first oil tanker and launching it on the Caspian Sea.

Samuel Kier established America's first oil refinery in Pittsburgh on Seventh avenue near Grant Street in 1853. Ignacy Łukasiewicz built one of the first modern oil-refineries near Jasło (then in the Austrian dependent Kingdom of Galicia and Lodomeria in Central European Galicia), present-day Poland, in 1854–56. Galician refineries were initially small, as demand for refined fuel was limited. The refined products were used in artificial asphalt, machine oil and lubricants, in addition to Łukasiewicz's kerosene lamp. As kerosene lamps gained popularity, the refining industry grew in the area.

The first commercial oil-well in Canada became operational in 1858 at Oil Springs, Ontario (then Canada West). Businessman James Miller Williams dug several wells between 1855 and 1858 before discovering a rich reserve of oil four metres below ground. Williams extracted 1.5 million litres of crude oil by 1860, refining much of it into kerosene-lamp oil. Some historians challenge Canada's claim to North America's first oil field, arguing that Pennsylvania's famous Drake Well was the continent's first. But there is evidence to support Williams, not least of which is that the Drake well did not come into production until August 28, 1859. The controversial point might be that Williams found oil above bedrock while Edwin Drake's well located oil within a bedrock reservoir. The discovery at Oil Springs touched off an oil boom which brought hundreds of speculators and workers to the area. Canada's first gusher (flowing well) erupted on January 16, 1862, when local oil-man John Shaw struck oil at 158 feet (48 m). For a week the oil gushed unchecked at levels reported as high as 3,000 barrels per day.

The first modern oil-drilling in the United States began in West Virginia and Pennsylvania in the 1850s. Edwin Drake's 1859 well near Titusville, Pennsylvania, typically considered the first true modern oil well, touched off a major boom. In the first quarter of the 20th century, the United States overtook Russia as the world's largest oil producer. By the 1920s, oil fields had been established in many countries including Canada, Poland, Sweden, Ukraine, the United States, Peru and Venezuela.

The first successful oil tanker, the Zoroaster, was built in 1878 in Sweden, designed by Ludvig Nobel. It operated from Baku to Astrakhan. A number of new tanker designs developed in the 1880s.

In the early 1930s the Texas Company developed the first mobile steel barges for drilling in the brackish coastal areas of the Gulf of Mexico. In 1937 Pure Oil Company (now part of Chevron Corporation) and its partner Superior Oil Company (now part of ExxonMobil Corporation) used a fixed platform to develop a field in 14 feet (4.3 m) of water, one mile (1.6 km) offshore of Calcasieu Parish, Louisiana. In early 1947 Superior Oil erected a drilling/production oil-platform in 20 ft (6.1 m) of water some 18 miles off Vermilion Parish, Louisiana. Kerr-McGee Oil Industries, as operator for partners Phillips Petroleum (ConocoPhillips) and Stanolind Oil & Gas (BP), completed its historic Ship Shoal Block 32 well in November 1947, months before Superior actually drilled a discovery from their Vermilion platform farther offshore. In any case, that made Kerr-McGee's Gulf of Mexico well, Kermac No. 16, the first oil discovery drilled out of sight of land. Forty-four Gulf of Mexico exploratory wells discovered 11 oil and natural gas fields by the end of 1949.

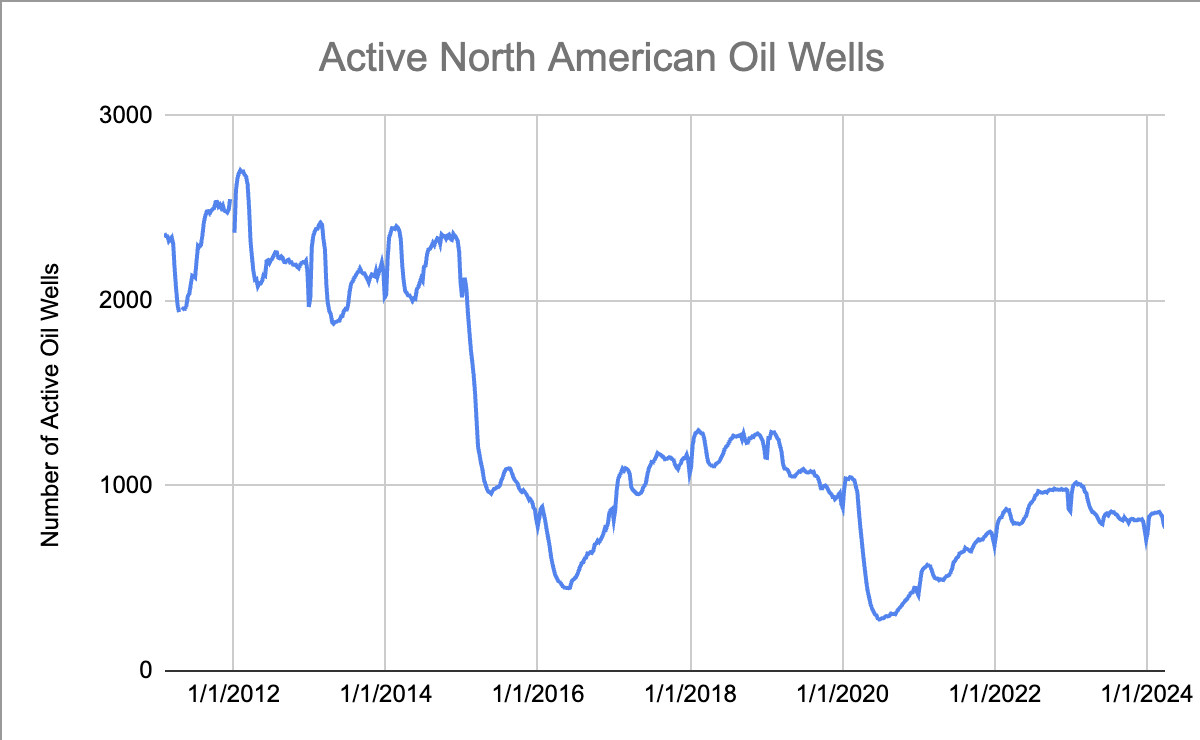
Total North American active oil wells, 2012-present

During World War II (1939–1945) control of oil supply from Romania, Baku, the Middle East and the Dutch East Indies played a huge role in the events of the war and the ultimate victory of the Allies. The Anglo-Soviet invasion of Iran (1941) secured Allied control of oil-production in the Middle East. The expansion of Imperial Japan to the south aimed largely at accessing the oil-fields of the Dutch East Indies. Germany, cut off from sea-borne oil supplies by Allied blockade, failed in Operation Edelweiss to secure the Caucasus oil-fields for the Axis military in 1942, while Romania deprived the Wehrmacht of access to Ploesti oilfields – the largest in Europe – from August 1944. Cutting off the East Indies oil-supply (especially via submarine campaigns) considerably weakened Japan in the latter part of the war. After World War II ended in 1945, the countries of the Middle East took the lead in oil production from the United States.

Important developments since World War II include deep-water drilling, the introduction of the drillship, and the growth of a global shipping network for petroleum – relying upon oil tankers and pipelines. In 1949 the first offshore oil-drilling at Oil Rocks (Neft Dashlari) in the Caspian Sea off Azerbaijan eventually resulted in a city built on pylons. In the 1960s and 1970s, multi-governmental organizations of oil–producing nations – OPEC and OAPEC – played a major role in setting petroleum prices and policy. Oil spills and their cleanup have become an issue of increasing political, environmental, and economic importance. New fields of hydrocarbon production developed in places such as Siberia, Sakhalin, Venezuela and North and West Africa.

With the advent of hydraulic fracturing and other horizontal drilling techniques, shale play has seen an enormous uptick in production. Areas of shale such as the Permian Basin and Eagle-Ford have become huge hotbeds of production for the largest oil corporations in the United States.

== Structure ==
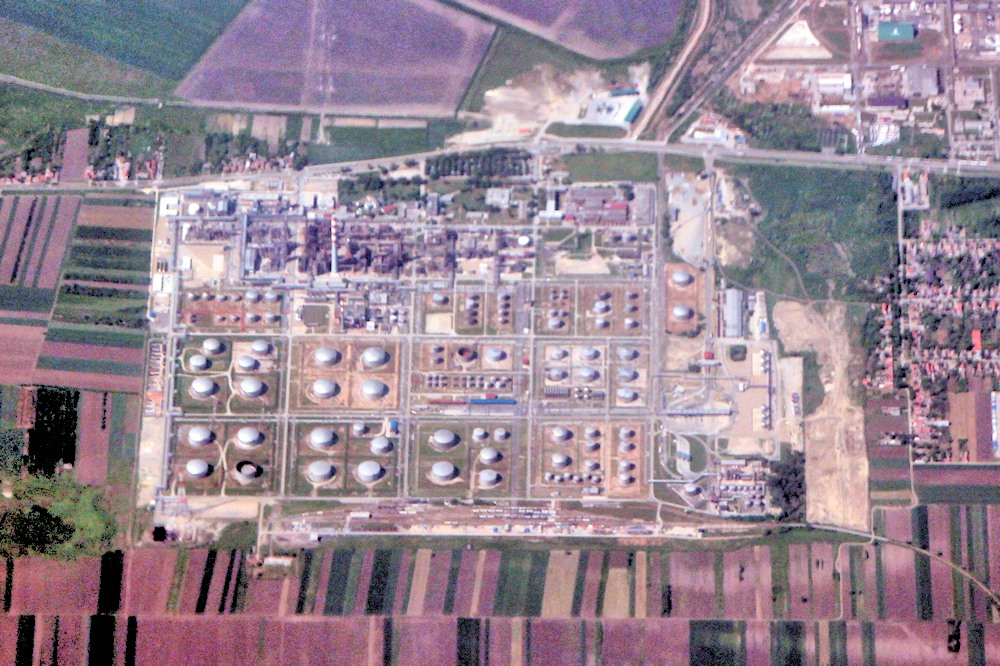
NIS refinery in Pančevo, Serbia

The American Petroleum Institute divides the petroleum industry into five sectors:

- upstream (exploration, development and production of crude oil or natural gas)
- downstream (oil tankers, refiners, retailers and consumers)
- pipeline
- marine
- service and supply

=== Upstream ===
Oil companies used to be classified by sales as "supermajors" (BP, Chevron, ExxonMobil, ConocoPhillips, Shell, Eni and TotalEnergies), "majors", and "independents" or "jobbers". In recent years however, National Oil Companies (NOC, as opposed to IOC, International Oil Companies) have come to control the rights over the largest oil reserves; by this measure the top ten companies all are NOC. The following table shows the ten largest national oil companies ranked by reserves and by production in 2012.

Top 10 largest world oil companies by reserves and production
Rank	Company (Reserves)	Worldwide Liquids Reserves (10^{9} bbl)	Worldwide Natural Gas Reserves (10^{12} ft^{3})	Total Reserves in Oil Equivalent Barrels (10^{9} bbl)	Company (Production)	Output (Millions bbl/day)^{[1]}
1	(Saudi Arabia) Saudi Aramco	260	254	303	(Saudi Arabia) Saudi Aramco	12.5
2	(Iran) NIOC	138	948	300	(Iran) NIOC	6.4
3	(Qatar) QatarEnergy	15	905	170	(United States) ExxonMobil	5.3
4	(Iraq) INOC	116	120	134	PetroChina	4.4
5	(Venezuela) PDVSA	99	171	129	(United Kingdom) BP	4.1
6	(United Arab Emirates) ADNOC	92	199	126	(Netherlands) (United Kingdom) Royal Dutch Shell	3.9
7	(Mexico) Pemex	102	56	111	(Mexico) Pemex	3.6
8	(Nigeria) NNPC	36	184	68	(United States) Chevron	3.5
9	(Libya) NOC	41	50	50	Kuwait Petroleum Corporation	3.2
10	(Algeria) Sonatrach	12	159	39	(United Arab Emirates) ADNOC	2.9
^1: Total energy output, including natural gas (converted to bbl of oil) for companies producing both.

Most upstream work in the oil field or on an oil well is contracted out to drilling contractors and oil field service companies.

Aside from the NOCs which dominate the Upstream sector, there are many international companies that have a market share. For example:

- BG Group
- BHP
- ConocoPhillips
- Chevron
- Eni
- ExxonMobil
- First Texas Energy Corporation
- Hess
- Marathon Oil
- OMV
- TotalEnergies
- Tullow Oil
- Rosneft

=== Midstream ===
Midstream operations are sometimes classified within the downstream sector, but these operations compose a separate and discrete sector of the petroleum industry. Midstream operations and processes include the following:

- Gathering: The gathering process employs narrow, low-pressure pipelines to connect oil- and gas-producing wells to larger, long-haul pipelines or processing facilities.
- Processing/refining: Processing and refining operations turn crude oil and gas into marketable products. In the case of crude oil, these products include heating oil, gasoline for use in vehicles, jet fuel, and diesel oil. Oil refining processes include distillation, vacuum distillation, catalytic reforming, catalytic cracking, alkylation, isomerization and hydrotreating. Natural gas processing includes compression; glycol dehydration; amine treating; separating the product into pipeline-quality natural gas and a stream of mixed natural gas liquids; and fractionation, which separates the stream of mixed natural gas liquids into its components. The fractionation process yields ethane, propane, butane, isobutane, and natural gasoline.
- Transportation: Oil and gas are transported to processing facilities, and from there to end users, by pipeline, tanker/barge, truck, and rail. Pipelines are the most economical transportation method and are most suited to movement across longer distances, for example, across continents. Tankers and barges are also employed for long-distance, often international transport. Rail and truck can also be used for longer distances but are most cost-effective for shorter routes.
- Storage: Midstream service providers provide storage facilities at terminals throughout the oil and gas distribution systems. These facilities are most often located near refining and processing facilities and are connected to pipeline systems to facilitate shipment when product demand must be met. While petroleum products are held in storage tanks, natural gas tends to be stored in underground facilities, such as salt dome caverns and depleted reservoirs.
- Technological applications: Midstream service providers apply technological solutions to improve efficiency during midstream processes. Technology can be used during compression of fuels to ease flow through pipelines; to better detect leaks in pipelines; and to automate communications for better pipeline and equipment monitoring.

While some upstream companies carry out certain midstream operations, the midstream sector is dominated by a number of companies that specialize in these services. Midstream companies include:

- Aux Sable
- Bridger Group
- DCP Midstream Partners
- Enbridge Energy Partners
- Enterprise Products Partners
- Genesis Energy
- Gibson Energy
- Inergy Midstream
- Kinder Morgan Energy Partners
- Oneok Partners
- Plains All American
- Sunoco Logistics
- Targa Midstream Services
- Targray Natural Gas Liquids
- TransCanada
- Williams Companies
- Petrolink

== Social impact ==
The oil and gas industry spends only 0.4% of its net sales on research & development (R&D) which is in comparison with a range of other industries the lowest share. Governments such as the United States government provide a heavy public subsidy to petroleum companies, with major tax breaks at various stages of oil exploration and extraction, including the costs of oil field leases and drilling equipment. In recent years, enhanced oil recovery techniques – most notably multi-stage drilling and hydraulic fracturing ("fracking") – have moved to the forefront of the industry as this new technology plays a crucial and controversial role in new methods of oil extraction.

Researchers have studied whether donations from oil and gas companies want to make lawmakers vote on environmental issues. Reports that oil and gas contributions to U.S. congressional candidates rose from about $35 million in 2010 to over $84 million in 2018. He also notes that this increase occurred as independent outside spending also grew through groups like independent committees, which are also called super PACs . Oil and gas companies are said to support candidates whose voting records align with the industry's policy preferences, especially on environmental regulation.

Scholars have examined how the petroleum industry has opposed climate policy by supporting economic explanations that emphasized the costs of proposed regulations and it's also described how industry-funded consultants and industry-linked organizations promoted these cost estimates in public communications and policy debates during the 1990s, including in the period leading up to the 1997 Kyoto climate negotiations.

Environmental scholars say that the bad side effects from fossil fuels, like pollution and climate change, aren't shared equally and often impact the vulnerable population more, calling this "fossil fuel racism," describing how fossil fuel systems can cause racial inequalities in environmental and public health risks. Civil rights groups such as the National Association for the Advancement of Colored People have supported environmental and climate justice and have opposed policies that increase reliance on fossil fuels.

There is criticism that comes towards the oil and gas drilling in how they affect the community overall which can take a toll on the ecosystem. They often call for less fossil fuel development and more use of energy development like wind and solar power.

== Environmental impact ==
=== Water pollution ===
Some petroleum industry operations have been responsible for water pollution through by-products of refining and oil spills. Though hydraulic fracturing has significantly increased natural gas extraction, there is some belief and evidence to support that consumable water has seen increased in methane contamination due to this gas extraction. Leaks from underground tanks and abandoned refineries may also contaminate groundwater in surrounding areas. Hydrocarbons that comprise refined petroleum are resistant to biodegradation and have been found to remain present in contaminated soils for years. To hasten this process, bioremediation of petroleum hydrocarbon pollutants is often employed by means of aerobic degradation. More recently, other bioremediative methods have been explored such as phytoremediation and thermal remediation.

=== Air pollution ===
The industry is the largest industrial source of emissions of volatile organic compounds (VOCs), a group of chemicals that contribute to the formation of ground-level ozone (smog). The combustion of fossil fuels produces greenhouse gases and other air pollutants as by-products. Pollutants include nitrogen oxides, sulphur dioxide, volatile organic compounds and heavy metals.

Researchers have discovered that the petrochemical industry can produce ground-level ozone pollution at higher amounts in winter than in summer.

=== Climate change ===
Greenhouse gases emissions from oil extraction and refining vary significantly across deposits due to differences in extraction techniques (such as flaring, methane venting, and fugitive emissions) as well as oil- and reservoir-specific characteristics.

Greenhouse gases caused by producing, refining, and burning fossil fuels drive climate change. In 1959, at a symposium organised by the American Petroleum Institute for the centennial of the American oil industry, the physicist Edward Teller warned of the danger of global climate change. Edward Teller explained that carbon dioxide "in the atmosphere causes a greenhouse effect" and that burning more fossil fuels could "melt the icecaps and submerge New York".

The Intergovernmental Panel on Climate Change, founded by the United Nations in 1988, concludes that human-sourced greenhouse gases are responsible for most of the observed temperature increase since the middle of the twentieth century.

As a result of climate change concerns, many people have begun using other methods of energy such as solar and wind. This recent shift has some petroleum enthusiasts skeptical about the future of the industry.

== See also ==
Industry pioneers

- Faustino Piaggio, an early oil industry pioneer

Oil production

- Corrosion inhibitors for petroleum industry
- Peak oil
- Oil terminal
- Oil supplies
- Integrated operations
- Instrumentation in petrochemical industries
- Standardization in oil industry
- ISO/TC 67
- List of crude oil products

Financial and political

- List of oil exploration and production companies
- List of largest oil and gas companies by revenue
- Chronology of world oil market events (1970–2005)
- Energy crisis: 1973 oil crisis, 1979 energy crisis
- Energy development
- Petroleum politics
- World oil market chronology from 2003
- Oil-storage trade
- Oil and gas law in the United States
- Fossil fuels lobby

Environmental issues

- Environmental impact of the petroleum industry
- Greenhouse gases
- Routine flaring
- Oil spills

Oil geology

- Abiogenic petroleum origin
- Fossil fuel
- Oil sands
- Petroleum geology
- Thermal depolymerization

Oil-producing areas

- History of the petroleum industry in Canada
- History of the petroleum industry in the United States
- List of oil fields
- Oil megaprojects
- List of countries by oil production
- Oil industry in Azerbaijan

Industry Research Projects

Other articles

- Continuous Drilling Provision
