= History of the petroleum industry in Norway =

The history of the petroleum industry in Norway is the most significant part of Norway's economic history, and significant across that of Europe's petroleum industry.

== Exploration ==
A letter dated 25 February 1958 from the Geological Survey of Norway to the Norwegian Ministry of Foreign Affairs stated that the chances of finding oil off the Norwegian coastline were negligible.

In May 1963, Norway declared that any oil found off its coast would belong to Norway. In March 1965, the boundaries of oil exploration were divided along the median line across the North Sea. In April 1965 Norway opened the first round of exploration drilling licences, with 22 in 78 areas.

Esso received three exploration drilling licences in the Norwegian continental shelf and began drilling on 19 July 1966. The first oil was found by Esso in 1967 in the second well that Esso drilled, known as 25/11-1; this became the Balder oil field. Esso began drilling on 17 November 1969 with the Ocean Viking platform, and discovered a large oil field on 24 December 1969 in the Chalk Group Unit 6, of Danian geological age; the well, 2/4-2, was the 34th oil well explored in the Norwegian sector of the North Sea; by this time over 200 exploration oil wells had been drilled in the North Sea. The discovery of oil in December 1969 was featured in an eight-part 2018 docudrama television series on NRK entitled Lykkeland. Norway announced the discovery of a large oil field on 2 June 1970.

A United Nations conference in 1973, under the United Nations Convention on the Law of the Sea, extended the area for oil exploration northwards into the Barents Sea. First oil delivery from the Johan Castberg field started in May 2025.

== Production ==
Production from the oil field discovered in December 1969 began on 15 June 1971; this was the first production of North Sea oil. Norway's state-owned oil production company was formed in 1972. The oil industry of Norway would be centred in Stavanger.

Production in the Norwegian Sea began in 1993, and that in the Barents Sea began in 2007.

== Refineries ==
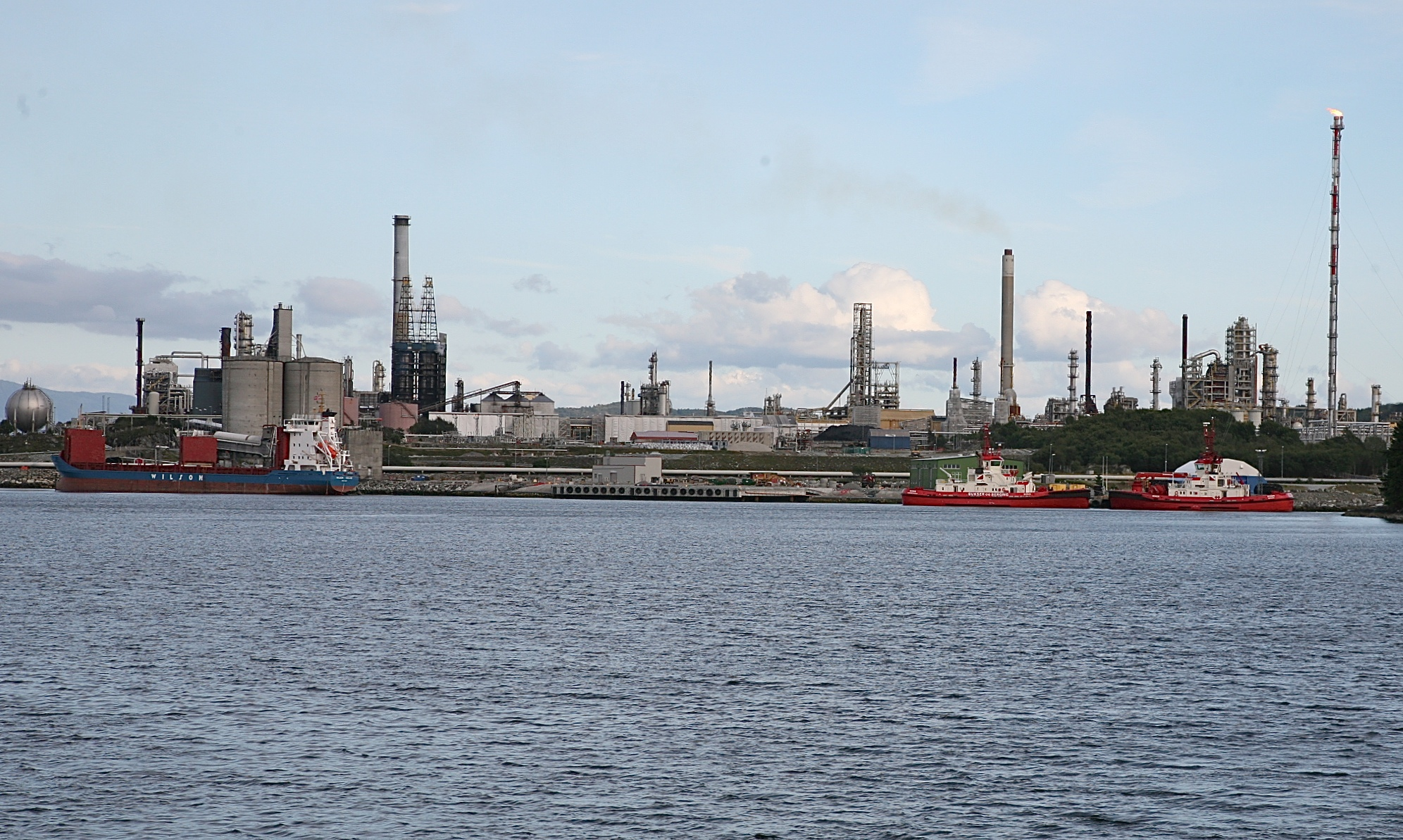
Mongstad oil refinery in August 2007

Mongstad, Norway's largest oil refinery, opened in 1975.

== Pipelines ==
A pipeline was laid across the North Sea southwards to Germany; divers working on the pipe would need up to 70 days of decompression, and suffered permanent physical injury.

== Economy of Norway ==
A sovereign wealth fund, the Oil Fund and part of the Government Pension Fund of Norway, was started in 1990. The petroleum industry in Norway is regulated by the Ministry of Petroleum and Energy.
