= Upstream (petroleum industry) =

Sector of the oil and gas industry

The oil and gas industry is usually divided into three major sectors: upstream (also called exploration and production or E&P), midstream and downstream. The upstream sector includes searching for potential underground or underwater crude oil and natural gas fields, drilling exploratory wells, and subsequently operating the wells that recover and bring the crude oil or raw natural gas to the surface.

The upstream industry has traditionally experienced the highest number of Mergers, Acquisitions (M&A) and Divestitures. M&A activity for upstream oil and gas deals in 2012 totaled $254 billion in 679 deals. A large chunk of this M&A, 33% in 2012, was driven by the unconventional/shale boom especially in the US followed by Russia and then Canada.

The aggregate value of upstream E&P assets available for sale (Deals in Play) reached a record-high of $135 billion in Q3 2013. The value of Deals in Play doubled from $46 billion in 2009 to $90 billion in 2010. With ongoing M&A activity, the level remained almost the same, reaching $85 billion in December 2012. However, the first half of 2013 saw approximately $48 billion of net new assets coming on the market. Remarkably, the total value of Deals in Play in Q3 2013 nearly tripled over 2009 to $46 billion, in less than four years.

== Business ==
This categorization comes from value chain concepts, even before formal development of Value Chain Management.

- Drilling Contractor Company

A company that owns and operates drilling rigs that are contracted by an operator to drill wells. Examples include Patterson UTI, Trans-ocean, Nabors, Independence Contract Drilling and Cactus.

- Integrated Oil & Gas Company:

A company that has upstream as well as downstream operations. Examples include Saudi Aramco, ExxonMobil, BP, Shell, ChevronTexaco and SOCAR.

- Independent Oil & Gas Company:

A company that has either upstream or downstream operations, but not both. Examples include Anadarko Petroleum, Sunoco, Phillips 66, ConocoPhillips and Murphy Oil.

- Oil Service Company:

A company that provides products and/or services to the oil and gas industry. Usually a combination of labor, equipment, and/or other support services. Examples include Schlumberger, Halliburton, Saipem and Baker Hughes.

- Oil Equipment Manufacturer:

A company that specializes in the sale and distribution of equipment to the oil and gas industry. Examples include Siemens, Schneider Electric and ABB.

- Security

Many major security companies take part in securing the industry.

== Upstream in ISO ==
ISO 14224 defines "Upstream" in its definition section as:
3.98 upstream
business category of the petroleum industry involving exploration and production.

Example: Offshore oil/gas production facilities, drilling rigs, intervention vessel.

== See also ==
- Coal bed methane
- Downstream (petroleum industry)
- Extraction of petroleum
- Gas field
- Hydrocarbon exploration
- List of oil exploration and production companies
- Midstream
- Natural Gas
- Natural gas condensate
- Natural-gas processing
- Petroleum
- Oil production plant
- Oil refinery
- Oil well
