= Aniruddha B. Pandit =

Indian chemical engineer (born 1957)

A. B. Pandit FNA, FASc
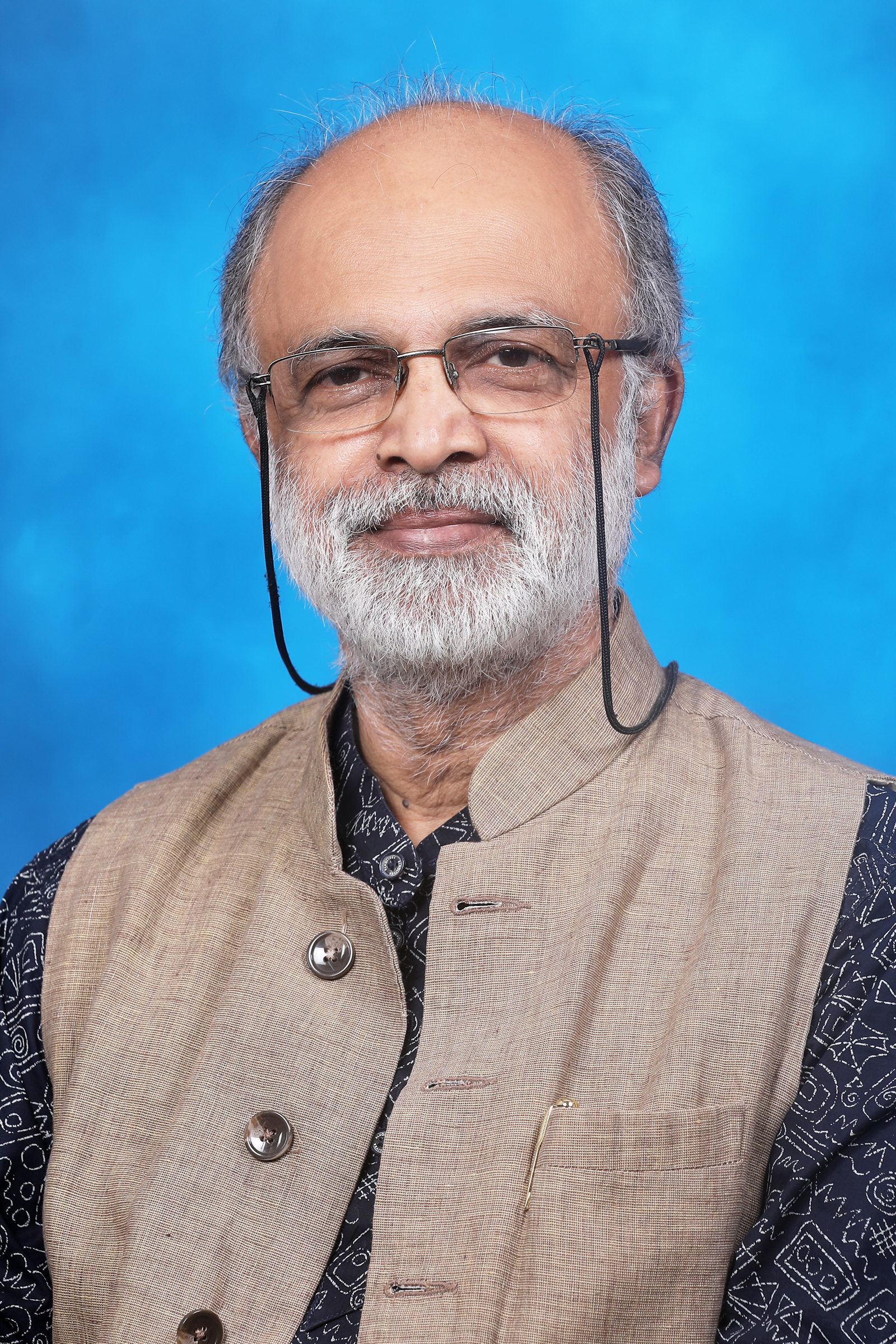
- Born: 7 December 1957 (age 68); Mumbai, Maharashtra
- Education: IIT-BHU (B.Tech); ICT Mumbai (Ph.D)
- Occupations: Chemical engineer University Administrator
- Years active: 1991–
- Known for: Research in chemical engineering
- Spouse: Anala Aniruddha Pandit (m. 1990)
- Awards: USNAE member (2023); Eminent Engineers' Awards (2021)
- Website: Research group page

Aniruddha Bhalchandra Pandit FNA, FASc(born 7 December 1957) is an Indian chemical engineer, inventor and academic, known for his fundamental and commercial research on cavitational reactors, design of multiphase reactors, bubble dynamics. He is the vice chancellor of the Institute of Chemical Technology, Mumbai (erstwhile UDCT) since 2019, succeeding G. D. Yadav.

In 2023, he is elected member of the United States National Academy of Engineering.

== Education and career ==
Pandit was born in Mumbai, Maharashtra to Bhalchandra Ramachandra and Sumati Pandit and attended the Institute of Technology, Banaras Hindu University. He graduated with a B.Tech. (Chem) degree in 1980 and joined the University Department of Chemical Technology of Bombay University (now ICT Mumbai) for his PhD (Tech) degree. He completed his PhD in 1984 under the guidance of Prof. Jyeshtharaj Joshi. He also worked as an instructor during this term.

From 1984 till 1990, he worked in University of Cambridge as a Research Associate with John Frank Davidson, working in the area of bubble break-up and design of multiphase reactors.

Pandit joined the UICT in 1991 as a reader and was promoted in 1996. He was a visiting professor at University of Cape Town and University of California, Santa Barbara, BITS Pilani, among others. He is an elected fellow of such science academies as United States National Academy of Engineering, Indian National Academy of Engineering, Indian National Science Academy (INSA), The World Academy of Sciences (2015), National Academy of Sciences, India, Maharashtra Academy of Sciences, and Indian Academy of Sciences.

== Research ==
Pandit is a renowned researcher in the field of cavitation and relevant chemical processing applications. His research interests include sonochemistry, industrial wastewater treatment, synthesis of chelating agents for wastewater treatment, mixing in mechanically agitated contactors, and the design of nozzles for hydrodynamic cavitation. He has also worked on polymer degradation, cellulose dissolution, and nanomaterials synthesis. As of 2023, he has published 446 journal articles, and holds 34 patents. His articles are reported to have an H-index of 84 and i10-Index of 360. He has guided 63 PhD and 101 master's graduates.

He is associated with a number of scientific journals as a member of their editorial boards; Ultrasonics Sonochemistry Journal (Elsevier), Chemical Engineering and Processing - Process Intensification (Elsevier), Industrial & Engineering Chemistry Research (ACS).

The Pandit research group has developed a method for cleaning and disinfecting stagnant water bodies and industrial effluents from various industries using hydrodynamic cavitation. This method was used to clean the Rankala Lake in Kolhapur, Maharashtra and the Bindusagar Lake in Bhubaneshwar, Odisha (a project inaugurated by the Chief Minister of Odisha in January). His research group has also developed solid-fuel burning stoves, used commonly in rural India, which cause lesser pollution and consume fuel efficiently. Research has also been done to convert keratin waste such as human hair, wool, and poultry feathers into fertilizers, pet, and animal feed using a cheap, eco-friendly and efficient method.

== See also ==
- Institute of Chemical Technology
- Man Mohan Sharma
