= Swaminathan Sivaram =

Indian chemist (born 1946)

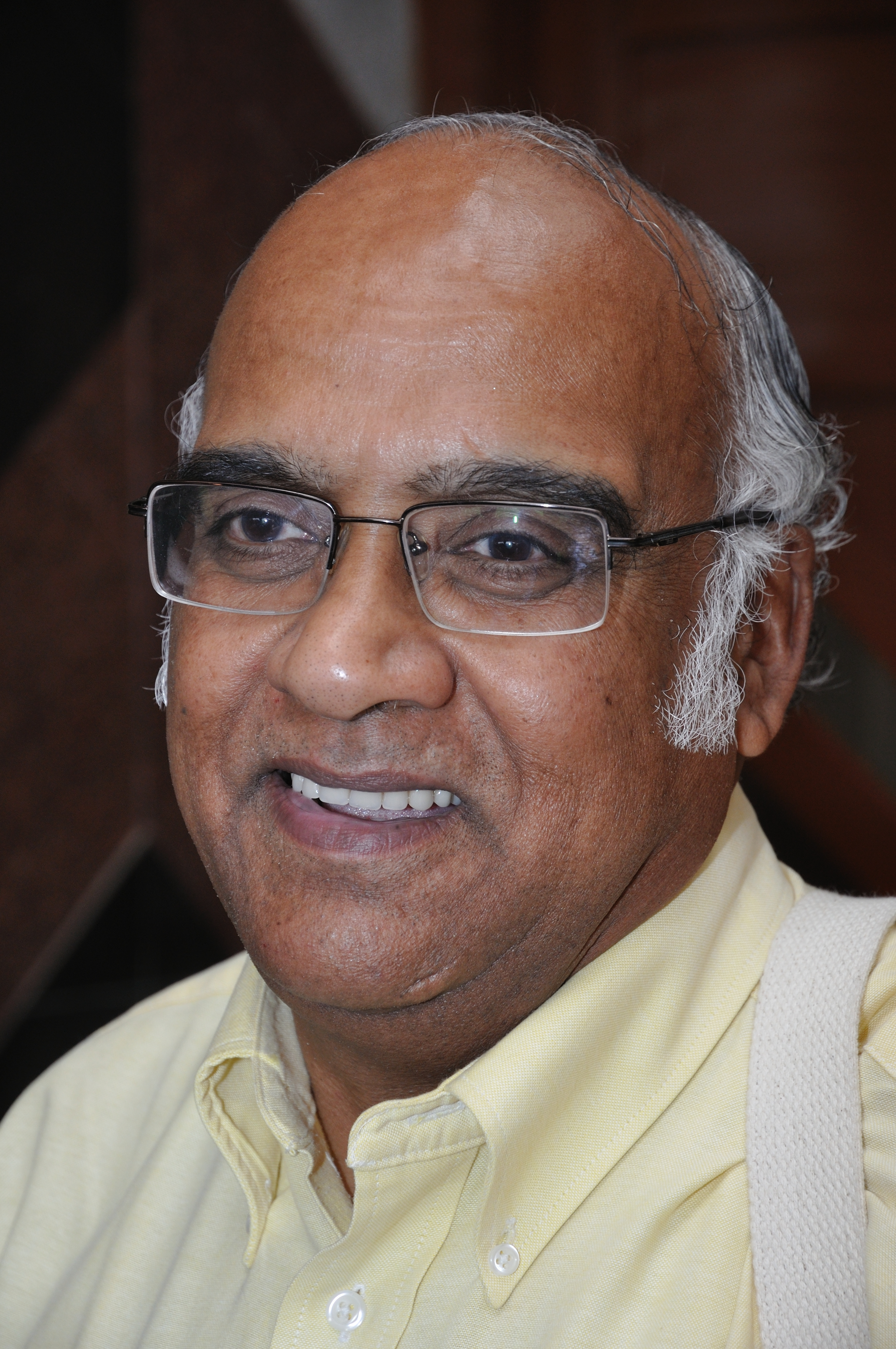
- Born: 4 November 1946 (age 79); Tamil Nadu, India
- Occupation: Chemist
- Known for: Polymer chemistry
- Awards: Padma Shri; INSA Vishwakarma Medal; CRSI Silver Medal; ICSA Millennium Medal; IITK Distinguished Alumnus Award; IACS S. R. Palit Memorial Award; K. G. Naik Gold Medal; FICCI Award; Om Prakash Bhasin Award; Goyal Prize; Distinguished Material Scientist of the Year Award; Professor M. Santappa Silver Jubilee Award; VASVIK Award; IICE R. A. Mashelkar Medal
- Website: Official website

Swaminathan Sivaram (born 4 November 1946) is an Indian polymer chemist, inventor, institution builder and a former director of the National Chemical Laboratory, Pune. He is known for his pioneering work on alkylation of tertiary alkyl halides with trialkylaluminum and olefin polymerization and holds the highest number of US patents by an Indian working outside the US. He is a fellow of several significant professional organizations. The Government of India awarded him the fourth highest civilian honour of the Padma Shri, in 2006, for his contributions to Indian science.

== Biography ==
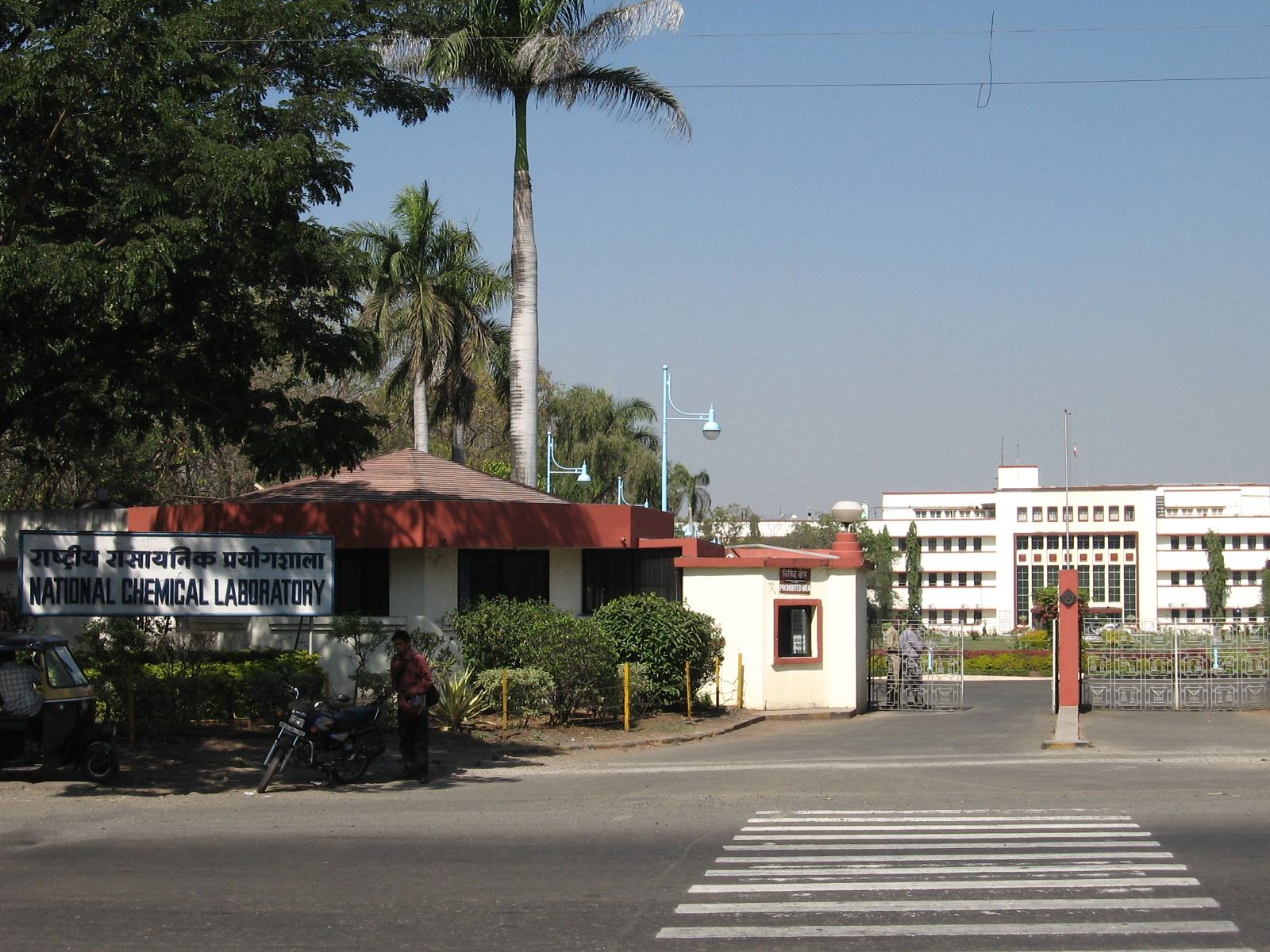
National Chemical Laboratory.

Sivaram was born in the south Indian state of Tamil Nadu on 4 November 1946. His early college studies were at Madras Christian College from where he passed the graduate degree (BSc) in chemistry in 1965 after which he secured his master's degree (MSc) from the Indian Institute of Technology, Kanpur in 1967. Moving to the US, he did his doctoral research under Nobel Laureate Herbert C. Brown at Purdue University and secured his doctorate (PhD) in 1972. He continued in the US for two more years and worked as a research associate at the Institute of Polymer Science of the University of Akron, Ohio. He returned to India in 1973 and joined the Indian Petrochemicals Corporation Limited (IPCL), Baroda as a research scientist where he worked in various capacities such as research manager and deputy general manager till 1988, when he moved to the National Chemical Laboratory (NCL) as the Head of the Department of Polymer Chemistry. In 2002, he was promoted as the director of the institution and worked there till his superannuation in 2010.

Sivaram has served as visiting faculty at many universities in India and abroad. He was a visiting scientist at the Blaise Pascal University in 1991 during September–October. In 1993–94, he was involved with the Institute of Chemical Technology as the K. S. S. Raghavan Chemical Weekly Visiting Professor of Polymer Science and Technology and has served the Universite Bordeaux in September – October 1995 as the visiting professor. He was also a guest lecturer at the Free University of Berlin in May 1999 and the Harold A. Morton Distinguished Visiting Professor at the University of Akron in 2006.

Sivaram has been involved with the Government of India and its various autonomous bodies and is a former member of the Scientific Advisory Committee to the Cabinet (SAC-C). He is also a former member of the Task Force on Public Sector of the Ministry of Heavy Industries and Public Enterprises, Innovation Council on Chemicals and Petrochemicals of the Ministry of Chemicals and Fertilizers and the Board of Trustees of the Oil and Natural Gas Commission (ONGC). He was the vice president of several science forums and societies such as the Indian Academy of Sciences from 2007 to 2012, the Indian National Science Academy from 2004 to 2006, the Chemical Research Society of India from 2005 to 2008 and the Materials Research Society of India from 2004 to 2007. He has sat on the Board of Governors of the Indian Institute of Technology, Mumbai, the Indian Institute of Science Education and Research, Pune and the Institute of Chemical Technology, Mumbai. He has served as the faculty selection committee of the Indian Institute of Technology for their Mumbai, Kanpur, Chennai and Hyderabad institutes and is a member of the Scientific Council for Catalysis of the Russian Academy of Sciences, Moscow.

== Legacy ==
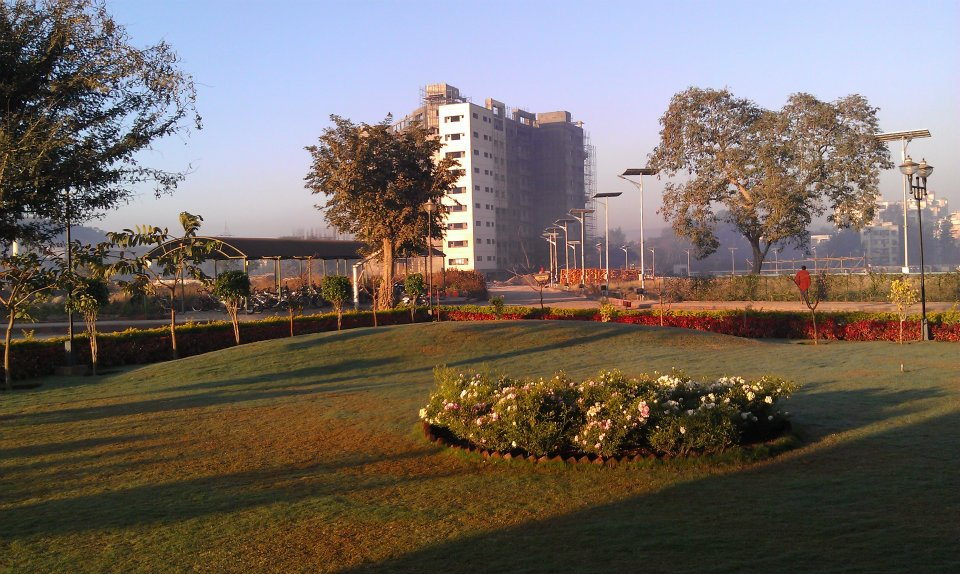
IISER Pune, New campus

During his US days, Sivaram was associated with Herbert C. Brown and J. P. Kennedy and worked on alkylation of tertiary alkyl halides with trialkylaluminum. His researches along with Kennedy is reported to have assisted in widening the knowledge base on the mechanism of carbocationic polymerization and led to the latter-day techniques of controlled and living carbocationic polymerization. His researches have also helped in creating new properties in polymers and threw more light on the synthesis, structure and properties of polymeric materials. He has also worked on polymer-layered clay nanocomposites and has been successful in synthesizing several organic modifiers for clay for the preparation of exfoliated nanocomposite of clay. The team led by him at the National Chemical Laboratory conducted research on olefin polymerization using Ziegler Natta catalysts which opened a new school of research in the topic. His researches are recorded in over 200 articles published in peer reviewed journals; ResearchGate, an online knowledge repository, has listed 225 of them. He is the author of Living Anionic Polymerization of Methyl Methacrylate, a book detailing his research on Living anionic polymerization. He has also edited two books, Polymer Science, (2 Volumes) and Macromolecular Symposia, Volume 240. Some of his articles have also been compiled as a book, Chemical vapor deposition: thermal and plasma deposition of electronic materials. He is the holder of approximately 100 patents of which 50 are approved in the US. He is known to be the holder of the highest number of US patents by an Indian-based outside the US and many of his inventions have been put to commercial use in India and abroad. He has also guided 36 students in their doctoral researches.

Sivaram's efforts are known in the establishment of the first R&D centre on petrochemical research in India at NCL and transforming the organization into a centre for interdisciplinary research. He is the founder of the NCL Innovation Park and the Technology-Business Incubator under the aegis of the Council of Scientific and Industrial Research (CSIR), a first time in India. He was involved in the establishment of Indian Institutes of Science Education and Research (IISER) and served as the project director during formation of IISER Pune, in 2006. He is the founder chairman Venture Center (Entrepreneurship Development Center), a not-for-profit initiative by the National Chemical Laboratory for promoting technology and knowledge-based enterprises for India, and sits on its board of directors.

== Awards and honours ==
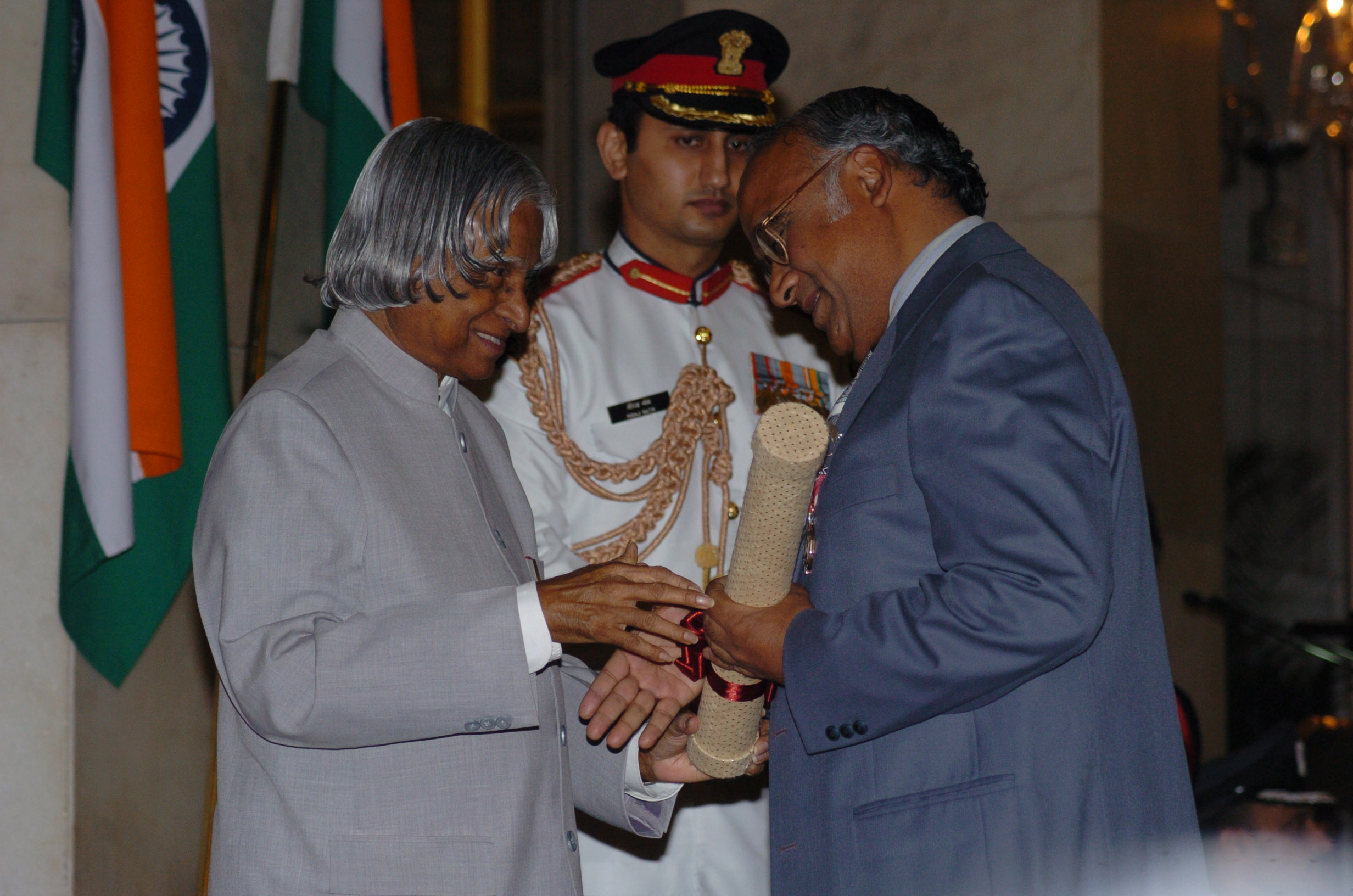
The President, Dr. A.P.J. Abdul Kalam presenting Padma Shri to Dr. Swaminathan Sivaram, a polymer chemist, at an Investiture Ceremony at Rashtrapati Bhavan in New Delhi on March 29, 2006

Sivaram, a Bhatnagar Fellow of the Council of Scientific and Industrial Research, is also an elected fellow of the Indian National Science Academy, Indian Academy of Sciences, National Academy of Sciences, India, The World Academy of Sciences, International Union of Pure and Applied Chemistry, Indian Institute of Chemical Engineers and the Indian National Academy of Engineering. (Note: Sivaram, a Bhatnagar Fellow of the Council of Scientific and Industrial Research (CSIR), was elected as the Fellow of the Indian Academy of Sciences and the National Academy of Sciences, India in 1992. The Indian National Science Academy elected him as their Fellow in 1998. He was selected for the J. C. Bose Fellowship of the Department of Science and Technology in 2007, the tenancy holding till 2011. He is also a fellow of the Indian National Academy of Engineering, The World Academy of Sciences (TWAS), Indian Institute of Chemical Engineers and the International Union of Pure and Applied Chemistry (IUPAC) and a recipient of the degree of the Doctor of Science (Honoris causa) from the Purdue University in 2010.)

In 1987, Sivaram received the VASVIK Industrial Research Award for applied industrial research. The next year, the Society of Polymer Science selected him for the Professor M. Santappa Silver Jubilee Award and he shared the 1995 Om Prakash Bhasin Award with G. Madhavan Nair and Prem Shanker Goel. The Federation of Indian Chamber of Commerce and Industry (FICCI) awarded him their annual honour for Physical Sciences in 1996 and the Indian Association for the Cultivation of Science presented him with the Professor S.R. Palit Award in 1997. The Indian Institute of Technology, Kanpur, his alma mater, awarded him the 1998 Distinguished Alumnus Award. He received the Silver Medal of the Chemical Research Society of India in 2002, followed by the Chemcon R. A. Mashelkar Medal of the Indian Institute of Chemical Engineers in 2003, the same year as he received the Vishwakarma Medal of the Indian National Science Academy.

The Government of India included him in the 2006 Republic Day Honours list for the civilian award of the Padma Shri and in 2010, Kurukshetra University awarded him the Goyal Prize for Applied Sciences for the year 2007. The same year, he received the Material Scientist of the Year Award of the Materials Research Society of India. He is also a recipient of the Millennium Medal of the Indian Science Congress Association and the K. G. Naik Gold Medal of the Maharaja Sayajirao University of Baroda.

== Selected articles ==
- S. Radhakrishnan, B. T. S. Ramanujam, A. Adhikary and S. Sivaram (2007). "High Temperature Polymer-Graphite Hybrid Composites for Bipolar Plates: Effect of Processing Conditions on Electrical Properties". J. Power Sources. 45 (1093): 702–707. Bibcode:2007JPS...163..702R. doi:10.1016/j.jpowsour.2006.08.019.
- U. Subramanyam & S. Sivaram (2007). "Kinetics of Hexene-1 Polymerization using N,N diisopropyl benzene 2,3, 1,8 naphthyl 1,4 diazabutane Dibromo nickel I Methylaluminoxane (MAO) Catalyst system". J. Polym. Sci. A. 45 (1093): 1093–1100. doi:10.1002/pola.21852.
- R. Gnaneshwar & S. Sivaram (2007). "End-Functional Poly (methyl methacrylate) s via Group Transfer Polymerization". J. Power Sources. 45 (2514): 2514. Bibcode:2007JPoSA..45.2514G. doi:10.1002/pola.22013.
- T. E. Sandhya, C. Ramesh and S. Sivaram (2007). "Copolyesters Based on Poly (butylenes terephthalate) s Containing Cyclohexyl and Cyclopentyl Ring: Effect of Molecular Structure on the Thermal and Crystallization Behavior". Macromolecules. 40: 6906. doi:10.1021/ma071272q.
- M. G. Ohara, D. Baskaran and S. Sivaram (2008). "Synthesis of amphiphilic poly(methyl methacrylate-b-ethylene oxide) copolymers from monohydroxy telechelic poly(methyl methacrylate) as macroinitiator". J. Polym. Sci. A. 46 (6): 2132–2144. Bibcode:2008JPoSA..46.2132D. doi:10.1002/pola.22548.
- S. R. Mallikarjuna & S. Sivaram (2008). "Polycarbonate – Clay Nanocomposites via in situ Melt Polymerization". Ind. Eng. Chem. Res. 49 (2217).
- R. Gnaneshwar & S. Sivaram (2010). "Addition of a Silyl Ketene Acetal to α,β-Unsaturated Cyclic Anhydrides". Synthetic Communications. 40 (16): 2353–2363. doi:10.1080/00397910903243815. S2CID 97299379.
- S. R. Mallikarjuna & S. Sivaram (2010). "Influence of Structure of Organic Modifiers and Polyurethane on the Clay Dispersion in Nanocomposites via in-situ Polymerization". J. Appl. Polym. Sci. 118 (1774).

== Orations and conferences ==
Sivaram has delivered several award lectures and orations; AVRA Research Foundation Award Lecture, B. D. Amin Memorial Lecture of Chemical Council, Mumbai, Dr. K.T. Achaya Memorial Lecture of Indian Institute of Chemical Technology, Hyderabad, Shriram Founder Memorial Lecture of Shriram Institute for Industrial Research, New Delhi, Petrotel Distinguished Lecture of Indian Institute of Technology, Kanpur, Kanpur, Dhirubhai Ambani Oration of Indian Institute of Chemical Engineers, Mumbai, Professor K. K. Balasubramanian Endowment Lecture of Indian Institute of Technology, Madras, N. R. Kamath Memorial Lecture of Institute of Chemical Technology, Mumbai and Professor Kaushal Kishore Memorial Lecture of Indian Institute of Science, Bangalore are some of the notable ones. He has been an invited speaker at the meetings of the American Chemical Society in 1985, 92 and 94, International Conferences on Ionic Polymerization (IUPAC) of 1995, 97, 99, 2001 and 2005, World Polymer Congress in 2000, Europolymer Congress in 2001, and the Polycondensation conferences of 1997, 2002 and 2004. He has also delivered keynote addresses at World Polymer Congress in 2004, 2006 and 2011, International Symposium on Materials for Advanced Technologies at Singapore in 2005 and the Indian-China-Singapore Trilateral Symposium on Advances in Nanosciences at Singapore in 2010.

Sivaram was associated with the International Conferences on Ionic Polymerization (IUPAC) for several of their conferences such as World Polymer Congress in 2000, 2003, 2004, 2010, 2011 and 2012 as a member of the International Organizing Committee. He was the chairman of the International symposium on Ionic Polymerization, India in 2005 and was involved in the organization of the Polymers in the Third Millennium of the Society of Chemical Industry at Montpellier in 2001, the Third International Conference on Materials for Advanced Polymerization at Kracow, Poland in 2009, International Symposium "Polycondensation 2010" at Rolduce Abbey, The Netherlands and the 2nd Polymer Congress of the Federation of Asian Polymers Societies at Beijing in 2011.
