= Jyeshtharaj Joshi =

Indian chemical engineer and nuclear scientist

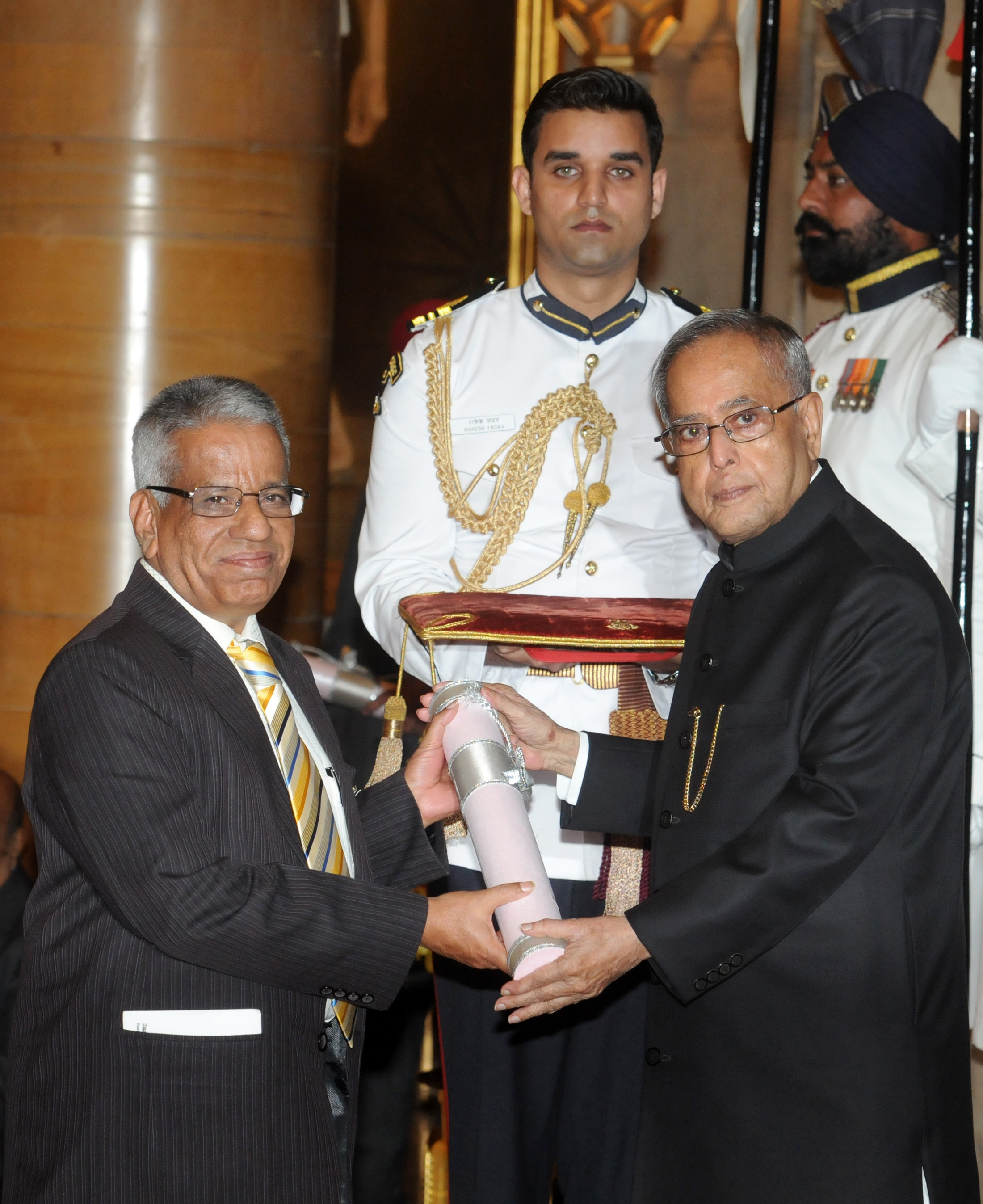
- Jyeshtharaj Joshi (foreground, left) receiving the Padma Bhushan award from Pranab Mukherjee
- Born: 28 May 1949 (age 77); Masur, Satara, Maharashtra, India
- Occupations: Chemical engineer, nuclear scientist
- Awards: Padma Bhushan; Shantiswarup Bhatnagar Prize; Dr. Anji Reddy Innovation Award; Indian Institute of Chemical Engineers Award; DAE-Homi Bhabha Chair Professor; Fellow of Indian National Science Academy; Fellow of The World Academy of Sciences; INSA Medal for Young Scientist; Fellow of Indian Academy of Sciences; Fellow of National Academy of Engineering

Jyeshtharaj Bhalchandra Joshi is an Indian chemical engineer, nuclear scientist, consultant and professor, widely known for his innovations in design of multiphase reactors and nuclear reactor designs and generally regarded as a respected teacher. He is currently the Chancellor of the Institute of Chemical Technology, Mumbai. He also held the DAE-Homi Bhabha Chair Professor at Homi Bhabha National Institute, Mumbai, and is the recipient of Shantiswarup Bhatnagar Prize for Engineering Sciences and many other awards and recognitions. He received the third highest civilian honour, the Padma Bhushan, in 2014 for his services to the field of chemical engineering and nuclear science.

== Biography ==
Joshi was born on 28 May 1949, in Masur, Satara district, in the Indian state of Maharashtra, as the son of Bhalachandra (Kaka) Joshi. He passed B.Chem. Eng. (Bachelor's in chemical engineering) in 1971 from the University Department of Chemical Technology (UDCT), Mumbai after which he started his research, under the guidance of renowned chemical engineer, Man Mohan Sharma. In 1977, he was awarded the Ph.D (Tech.).

Joshi lives in Mumbai and is married to Rujuta and the couple has a son, Aniruddha, who is PhD in Computer Science and Engineering from the Indian Institute of Technology, Mumbai. He's known to be an excellent teacher and remains in touch with most of his students at a personal and professional level.

== Career ==
Joshi started his career, in 1972, joining the faculty of the erstwhile University Department of Chemical Technology (UDCT), now known as Institute of Chemical Technology, Mumbai. He served as the Director of the Institute between 1999 and 2008. He was also instrumental in upgrading the institute to the status of a deemed university and increased fundraising for the Institute research by way of donations, research contracts and project consultancies. Joshi worked there for the most part of his career, in various positions and retired as its Director in 2009.

He has worked as a consultant and advisor to several large chemical industries in India and abroad. He has developed over 1000 novel multiphase reactors. His area of expertise lies in the design and scale-up as well as process intensification of the reactors making them globally competitive.

He joined as a Homi Bhabha Chair Professor in Homi Bhabha National Institute, Department of Atomic Energy, Mumbai in 2009. During his tenure, he was involved in development of safety systems for Advanced Heavy Water Reactor (AHWR) as well as research on carbon nanotube (CNT) fiber which subsequently led to the development of the indigenous bullet proof jacket, Bhabha Kavach at BARC. Since 2025, he is the Chancellor of the Institute of Chemical Technology Mumbai.

=== Positions held ===
Apart from the academic positions, Joshi has worked on the editorial or advisory board of many known and peer-reviewed scientific journals.

- Chemical Engineering Science Journal
- Chemical Engineering Research and Design Journal
- Reviews in Chemical Engineering
- Canadian Journal of Chemical Engineering

== Research and teaching ==
=== Scientific focus ===
Joshi is credited with many innovative designs in the area of multiphase reactors. He is reported to have successfully developed multiphase sparged and mechanically agitated reactors. This has helped in the set up of large number of commercial size reactors in India and abroad. Joshi published over 665 scientific papers he has published in peer-reviewed journals, with over 32,700 citations with an h-index of 89 on Google Scholar. Chem Tech Journal USA has recommended his procedures five times.

Some of his notable scientific works are:

- Development of inhouse codes for computational fluid dynamics (CFD) for multiphase dispersions and complex geometries.
- Performed the first Laser-Doppler anemometer (LDA) measurements in multiphase dispersions.
- Development of an algorithm for the prediction of fractional gas hold-up and bubble size distribution.
- Deployment of the PIV technique to shadography for measuring motion of dispersed phases (bubbles, drops and particles).
- Development of a methodology for estimating detailed knowledge of the entire range of length, velocity and energy scales of turbulent structures in large number of Chemical Process Equipment.
- Development of a relationship between the mean and turbulent flow patterns and the design parameters such as axial mixing, mixing time, heat and mass transfer coefficients.
- Analysis of the multiphase reaction viz. absorption of nitrogen oxides (NOx) in water, alkaline and acidic solutions.
- Development of new designs for household cooker and stoves with thermal efficiencies of 50 to 60%, an improvement on the conventional cookers which have a thermal efficiency of 12 to 20%. He has released these technologies on a commercial basis.

He is currently involved in research on the biomass valorization for production of biochar and bio-oil, extraction of bioactives sich as tannins, beta-keratinoids, and polyphenols from cashew apple, solar thermal technologies, and design of small modular reactors.

=== Teaching work ===
Joshi is widely respected as a mentor-teacher; he has successfully guided over 140 doctoral and 60 masters students and has supervised over 25 post doctoral students. He has taught the course on "Design of Multiphase Reactors" for over 40 years at ICT, Mumbai.

== Awards and recognitions ==
Joshi has been honoured, both academically and socially, by several prominent institutions.

Social recognitions

- Padma Bhushan
- Shantiswarup Bhatnagar Prize for Engineering Sciences – 1991
- Amar-Dye-Chem Award for Excellence in Research and Development – Indian Institute of Chemical Engineers – 1983
- Herdillia Award – 1989
- Vaswik Award – 1992
- Dr KG Naik Gold Medal – 1995
- Chemtech Foundation Award – 1997
- Goyal Foundation Award – 1998
- Dr. Anji Reddy Innovation Award – 2005
- Indian Institute of Chemical Engineers Award – 2007
- Satara Bhushan, 2025

Academic recognitions

- DAE-Homi Bhabha Chair Professor, Homi Bhabha National Institute, Mumbai
- J. C. Bose Fellow in the Institute of Chemical Technology, Mumbai
- Fellow of Indian National Science Academy (FNA)
- Fellow of Academy for the Developing World (TWAS)
- INSA Medal for Young Scientist – 1981
- Fellowship of Indian Academy of Sciences, Bangalore – 1991
- Diamond Award of UDCT – 1994
- Viswakarma Medal of INSA – 2000
- Zyed Hussain Zaheer Medal of INSA – 2008
- Elected to the National Academy of Engineering – 2021 (for contributions in rational design of multiphase chemical process equipment and leadership in shaping the Indian chemical industry.
- INAE Lifetime Contribution Award, 2025

== Books ==
- Climate Change Clean Energy Transition
- Handbook of Multiphase Flow Science and Technology

== See also ==
- Man Mohan Sharma
