= A. V. Rama Rao =

Indian chemist (born 1935)

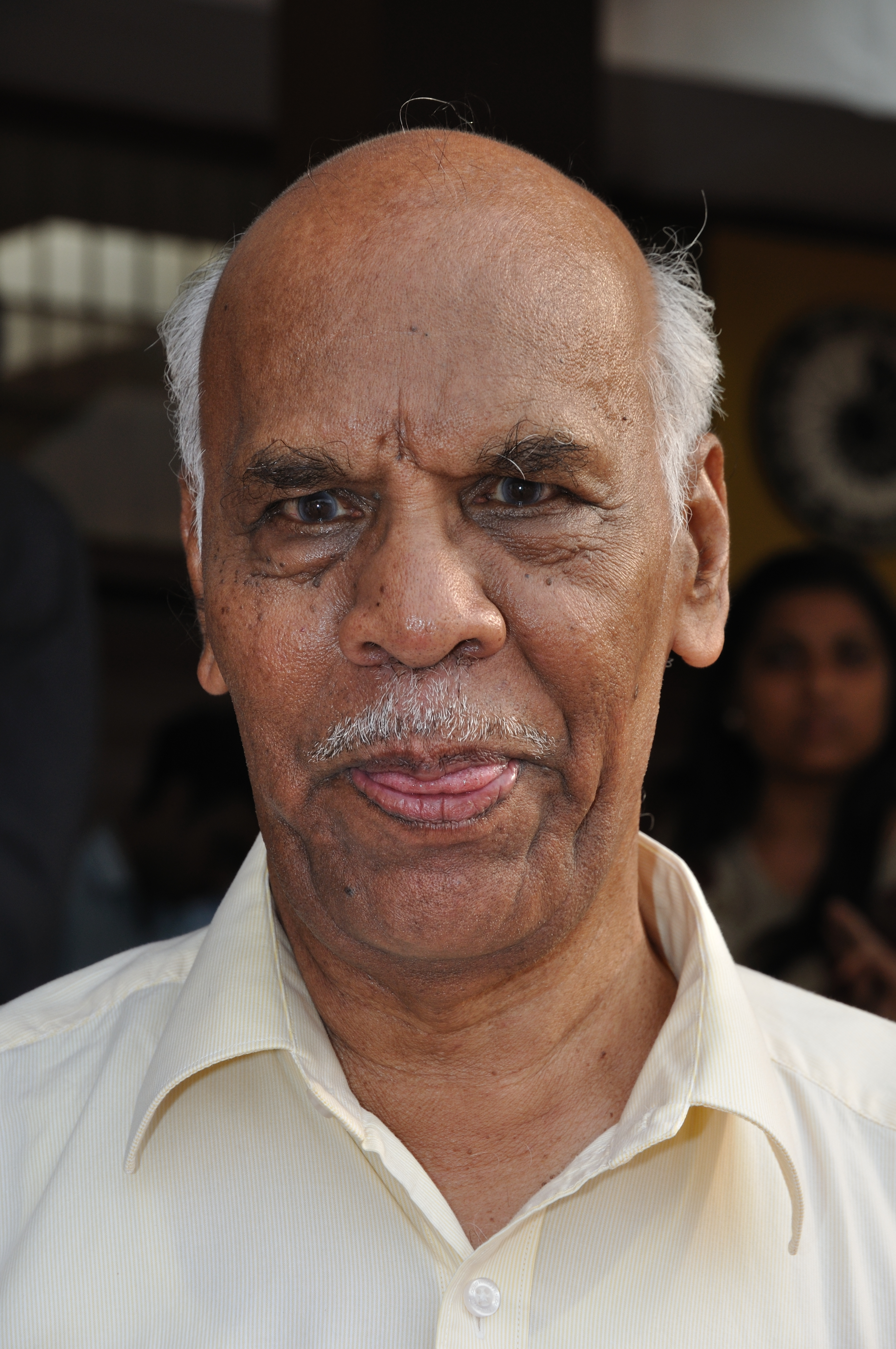
- Born: Alla Venkata Rama Rao; 2 April 1935 (age 91); Guntur, Madras Presidency, British India (present-day Andhra Pradesh, India)
- Occupation: Chemist
- Known for: Organic synthesis
- Spouse: Hymavathy
- Children: Two sons, 1daughter
- Awards: Padma Bhushan (2016); Padma Shri (1991); K.G. Naik Gold Medal; VASVIK Industrial Research Award; Asiatic Society Medal; CSIR Technology Award; TWAS Technology Award; UDCT Distinguished Alumni and Diamond Award; ICT Platinum Award; CSIR Business Prize; Om Prakash Bhasin Award; Chemical Research Society Gold Medal; ISC Presidential Gold Medal; Dr. Yellapragada Subba Rao Award; P. C. Ray Medal; Dr. Y. Nayudamma Gold Medal; INSA Viswakarma Medal; Ranbaxy Research Foundation Award; FICCI Award

Alla Venkata Rama Rao (born 2 April 1935) is an Indian inventor and chemist, known for his pioneering research in the field of drug technology. He is the founder of the A. V. Rama Rao Research Foundation, a non governmental organization promoting research and doctoral studies in chemistry and Avra Laboratories, an organization dealing in intermediates and active pharmaceutical ingredients, used in therapeutics. An elected fellow of the Indian National Science Academy, Indian Academy of Sciences, National Academy of Sciences, India, and Third World Academy of Sciences (TWAS), Rama Rao is a recipient of several awards such as TWAS Technology Award, VASVIK Industrial Research Award and Om Prakash Bhasin Award. The Government of India awarded him the Padma Shri in 1991 and the Padma Bhushan in 2016.

== Biography ==
Rama Rao was born in a Kapu family on 2 April 1935 in Guntur, Andhra Pradesh to a government employee as one of his nine children. As his father had to work at various places due to frequent transfers, he stayed with his grand parents at Guntur during his school days. He graduated in chemistry (BSc) from A. C. College of Andhra University in 1956 and worked for one year at his alma mater as a demonstrator, before moving to Mumbai to secure his post-graduate degree in Pharmaceuticals and Fine Chemicals from the UDCT of Mumbai University in 1960. This was followed by doctoral studies under the guidance of Krishnaswami Venkataraman, the first Indian director of the National Chemical Laboratory (NCL), to obtain a PhD in 1965. He continued his research at NCL, working there as a B Grade Scientist, till 1975 when he joined Elias James Corey, 1991 Nobel laureate in Chemistry, at Harvard University for a two-year stint at research along with the American organic chemist. He returned to India in 1977 and continued his research at NCL for another eight years. In 1985, he was appointed as the director of the Indian Institute of Chemical Technology (IICT) (then known as Regional Research Laboratory) where he worked till 1995. After his superannuation from IICT, he founded Avra Laboratories, at Hyderabad, then capital of Andhra Pradesh, for high-end contract research and manufacture of intermediates and active pharmaceutical ingredients for the medical industry. The company operates out of three centres in Hyderabad and one in Visakhapatanam.

Rao married Hymavathy during his early years at NCL and the couple has two sons, Chandra and Ramakrishna, both doctorate holders in chemistry, assisting their father at Avra Laboratories. The family lives in Hyderabad, attending to the businesses of Avra Laboratories and Avra Synthesis, a sister concern. He serves as the managing director of both companies while holding the directorship of Andhra Sugars Limited, manufacturers of industrial chemicals and supplies.

== Legacy ==
Rao's research, in the beginning, was focused on synthetic dyes and advanced studies on plant and insect pigments. His elucidation of the structure of the lac dye as a composition of four different constituents, A, B, C and D variants of the Laccaic acid was one of his early achievements. Working further on the biogenetic origin of the product, he explored other insect pigments such as kermesic acid, erythrolaccin, and ceroalbolinic acid which led to the revision of the established concepts of their origin. His research led to the isolation of 100 new compounds from plants and insects. Association with Corey at Harvard University shifted his focus to studies related to the synthesis of biologically active natural products and he turned his attention to antitumor antibiotics, macrolide, immunosuppressants and cyclic peptides. After his return to India and resuming his career at NCL, he set up a school for synthesis of biofunctional molecules. Later, he guided the Indian Institute of Chemical Technology to become one of the top schools in India and introduced private and public sector industry participation in the research projects of the institution. The laboratory he established at IICT was fully funded by the members of the industry. He has mentored 109 research scholars in their doctoral studies as well as several post doctoral fellows.

The contributions of Rama Rao are reported to be noteworthy in the area of organic synthesis, especially asymmetric synthesis. He is known to have developed cheaper methodology for the synthesis of anti-tumour antibiotics such as Anthracyclines, Fredericamycin-A, Cervinomycins A1 and A2, Aronorosin, and Lavendamycin. He evolved a new method for the construction of the spiro[2,2]-nonane system, a constituent of Fredericamycin A, a first-time achievement in the world, and succeeded in its total synthesis. He proposed alternative methodologies for the synthesis of MeBmt, a variety of amino acid present in cyclosporin-A and of FK-506k, a 23-membered macrolide with 14-asymmetric carbons, which are reported to be noteworthy achievements in the field of asymmetric synthesis. His work also covered the synthesis of depsipeptides such as Jaspamide and Geodiamolides and macrolides, namely Zearalenone, Rifamycin-S, Rhizoxin and Rapamycin.

Rao is the pioneer of Chiral synthesis and technology in India and is known to have synthesized compounds of high structural diversity like Coriolic acid, Dimorphicolic acid, β-Lactam antibiotics, Azamacrolides, Camptothecin, Andrimid and Chrysanthemic acid. His work on K-13 has been adopted for the synthesis of Vancomycin and has helped in the synthesis of vancomycinic acid and the biphenyl segment of Vancomycin. Cipla, an Indian drug manufacturer, utilised the cost-effective methodology Rao introduced in the manufacture of Azidothymidine (AZT), the first effective drug for the disease management of AIDS. His research have also helped in the synthesis of HIV inhibitors namely Betzalladines, Calanolides, Mischellamines and Abbot's protease inhibitor. Cipla have acknowledged Rao's contributions in the formulations of several drugs such as Salbutamol, Vinblastine, Vincristine and Etoposide, apart from AZT.

In 1995, when Rao set out to establish his own research centre, Avra Laboratories, several agencies such as Dai-ichi Karkaria, G.D. Searle, LLC and Council for Scientific and Industrial Research provided him with financial and infrastructural assistance. He undertook several research assignments under the aegis of the centre for Drug Manufacturers like G. D. Searle, Pfizer and Bristol-Myers Squibb; his successful assignment of stabilizing a molecule with anti-asthmatic properties for Cytomed, a US drug manufacturer, was one of them. His early research on plants and insects has been documented in over 70 scientific papers and the latter day work by way of over 190 scientific papers, totalling 260 papers, published in peer-reviewed journals. Chemical Reviews, a known journal, invited him to contribute to their special issue on the synthesis of bio-functional molecules in 1995. He holds 30 patents, for chemical synthesis and isolation processes, many of which are in use with drug manufacturers in the US and India. Besides being a member of many government policy-making bodies, he has been associated with the World Health Organization and the Ozone Cell of United Nations Environmental Programme. He has also delivered many keynote addresses and Endowment lectures at various conferences. A. V. Rama Rao Research Foundation, the science forum he founded, promotes research, conducts doctoral courses in association with Osmania University and has instituted awards, together with Indian Institute of Chemical Engineers (IICHe), for recognising excellence in chemical research.

== Awards and recognitions ==
The Indian Academy of Sciences, Bengaluru, elected Rao as their Fellow in 1985. The Indian National Science Academy and the National Academy of Sciences, India, the two other major science academies in India, followed suit, by electing him as a Fellow in 1986 and 1989, respectively. Subsequently, the Third World Academy of Sciences also elected him as a Fellow in 1995. He received the K. G. Naik Medal in 1982 and, two years later, he was awarded the 1984 VASVIK Industrial Research Award. The Government of India included him in the 1991 Republic Day honours list for the civilian award of the Padma Shri. He was awarded the Durga Prasad Khaitan Memorial Medal of the Asiatic Society in 1992 and the Council for Scientific and Industrial Research (CSIR) Technology Award reached him in 1993.

The Academy of Sciences for the Developing World (TWAS) honoured him with their Technology Award in 1994, making him the first Indian chemist to receive the award. He received three more awards the same year, the first, UDCT Distinguished Alumni and UDCT Diamond Award, from his alma mater, Institute of Chemical Technology, followed by CSIR Business Prize from the Council for Scientific and Industrial Research and Om Prakash Bhasin Award from Shri Om Prakash Bhasin Foundation. The first decade of the 21st century saw him receiving three awards, Chemical Research Society Gold Medal in 2006, Indian Science Congress Presidential Gold Medal in 2007 and Institute of Chemical Technology, Mumbai Platinum Award in 2009. In 2012, he was awarded the Dr. Yellapragada Subba Rao Award, by the Nellore based foundation, in the name of the late Indian biochemist. He is also a recipient of P. C. Ray Medal, Dr. Y. Nayudamma Gold Medal, INSA Viswakarma Medal, Ranbaxy Research Foundation Award and FICCI Award. Jawaharlal Nehru Centre for Advanced Scientific Research instituted a lecture series, A. V. Rama Rao Lecture Series, composed of Foundation lectures and Prize lectures, to commemorate his 70th birthday. Indian Space Research Organization (ISRO), in association with Avra Laboratories, has also instituted an award lecture in his honour. Archive for Organic Chemistry issued a commemorative issue in 2005, to mark the 70th birth year of Rama Rao.

== See also ==
- Elias James Corey
- Institute of Chemical Technology
- Chiral synthesis
- National Chemical Laboratory
- Indian Institute of Chemical Technology
