= G. D. Yadav =

Indian chemical engineer (born 1952)

G. D. Yadav NAE (US), FNAI (US), FTWAS, FNA, FASc, FNASc, FNAE, FRSC (UK), FIChemE (UK), FICS, FIIChE
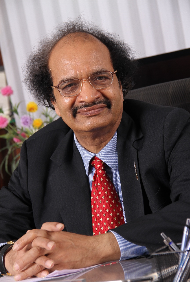
- Prof. Yadav in 2024
- Born: Ganapati Dadasaheb Yadav; 14 September 1952 (age 73); Arjunwada, Radhanagari, Kolhapur district, Maharashtra, India
- Years active: 1976-Present
- Known for: Research in Green Chemistry and Technology; Chemical Engineering
- Children: 2
- Awards: Padma Shri in 2016

Ganapati Dadasaheb Yadav (born 14 September 1952), better known as G. D. Yadav, is an Indian chemical engineer, educator and academic. He is currently president of the Indian Chemical Society. He has made contributions to green chemistry, catalysis, chemical reaction engineering, process development and nanotechnology. He served as the founding Vice Chancellor of the Institute of Chemical Technology (ICT), Mumbai, from 2009 to 2019, where he is currently an emeritus Professor of Eminence. From 2022 to 2025, he was the National Science Chair of the Science and Engineering Research Board (later merged into the Anusandhan National Research Foundation, Government of India). He previously served as J.C. Bose National Fellow.

Yadav's research spans sustainable technologies, including biomass valorization, green hydrogen production, and carbon dioxide utilization, with over 570 peer-reviewed publications, 136 patents, and an h-index of 71.

A recipient of the Padma Shri in 2016, he is an elected fellow of the National Academy of Sciences, India (FNASc), The World Academy of Sciences (FTWAS), Indian National Science Academy (FNA) and the National Academy of Inventors (FNAI). In 2024, Yadav was featured in the Asian Scientist 100 magazine. In 2025, Yadav was honoured with the Bhatnagar fellowship by the Council of Scientific and Industrial Research.

== Early life and education ==
Yadav was born in the small village of Arjunwada in Radhanagari Tehsil of Kolhapur district, Maharashtra. In 1970, he joined the University Department of Chemical Technology (UDCT) of Bombay University, earning a Bachelor of Chemical Engineering degree in 1974. He pursued his PhD under Man Mohan Sharma at the same institution, completing it in 1980.

== Connection with Industry and Boards ==
He currently serves as an Independent Director on the boards of multiple listed chemical companies: Godrej Industries, Clean Science & Technology, Meghmani Organics, Bhageria Industries, Astec Lifesciences, Dorf Ketal Chemicals India, Supriya Lifesciences and Sharp Mint. Previously, he served on the boards of Aarti Industries and Survival Technologies.

== Recognitions ==
He became international member of the U.S. National Academy of Engineering in (2022). Furthermore, he was elected a fellow of the U.S. National Academy of Inventors in (2022) and Canadian Academy of Engineering (2026). He is also a Fellow of TWAS, INSA, IAS, NASI and INAE.

Following his tenure as vice chancellor, R.A. Mashelkar appointed him emeritus professor of eminence at Institute of Chemical Technology, Mumbai.

He was awarded the fourth highest civilian honour, the Padmashri in 2016. In 2026, he was also selected for the Danckwerts Memorial Lecture Award-jointly conferred by IChemE (UK), AIChE, and Elsevier.

Other awards also include the Rasayan MahaRatna (2025), Eminent Engineer Award, and the Bharat Ratna Dr. A.P.J. Abdul Kalam Award (2022). He also the current president of the Indian Institute of Chemical Engineers and the Indian Chemical Society.

== Service to professional bodies as President ==
=== Catalysis Society of India ===
He served as the Chairman of the Mumbai Chapter of the Catalysis Society of India, significantly increasing its membership. Later, as the President of the Catalysis Society of India, he facilitated an agreement to transform its bulletin into the journal Catalysis in Green Chemistry and Engineering, published by Begell House, USA. He was conferred with the Prof. S.K. Bhattacharya Eminent Scientist Award in 2007.

=== Editorships ===
Since 2021, he has been the Associate Editor of Frontiers in Sustainability and the Editor-in-Chief of the Journal of the Indian Chemical Society (Elsevier Publication).

== Advocacy for Chemical Engineering Education ==
In May 2025, he was the sole Indian invited to participate in the prestigious Nobel Symposium on Chemistry for the Future held in Stockholm, Sweden, where he signed the Stockholm Declaration on Chemistry of the Future, both in his individual capacity and as President of the Indian Chemical Society.

In June 2025, he was appointed to the Finance Committee of Commonwealth Chemistry and also elected Communications Director of the Federation of Asian Chemical Societies (FACS).

In July 2025, he was honored with the Paryavaran Bhushan (Environment Laureate) award by the Maharashtra Pollution Control Board (MPCB) and the Environment Club of India (ECI) for his outstanding contributions to environmental sustainability.

== See also ==
- Institute of Chemical Technology
- Man Mohan Sharma
