= Ujwal =

Ujwal may refer to:

- Ujwal Ghimire, Nepalese filmmaker
- Ujwal Nirgudkar, Indian chemical engineer
- Ujwal Thapa, Nepalese activist
- Ujwal DISCOM Assurance Yojana, Indian government program

== See also ==
- Ujjwal, alternative spelling of the Indian male given name
- Ujwala Nikam, Indian cricketer
