= Ujjal =

Ujjal may refer to:

- Ujjal Bhuyan (born 1964) a judge of the Supreme Court of India
- Ujjal Chatterjee (born 1959) Indian politician
- Ujjal Dosanjh (born 1947), Canadian politician
- Ujjal Singh (1895 – 1983) Indian politician

== See also ==
- Uzzal Bangladeshi film actor, producer and director, whose name is sometimes written Ujjal
- Ujwal (disambiguation)
