= Devang =

Devang is an Indian given name, which means "one who is part or fragment of God or supreme deity". Notable people with the name include:

- Devang Gandhi (born 1971), Indian cricketer
- Devang Patel (born 1970), Indian singer, actor, and dancer
- Devang Vipin Khakhar (born 1959), Indian chemical engineer
