= Pramod P. Wangikar =

Indian chemical engineer and professor

- Born: Maharashtra, India
- Education: University Department of Chemical Technology; University of Bombay; University of Iowa
- Known for: Studies on Bioenergy
- Awards: 1997 DAE Young Scientist Award; 1998 AICTE Career Award for Young Teachers; 2005 INAE Young Engineer Award; 2005 IITB G. R. Manudhane Award; 2006 N-BIOS Prize; 2016 IIChE Chemcon Award
- Scientific career
- Fields: Chemical engineering
- Workplaces: IIT Bombay

Pramod P. Wangikar is an Indian chemical engineer and a professor at the Department of Chemical Engineering of the Indian Institute of Technology, Bombay. Known for his studies in the field of bioenergy, Wangikar is a recipient of the Sartorius India Chemcon Distinguished Speaker Award of the Indian Institute of Chemical Engineers. The Department of Biotechnology of the Government of India awarded him the National Bioscience Award for Career Development, one of the highest Indian science awards, for his contributions to biosciences in 2006.

== Biography ==
Pramod P. Wangikar, born in the Indian state of Maharashtra, graduated in chemical engineering from the Department of Chemical Technology University of Bombay in 1991 and moved to the US for his doctoral studies at the University of Iowa from where he secured a PhD in 1995. After completing his post-doctoral work in the US, he returned to India in 1997 to join the Department of Chemical Engineering of the Indian Institute of Technology, Bombay as a faculty member and serves as a professor at the institute.

Wangikar is known to have done advanced research in the fields of structural bioinformatics and metabolic modeling. At IIT Bombay, the team led by him are exploring the possibilities on Carbon Capture and Utilization (CCU) using algae and biotransformation using enzyme engineering. His studies have been documented by way of a number of articles (Note: Please see Selected bibliography section) and ResearchGate, an online repository of scientific articles has listed 96 of them.

The Department of Atomic Energy selected Wangikar for the Young Scientist Award in 1997. He received the Career Award for Young Teachers of the All India Council for Technical Education in 1998 and the BOYSCAST fellowship of the Department of Science and Technology in 2003. The year 2005 brought him two awards, the Young Engineer Award of the Indian National Academy of Engineering and the G. R. Manudhane Excellence in Research Award of IIT Bombay. The Department of Biotechnology of the Government of India awarded him the National Bioscience Award for Career Development, one of the highest Indian science awards in 2006. He received the Sartorius India Chemcon Distinguished Speaker Award of the Indian Institute of Chemical Engineers (IIChE) in 2016.

== Selected bibliography ==
- Singh, M; Sasi, P; Gupta, V H; Rai, G; Amarapurkar, D N; Wangikar, P P (8 February 2012). "Protective effect of curcumin, silymarin and N-acetylcysteine on antitubercular drug-induced hepatotoxicity assessed in an in vitro model". Human & Experimental Toxicology. 31 (8): 788–797. Bibcode:2012HETox..31..788S. doi:10.1177/0960327111433901. PMID 22318308. S2CID 24096054.
- Vinh, Nguyen Xuan; Chetty, Madhu; Coppel, Ross; Wangikar, Pramod P. (1 October 2011). "GlobalMIT: learning globally optimal dynamic bayesian network with the mutual information test criterion". Bioinformatics. 27 (19): 2765–2766. doi:10.1093/bioinformatics/btr457. ISSN 1367-4803. PMID 21813478.
- Vinh, Nguyen Xuan; Chetty, Madhu; Coppel, Ross; Wangikar, Pramod P. (13 November 2011). "Dynamic Bayesian Network Modeling of Cyanobacterial Biological Processes via Gene Clustering". Neural Information Processing. Lecture Notes in Computer Science. Vol. 7062. Springer, Berlin, Heidelberg. pp. 97–106. doi:10.1007/978-3-642-24955-6_12. ISBN 9783642249549.

== See also ==
- Modelling biological systems
- Biological network
