= Rajinder Kumar (chemical engineer) =

Indian chemical engineer and professor (1934–2022)

- Born: 9 September 1934; Punjab, India
- Died: 7 February 2022 (aged 87); Bengaluru, India
- Education: Panjab University; Delhi Technological University; Indian Institute of Science
- Known for: Modelling of multiphase phenomena
- Awards: 1976 Shanti Swarup Bhatnagar Prize; 1985 IIChE Herdilia Award; 1986 VASVIK Award; 1988 MSUoB K. G. Naik Gold Medal; 1989 INSA Syed Hussain Zaheer Medal; 1991 Om Prakash Bhasin Award; 1991 IISc Alumnus Award; 1991 FICCI Award; 1997 INSA Shanti Swarup Bhatnagar Medal; 2003 Padma Bhushan; 2008 IIChE Lifetime Achievement Award
- Scientific career
- Fields: Hydrodynamics; Multiphase phenomena
- Workplaces: Indian Institute of Science; Jawaharlal Nehru Centre for Advanced Scientific Research
- Doctoral advisor: E. Weingaertner; R. L. Datta

Rajinder Kumar (9 September 1934 – 7 February 2022) was an Indian chemical engineer and a former professor at the Indian Institute of Science. He is known for his studies on multiphase phenomena and is an elected fellow of the Indian National Science Academy, Indian Academy of Sciences, and the Indian National Academy of Engineering. The Council of Scientific and Industrial Research, the apex agency of the Government of India for scientific research, awarded him the Shanti Swarup Bhatnagar Prize for Science and Technology, one of the highest Indian science awards for his contributions to Engineering Sciences in 1976. (Note: Long link - please select award year to see details) He received the third highest Indian civilian award of the Padma Bhushan in 2003. He is also a recipient of Om Prakash Bhasin Award and the VASVIK Industrial Research Award.

== Biography ==
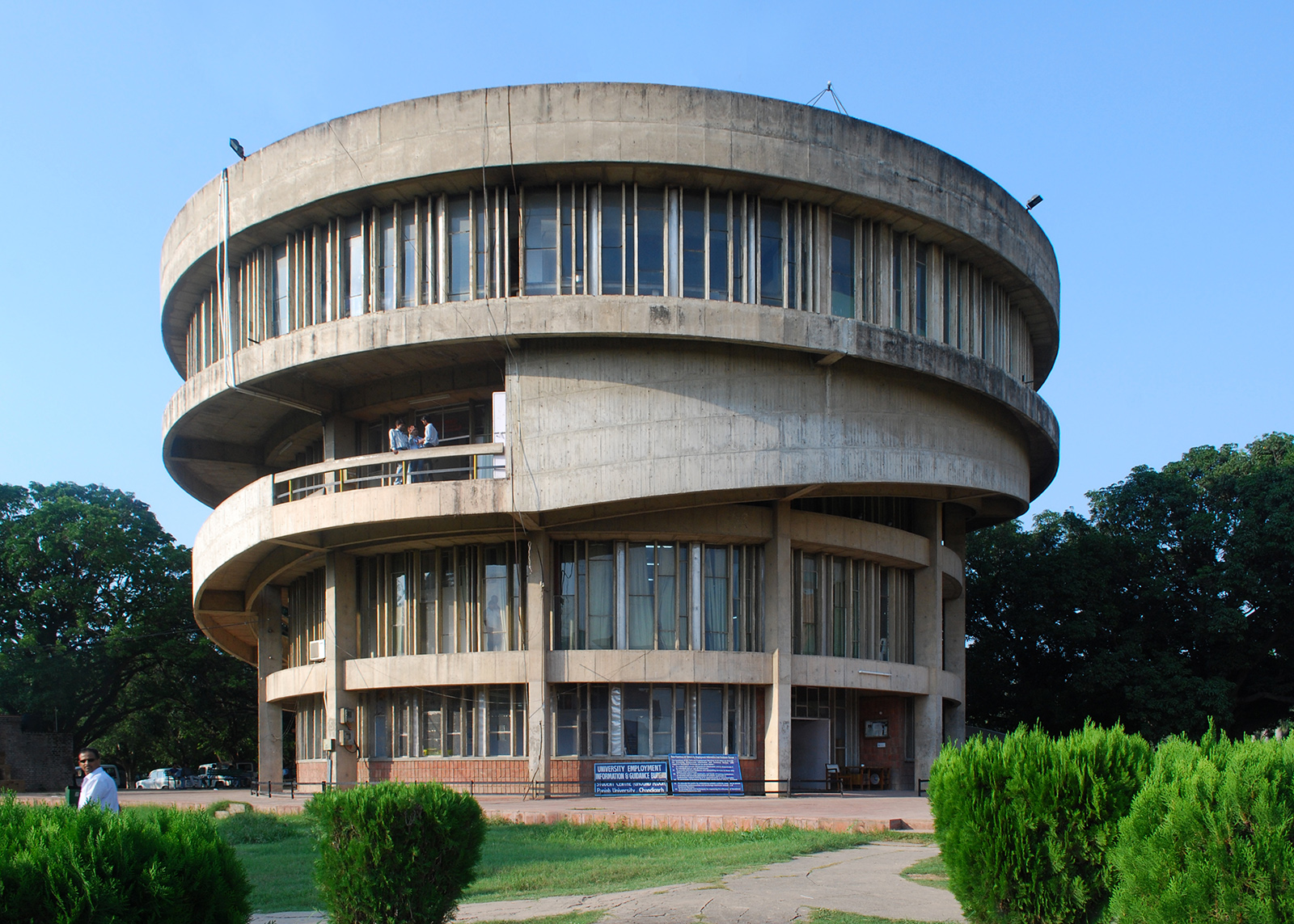
Punjab University, Chandigarh

Rajinder Kumar, born on 9 September 1934 in the Indian state of Punjab, graduated in science (BSc hons) from Punjab University, Chandigarh in 1954 and did his master's degree at Delhi Technological University (then known as Delhi Polytechnic) to receive his degree of MSc Tech from Punjab University in 1955. He joined the Indian Institute of Science in 1958 as a junior research assistant and simultaneously did his doctoral studies under the guidance of E. Weingaertner and R. L. Datta but submitted his thesis at Punjab University to secure a PhD in 1965. He served IISc in various capacities, as a lecturer (1963–67), assistant professor (1967–70), professor (from 1970) and at the time of his superannuation in 1995, he was holding the position of Divisional Chairman and Dean. He was also a member of the Internal Review Committee of the IISc in 2014. Post-retirement, he serves as an honorary professor at Jawaharlal Nehru Centre for Advanced Scientific Research.

Kumar died on 7 February 2022, at the age of 87.

== Legacy ==
Focusing his studies mainly on multiphase phenomena, Kumar is known to have done extensive researches on hydrodynamics and mass transfer in multiphase systems. He developed a two-stage model of bubble formation from single submerged nozzles which clarified the discrepancies in experimental data and is in use with industrially–relevant distributors. He developed a set of performance prediction protocols to be employed in foam bed contactors and batch sonochemical reactors. He also contributed to the development of a large scale fluidized bed reactor by which copper sulphate is manufactured directly from chalcopyrites. His researches have been documented in several peer-reviewed articles; (Note: Please see Selected articles section) the online article repository of Indian Academy of Sciences has listed 63 of them. He sat in the Society and the Governing Body of the Council of Scientific and Industrial Research and has been associated with government departments and agencies such as the Department of Science and Technology, Indian Council of Medical Research, National Digital Research Centre and National Innovation Foundation as a member of their various committees. He was a member of the Indian National Science Academy Council in 1990 and held the vice-president's chair during 1991–92.

== Awards and honors ==
The Council of Scientific and Industrial Research awarded Kumar the Shanti Swarup Bhatnagar Prize, one of the highest Indian science awards in 1976 and the Indian Institute of Chemical Engineers awarded him the Herdilia Award in 1985. A year later, he received the VASVIK Industrial Research Award followed by the K. G. Naik Gold Medal of the Maharaja Sayajirao University of Baroda in 1988. The Indian National Science Academy selected him for the Syed Hussain Zaheer Medal in 1989; INSA would honor him again in 1997 with Shanti Swarup Bhatnagar Medal The year 1991 brought him three awards, Om Prakash Bhasin Award, FICCI Award and Alumnus Award for excellence in research of the Indian Institute of Science. (Note: He shared the IISC Alumnus Award in its inaugural year with Padmanabhan Balaram) The Government of India included him in the 2003 Republic Day honors list for the third highest civilian award of the Padma Bhushan. In 2008, the Indian Institute of Chemical Engineers awarded him the Lifetime Achievement Award.

Kumar held the Jawaharlal Nehru Birth Centenary Visiting Fellowship of INSA in 1995. The Indian Academy of Sciences elected him as a fellow in 1979 and he became an elected fellow of the Indian National Science Academy in 1985. He is also an elected fellow of the Indian National Academy of Engineering. The list of award orations delivered by him include Professor N.R. Dhar Memorial Lecture of the National Academy of Sciences, India.

== Selected bibliography ==
- Basu, Suddhasatwa; Kumar, R.; Gandhi, K. S. (1997). "Detachment of a coalesced-phase blod from a circular obstacle in a Hele-Shaw cell". Chemical Engineering Science. 52 (16): 2849–2855. Bibcode:1997ChEnS..52.2849B. doi:10.1016/S0009-2509(97)00092-4.
- Rajan, R.; Kumar, R.; Gandhi, K. S. (1998). "Modelling of sonochemical oxidation of the water-KI-CCl4 system". Chemical Engineering Science. 53 (2): 255–271. doi:10.1016/S0009-2509(97)00211-X.
- Niyogi, Debdarsan; Kumar, R.; Gandhi, K. S. (1999). "Water blown free rise polyurethane foams". Polymer Engineering & Science. 39 (1): 199–209. doi:10.1002/pen.11408.
- Bandyopadhyaya, Rajdip; Kumar, R.; Gandhi, K. S. (2000). "Simulation of precipitation reactions in reverse micelles". Langmuir. 16 (18): 7139–7149. doi:10.1021/la000101a.
- Bhattacharjee, Samita; Kumar, R.; Gandhi, K. S. (2001). "Modelling of protein mixture separation in a batch foam column". Chemical Engineering Science. 56 (19): 5499–5510. Bibcode:2001ChEnS..56.5499B. doi:10.1016/S0009-2509(01)00156-7.

== See also ==
- Sonochemistry
- Hele-Shaw flow
