= Ashwin Dani =

Indian businessman (1943/1944 2023)

- Born: 1943/1944; Bombay, Bombay Province, British India
- Died: 28 September 2023 (aged 79)
- Education: Institute of Chemical Technology (B.S.); University of Akron (M.S.)
- Occupation: Businessman
- Title: Non-executive chairman, Asian Paints Ltd

Ashwin Suryakant Dani (1943/1944 – 28 September 2023) was an Indian billionaire, businessman, and the non-executive chairman of Asian Paints Ltd, India's largest paint company. He was the vice chairman and managing director from December 1998 to March 2009. Ashwin was among the top 50 richest Indians.

== Early life ==
Dani was born in Mumbai based Jain family, India. His father Suryakant was one of the co-founders of Asian Paints. Ashwin obtained his Bachelor of Science degree from the Institute of Chemical Technology, University of Mumbai; his Bachelor of Science and Technology in Pigment, Paints and Varnish from UDCT, Mumbai; his Master's degree in Polymer Science from University of Akron, Ohio; and a diploma in Color Science from Rensselaer Polytechnic, Troy, New York.

Dani's first job was in 1967 as a development chemist with Inmont Corp (now BASF) in Detroit. He joined Asian Paints in 1968 as a senior executive and moved through successively senior positions such as director of R&D, works director, whole-time director, and vice chairman.

At Asian Paints, Dani was responsible for the development and introduction of many products for the first time in India. He pioneered the idea of computerised colour matching in Indian industry.

Dani was instrumental in setting up PPG Asian Paints, a 50-50 joint venture between Asian Paints Limited and PPG Industries, and was a member of its board from its inception in 1997.

== Associations ==
Dani was one of the two founding members of Colour Group of India, a body dedicated to the promotion of computerised colour matching and measurement of colour by instruments and computers. Dani was an adviser to the central board of trustees of the Employees Provident Fund. He was president of the Indian Paint Association, president of the board of governors of the UDCT Alumni Association, and a member of the board of management of the Institute of Chemical Technology.

Dani was a member of the board and audit committee of Sun Pharmaceuticals from January 2004 to September 2018. He was also on the board of ACC Ltd, an Indian cement company, since December 2011, and was the chairman of its nomination and remuneration committee and a member of its audit committee.

Dani was the president of Kapadwanj Kelavani Mandal, Kapadwanj, District Kaira, Gujarat from November 2008 to June 2017. Kapadwanj Kelavani Mandal runs a 6,000-student educational institute for pre-primary to post-graduation students in science, commerce, and arts.

== Personal life and death ==
Dani was married to Ina Dani and had three children. His third son Malav Dani is on the board of Asian Paints as a non-executive director.

Ashwin Dani died on 28 September 2023, at the age of 79.

== Awards ==
- 2002: Cheminor Award for excellence in Supply Chain, Indian Institute of Materials Management
- 2003: Achiever of the Year Award – Chemical Industry, Chemtech Foundation
- 2003: Ernst & Young Entrepreneur of the Year in the Manufacturing category
- 2011: Lifetime Achievement Award, Indian Paint Association
- 2012: Colour Society Lifetime Achievement Award
- 2015: Businessman of the Year, Business India Magazine
- 2017: B. Krishnamurthy Award of Excellence, Hyderabad Management Association and Centre for Organisational Development
