= Chandrashekhar Sonwane =

Indian-American scientist

Chandrashekhar Sonwane FRAes
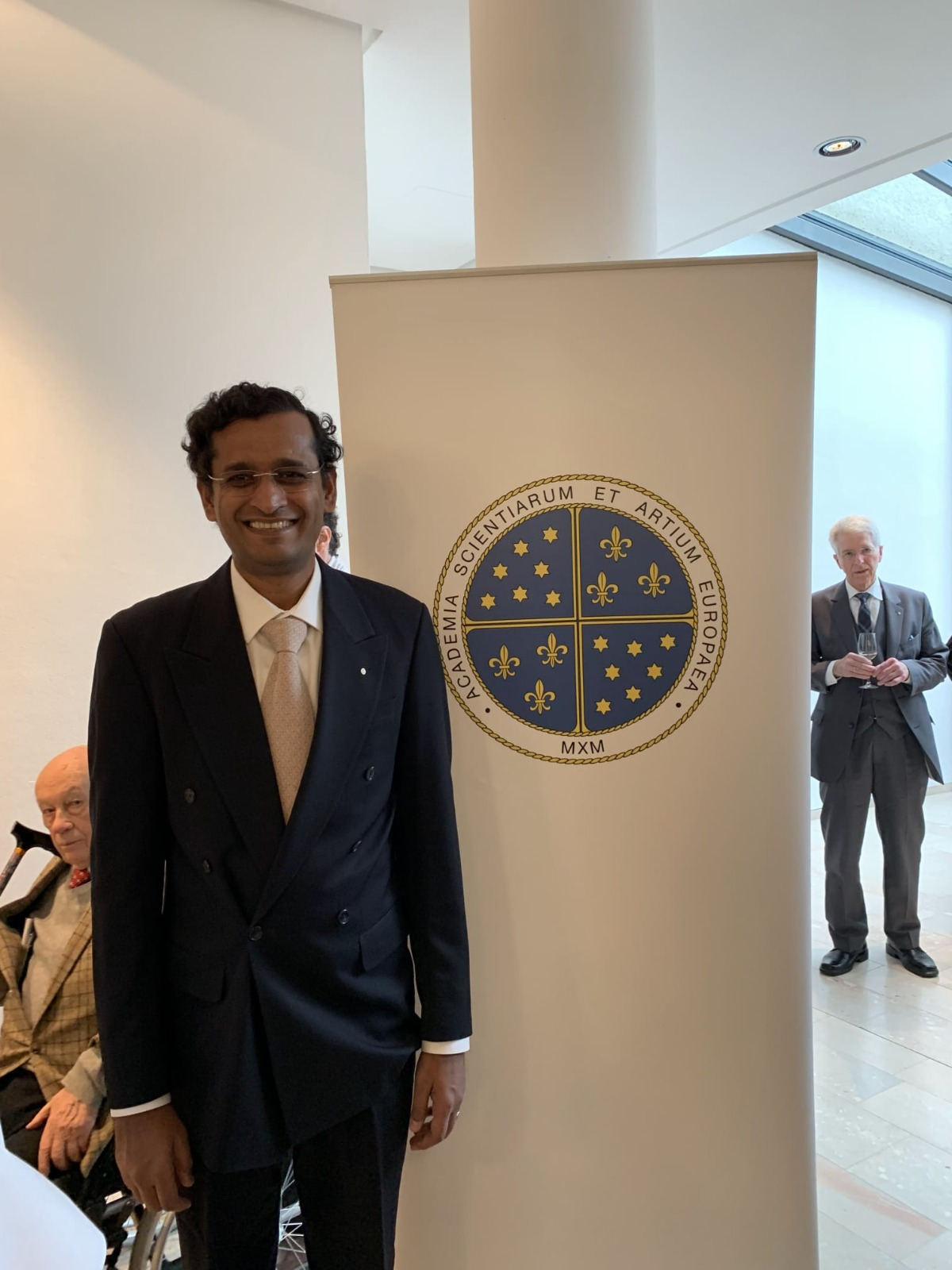
- Dr Sonwane at European Academy of Arts and Science, Salzburg, Austria in 2019
- Born: Chandrashekar Ganpatrao Sonwane; 2 May 1972 (age 54); Maharashtra, India
- Citizenship: American
- Education: Institute of Chemical Technology (B.Sc); Indian Institute of Technology Bombay (M.Sc); University of Queensland (PhD)
- Scientific career
- Thesis: Fundamental studies in nanoporous and mesoporous materials (2000)

Chandrashekhar Ganpatrao Sonwane FRAes (born May 2, 1972) is an Indian American scientist who works in the fields of space launch, air breathing propulsion and chemical and power industries. Sonwane is known for contributing to several aerospace companies including Aerojet Rocketdyne, Pratt & Whitney Rocketdyne and supported various NASA's deep space programs including Artemis 1 (Space Launch System).

He was Elected as a Fellow of Royal Aeronautical Society (RAeS) and also an elected member of the European Academy of Sciences and Arts.

Sonwane was the principal investigator at Masten Space Systems for NASA Lunar lander related technologies.

== Early life and education ==
Sonwane graduated with a Bachelor of Science in chemical engineering from the Institute of Chemical Technology, Mumbai. In 1996, he received Master of Science in chemical engineering from the Indian Institute of Technology, Mumbai, India. He completed a PhD in chemical engineering from the University of Queensland in 2000.

== Patents and publications ==
Chandrashkhar has various patents and publications to his credit. Below is the list of few.

- Injector mixer for a compact gasification reactor system, March 2018, Gas Technology Institute, Inventors: Chandrashekhar Sonwane, Kenneth M. Sprouse
- Gas generator and process therefor, April 2016, Aerojet Rocketdyne, Inventors: Stephen Yows, Chandrashekhar Sonwane
- Flow splitter for a compact gasification reactor system, May 2011, Aerojet Rocketdyne, Inventors: Chandrashekhar Sonwane, Kenneth M. Sprouse
- Recuperative supercritical carbon dioxide cycle, December 2011, Aerojet Rocketdyne, Inventors: Chandrashekhar Sonwane, Kenneth M. Sprouse, Ganesan Subbaraman, George M. O'Connor, Gregory A. Johnson
- Pump apparatus including deconsolidator, July 2012, Aerojet Rocketdyne, Inventors: Chandrashekhar Sonwane, Timothy Saunders, Mark Andrew Fitzsimmons
- Fundamental Studies in Nanoporpous and Mesoporous Materials, 2000, The University of Queensland

== Awards and honors ==
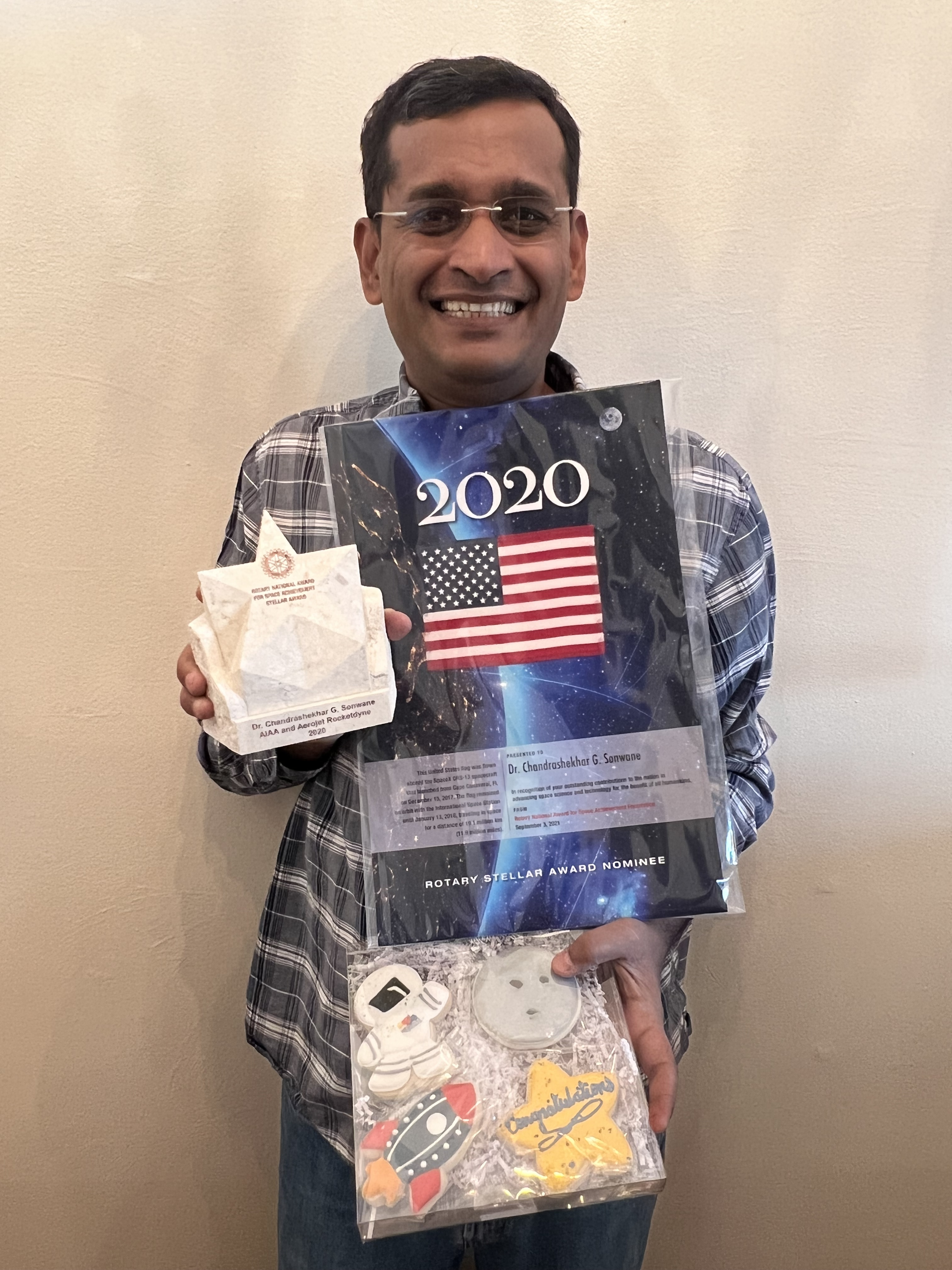
Sonwane with RNASA Stellar award in 2022

- 2020 Stellar Award - Rotary National Award for Space Achievement
- Outstanding Section award for very large first place Los Angeles-Las Vegas
