= Maruti Temples, Maharashtra =

Temples in Maharashtra, India

Eleven Maruti or God Hanuman temples were established by Samarth Ramdas in Maharashtra, India in the 17th century. The goal was to create awareness of fitness among Maharashtra youth so that they could participate in establishing the Maratha Empire started by Shivaji.

== Temples ==
The temples are:

- Shahapur, near Karad (Established in 1644)
- Masur (Established in 1645)
- Chaphal Vir Maruti Temple, near Satara (Established in 1648)
- Chaphal Das Maruti Temple, near Satara (Established in 1648)
- Shinganwadi, near Satara (Established in 1649)
- Umbraj, near Masur (Established in 1649)
- Majgaon, near Satara (Established in 1649)
- Bahe, near Sangli (Established in 1651)
- Manapadale, near Kolhapur (Established in 1651)
- Pargaon, near Panhala (Established in 1651)
- Shirsala (Established in 1654)

The temple idols are originals from the 17th century. The temples have been renovated. Some of the temples are dilapidated or derelict.
