= Devang Vipin Khakhar =

Indian chemical engineer

- Born: 7 April 1959 (age 67); Mumbai, Maharashtra, India
- Education: IIT Delhi; University of Massachusetts Amherst
- Known for: Studies on polymerization
- Awards: 1993 IIChE Amar Dyechem Award; 1997 Shanti Swarup Bhatnagar Prize; 1999 IIChE Herdillia Award; 2000 ISCA Millennium Plaque of Honor; 2001 IITB Excellence in Teaching Award; 2004 MRSI Medal; 2004 IITB H. H. Mathur Award; 2005 IITB Indira Manudhane Best PG Teacher Award
- Scientific career
- Fields: Polymer science
- Workplaces: IIT Bombay
- Doctoral advisor: Julio Ottino

Devang Vipin Khakhar (born 1959) is an Indian chemical engineer and the former director of the Indian Institute of Technology Bombay. He is known for his pioneering researches on polymerization and is an elected fellow of all the three major Indian science academies viz. Indian Academy of Sciences, Indian National Science Academy and National Academy of Sciences, India as well as Indian National Academy of Engineering. The Council of Scientific and Industrial Research, the apex agency of the Government of India for scientific research, awarded him the Shanti Swarup Bhatnagar Prize for Science and Technology, one of the highest Indian science awards for his contributions to Engineering Sciences in 1997. (Note: Long link - please select award year to see details)

== Biography ==
D. V. Khakhar, born on 7 April 1959 in Mumbai in the Indian state of Maharashtra, graduated in engineering (BTech) from the Indian Institute of Technology, Delhi in 1981 and moved to the US to the University of Massachusetts, Amherst from where he secured a PhD in 1986 working on Fluid mechanics of laminar mixing: dispersion and chaotic flows under the guidance of Professor Julio M. Ottino. He returned to India to join the Indian Institute of Technology, Bombay (IITB) as a member of faculty in 1987 where he is a professor at the Department of Chemical Engineering. At IITB, he served as the Professor-in-Charge of Continuing Education Program (2001–02), as the Head of the Department of Chemical Engineering (2002–04), and as the Dean of Faculty Affairs (2005–08). In 2009, he was appointed as the director of the institute and on expiry of the first term, he was retained for a second term in 2014 and served till 2019.

Khakhar is known to have done researches on polymerization of rod-like molecules and his work is reported to have assisted in a wider understanding of the discipline of polymerization. He has documented his researches in several articles; (Note: Please see Selected bibliography section) Google Scholar and ResearchGate, online repositories of scientific articles, have listed 129 and 134 of them. He has guided many master's and doctoral scholars in their studies and holds three patents for his work. viz. Method for improving particulate mixing and heat transfer in tumbling mixers and rotary kiln, Polyurethane Foam−Clay Nanocomposites: Nanoclays as Cell Openers, and Reticulated Vitreous Carbon Controlled Pore Size and Enhanced Electrical Conductivity. On the academic administration front, during his tenure as the director of IIT Bombay, the faculty strength of institute recorded a 25 percent increase and three new centres viz. National Centre for Aerospace Innovations and Research, Centre for Climate Change Research, and the Centre for Urban Science and Engineering were established. He is a member of the Science Advisory Council to the Cabinet (SAC-C) as well as the Science Advisory Council to the Prime Minister of India (SAC-PM) and is a former member of Indian Oil Corporation and the Atomic Energy Regulatory Board (AERB) and the Central Advisory Board of Education (CABE). He is an independent director of the Antrix Corporation, a director of Iit Bombay Development And Relations Foundation Company and has sat in the boards of the Indian Institute of Chemical Engineers and Materials Research Society of India. He is also associated with science journals and is an advisory board member of Advanced Powder Technology journal of Elsevier.

Khakhar is married to Natasha Patel and the couple has two children, Arjun and Aditi. The family lives in Powai, Mumbai.

== Awards and honors ==
Khakhar received the Amar Dyechem Award of the Indian Institute of Chemical Engineers in 1993; IIChE would honor him again in 1999 with the Herdillia Award. In between, the Council of Scientific and Industrial Research awarded him the Shanti Swarup Bhatnagar Prize, one of the highest Indian science awards in 1997. He received the Millennium Plaque of Honour of the Indian Science Congress Association in 2000, followed by the Excellence in Teaching Award of the IIT Bombay in 2001. The Materials Research Society of India awarded him the MRSI Medal in 2004, the same year as he received the H. H. Mathur Award for Applied Sciences of IIT Bombay. He received another honor from IIT Bombay the next year in the form of 2005 Indira Manudhane Best PG Teacher Award.

The Indian Academy of Sciences elected Khakhar as a fellow in 1996 and two years later, he was selected for the 1998 Swarnajayanti Fellowship by the Department of Science and Technology. He became a fellow of the Indian National Academy of Engineering in 2001 and Indian National Science Academy and the National Academy of Sciences, India followed suit in 2003 and 2009 respectively. The award orations delivered by Khakhar include the 1999 Prof. N. R. Kamath & Mrs. Ruzena Kamath Memorial Lecture of the Indian Plastics Institute and the 2010 Prof. N. R. Kamath Memorial Lecture of the Colour Society.

== Selected bibliography ==
- G. Harikrishnan, T. Umasankar Patro, D. V. Khakhar (2006). "Polyurethane Foam−Clay Nanocomposites: Nanoclays as Cell Openers". Ind. Eng. Chem. Res. 45 (21): 7126–7134. doi:10.1021/ie0600994.
- Ameya Agge, Sumeet Jain, D. V. Khakhar (2000). "Acceleration of the Polymerization of Rodlike Molecules by Flow". Journal of the American Chemical Society. 122 (44): 10910–10913. doi:10.1021/ja001541r.
- Arup Nandi, D. V. Khakhar, Anurag Mehra (2001). "Coalescence in Surfactant-Stabilized Emulsions Subjected to Shear Flow". Langmuir. 17 (9): 2647–2655. doi:10.1021/la001473m.
- G. Pulla Reddy, D. K. Chokappa, V. M. Naik, D. V. Khakhar (1998). "Structure Formation in Suspensions with a Liquid Crystalline Medium: Percolation Phenomena". Langmuir. 14 (9): 2541–2547. doi:10.1021/la970558t.
- U. S. Agarwal, D. V. Khakhar (1993). "Shear flow induced orientation development during homogeneous solution polymerization of rigid rodlike molecules". Macromolecules. 26 (15): 3960–3965. Bibcode:1993MaMol..26.3960A. doi:10.1021/ma00067a035.

== See also ==
- Nanocomposite
- Heat transfer
