= Kinshuk Dasgupta =

Indian research scientist (born 1977)

- Born: 12 April 1977 (age 49); Bally, Howrah, West Bengal, India
- Education: Institute of Chemical Technology; Jadavpur University
- Awards: Shanti Swarup Bhatnagar Prize for Science and Technology (2020); VASVIK Industrial Research Award (2020)
- Scientific career
- Fields: Material engineering
- Workplaces: Bhabha Atomic Research Centre

Kinshuk Dasgupta is an Indian, currently holding a post of Distinguished Professor at the Institute of Chemical Technology, Mumbai. Previously, he was working as a Scientist in the Bhabha Atomic Research Centre. He also held a professorship at the Homi Bhabha National Institute. He earned his Bachelor in Engineering from Jadavpur University in metallurgy and PhD from the Institute of Chemical Technology, Mumbai in chemical engineering. His research expertise mainly includes work on carbon based nano materials and composites with the use of nano materials.

== Awards and honors ==
Dasgupta is the winner of the Shanti Swarup Bhatnagar prize in Engineering Sciences (2020) for the development of light-weight bullet-proof jacket Bhabha Kavach. He has also received VASVIK Industrials Research Award in Materials Engineering for the year 2020. He has also been a Fulbright Visiting Scholar during 2018–2019 at University of Cincinnati.

== Selected bibliography ==
=== Articles ===
- Bisht, Ankita; Dasgupta, Kinshuk; Lahiri, Debrupa (November 2019). "Investigating the role of 3D network of carbon nanofillers in improving the mechanical properties of carbon fiber epoxy laminated composite". Composites Part A: Applied Science and Manufacturing. 126 105601. doi:10.1016/j.compositesa.2019.105601. ISSN 1359-835X. S2CID 202216948.
- Das, Tapas; Banerjee, Seemita; Dasgupta, Kinshuk; Joshi, J. B.; Sudarsan, V. (2015). "Nature of the Pd–CNT interaction in Pd nanoparticles dispersed on multi-walled carbon nanotubes and its implications in hydrogen storage properties". RSC Advances. 5 (52): 41468–41474. Bibcode:2015RSCAd...541468D. doi:10.1039/C5RA03508B.
- Dasgupta, Kinshuk; Joshi, Jyeshtharaj B.; Banerjee, Srikumar (July 2011). "Fluidized bed synthesis of carbon nanotubes – A review". Chemical Engineering Journal. 171 (3): 841–869. doi:10.1016/j.cej.2011.05.038. In 2021, Dasgupta became a laureate of the Asian Scientist 100 by the Asian Scientist.

=== Book chapter ===
- Sharma, Raghunandan; Ravikumar, N. L.; Dasgupta, Kinshuk; Chakravartty, J. K.; K. Kar, Kamal (14 October 2016). Composite Materials: Processing, Applications, Characterizations. Springer. ISBN 978-3-662-49514-8.
