= Institute of Chemical Technology =

Public deemed university in Mumbai, India

- Rasāyan tantrajñāna sansthā
- Former names: University Department of Chemical Technology (UDCT); University Institute of Chemical Technology (UICT)
- Motto: Karmanyewadhikaraste
- Type: Government aided university
- Established: 1 October 1933; 93 years ago
- Chancellor: Jyeshtharaj Joshi
- Vice-Chancellor: Aniruddha B. Pandit
- Academic staff: 108 (2020)
- Administrative staff: 240 (2020)
- Undergraduates: 1100 (2020)
- Postgraduates: 556 (2020)
- Doctoral students: 640 (2020)
- Location: Nathalal Parekh Marg, Matunga, Mumbai, Maharashtra, 400019, India; 19.02401°N 72.85852°E
- Campus: Urban, (16 acres)
- Website: www.ictmumbai.edu.in

Institute of Chemical Technology (ICT) is a public deemed university in Mumbai, India. It is focused on training and research in the fields of chemical engineering, chemical technology, and pharmaceutical sciences.

Established in 1933, the institute was granted deemed university status in 2008, making it the only state-funded deemed university in India. In 2018, ICT was named an institute with a special status per the Empowered Expert Committee and was given the status of Category 1 institute with graded autonomy by the Ministry of Human Resource Development and the University Grants Commission (India).

The institute also has regional campuses at Bhubaneswar, Odisha and Jalna, Maharashtra.

== History ==
=== Founding ===
In 1921, the Sir M. Visvesvaraya Committee recommended an institution of the Faculty of Technology at University of Mumbai and a college of technology in Bombay. In 1930, Kanaiyalal Maneklal Munshi's motion in the Academic Council for the institution of a Department of Chemical Technology was accepted. In 1932, Schemes for two-year post-B.Sc. courses in Textile Chemistry and in Chemical Engineering leading to a B.Sc. (Tech) degree and the subsequent M.Sc. (Tech) and Ph.D. (Tech) degrees by research were approved.

The ICT was founded on 1 October 1933, as University Department of Chemical and Technology (UDCT) of the University of Mumbai by then vice chancellor Sir Vitthal N. Chandavarkar. Since he was also the Chairman of Mill Owners' Association, Chandavarkar was keen on catering to the needs of Mumbai's bustling textile industry. The institute offered admissions to 15 students in 2 two-year post-B.Sc. degree courses, B.Sc. (Tech) in Textile Chemistry and B.Sc. (Tech) in Chemical Engineering. These courses were started in the then Royal Institute of Science, Fort, Mumbai (now renamed as The Institute of Science, Mumbai), since the department's own building had not begun construction. Robert B. Forster of the University of Leeds became a Professor of Chemical Technology and the first Head of the Department on 26 October 1933. Krishnasami Venkataraman became the first Indian director of the institute on 8 November 1938. The first Ph.D. (Tech) and Ph.D. (Sci) degrees were awarded by the department in 1940 and 1941, respectively. The foundation stone for the department's own building was laid in Matunga, Mumbai on 17 March 1941.

=== Expansion ===
The current campus in Matunga was occupied in June 1943. In 1944, other specializations: Pharmaceuticals and Fine Chemicals; Chemistry of Food and Drugs; Technology of Intermediates and Dyes; Technology of Oils, Fats and Waxes; and Technology of Plastics, Paints and Varnishes were added to the B. Sc. (Tech) course. In 1948, B.Sc. (Tech) (Technology of Plastics) and B.Sc. (Tech.) (Technology of Paints, Pigments, and Varnishes) replaced the B.Sc. (Tech) (Technology of Plastics, Paints and Varnishes). In 1949, the B.Sc. (Tech) course in the Chemistry of Foods and Drugs re-designated as Technology of Foods. In 1951, the four-year Post-lnterscience course, B.Chem.Engg. course replaced the earlier B.Sc. (Tech) course in Chemical Engineering and the intake was increased from 15 to 20. In 1958, the number of seats for the B.Chem.Enng course were further increased to 60. The Departments of Chemistry and General Engineering were started in 1952. The first female student was awarded a Ph.D. (Tech) in 1957. A three-year Bachelors of Pharmacy (B.Pharm) course was launched in 1958, becoming the first course of its kind in the state of Maharashtra. In 1960, ICT celebrated its Silver Jubilee, and the occasion was graced by then Prime Minister of India, Jawaharlal Nehru. In 1984, a four-year B.Pharm course replaced the earlier three-year course. In 2001, four year B.Tech courses replaced all B.Sc. (Tech) courses.

=== Autonomy ===
The university received partial autonomy from University of Mumbai in 1985 and was conferred the autonomous status on the UDCT in 1994, with concurrence from the Maharashtra State Government and the UGC. UDCT was renamed as the Mumbai University Institute of Chemical Technology (Autonomous) (MUICT) on 26 January 2002. In June 2004, in accordance with the Technical Education Quality Improvement Program (TEQIP) of the Government of India, under which the institute was selected as a Lead Institution, the Government of Maharashtra granted complete autonomy to the institute. On 12 September 2008, it was granted the deemed university status and renamed as the Institute of Chemical Technology. In 2008, the DBT-ICT Centre for Energy Biosciences was also inaugurated with support from the Department of Biotechnology of the Government of India.

Institute of Chemical Technology was the first institute to be granted the elite badge by the government of the state of Maharashtra. This along with the centre of excellence status put the institute on a par with other reputable schools such as the Indian Institutes of Technology, Indian Institute of Science and the Indian Institutes of Science Education and Research. It also makes the institute, eligible for various special grants from the union and the state governments. In November 2019, Aniruddha B. Pandit, a senior professor and a dean at the institute took charge of the post of Vice Chancellor, succeeding long time director Ganpati D. Yadav. In July 2024, Jyeshtharaj Bhalchandra Joshi was appointed as the Chancellor of the institute, succeeding Raghunath Anant Mashelkar, who held the position for two decades.

ICT was granted deemed university status in 2008, making it the only state-funded deemed university in India. On 12 February 2018 it was given the status of Category 1 institute with graded autonomy by the Ministry of Human Resource Development and the University Grants Commission (India). It is also an institute with a special status per the Empowered Expert Committee in 2018.

In 2025, alumnus Mukesh Ambani announced an unrestricted gift of ₹151 crore (equivalent to US$16.7 million) to the institute. This gift was announced during the release of biography of Man Mohan Sharma, the influential former director of ICT.

== Campus ==
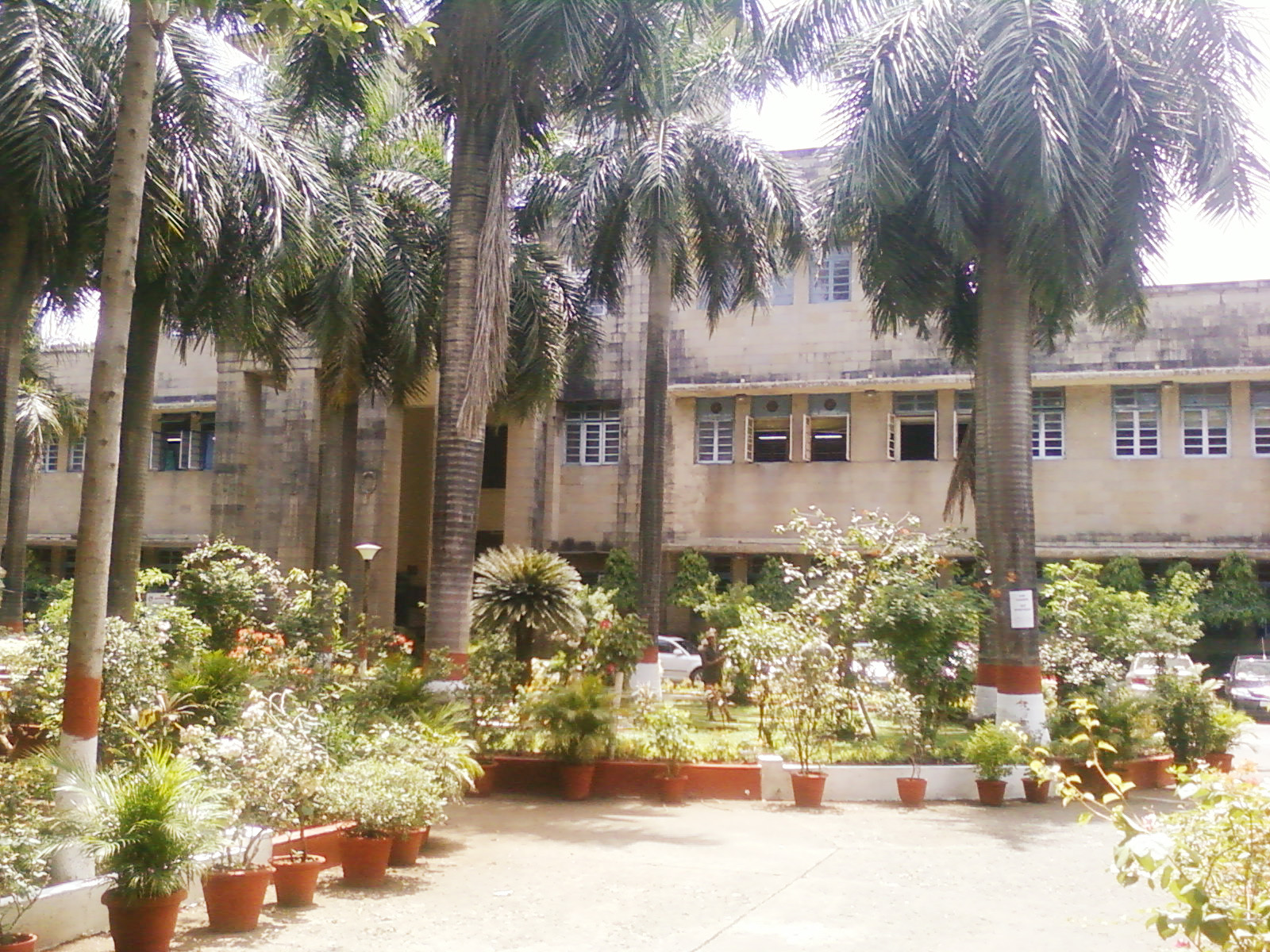
The facade of the main building of the Institute

ICT is located on a 16 acres (65,000 m^{2}) campus at 19.024°N 72.859°E. The academic building faces Nathalal Parekh Marg. Other buildings including two boy's hostels, two girl's hostels, faculty and staff apartments are located behind the academic building. The rear boundary of the institute runs along the Rafi Ahmed Kidwai Road. The institute is located opposite to Veermata Jijabai Technical Institute (VJTI).

=== Satellite campuses ===
Additional campuses are operational in Bhubaneswar, Odisha in collaboration with Indian Oil Corporation (IOC) and Indian Institute of Technology Kharagpur (IIT KGP) and another at Jalna, Maharashtra (Marathwada campus). The Bhubaneswar campus of ICT started its academic session on 3 September 2018 at the IIT Kharagpur extension centre. The Bhubaneswar campus was inaugurated initially by the Indian President Ram Nath Kovind on 18 March 2018 and the academic session was inaugurated by Dharmendra Pradhan, Union Minister for Petroleum and Natural Gas and Sanjiv Singh, Chairman of Indian Oil Corporation. A 203 acres Marathwada campus was established with a grant of ₹397 Crore by the state cabinet of Maharashtra. The foundation stone of the campus was laid on 4 May 2018 by then Chief Minister of Govt. of Maharashtra, Devendra Fadnavis along with others. Shashank T. Mhaske is the current Director of the ICT-Marathwada Campus, Jalna, and Ravindra V. Adivarekar is the current Director of the ICT-IOC Campus, Odisha.

=== Library ===
Established in 1934, the library was renamed Prof. M M Sharma Library on January 8, 1999. It functions as the central library of the institute and is one of the special collection libraries in the country. The library can boast of rich heritage collection of old classic books and bound volumes dating back to the 1930s. It has 38,200 books, 25,290 journals and 10,000 standards and subscribes to 120 international and 25 national journals. Along with the traditional collection, it also has a significant digital collection with access to more than 500 electronic journals as well as databases such as Reaxys, Sci-Finder, Scopus, and Web of science. It performs a dual role of an Academic Library as well as a Research Library, catering to both the in-house students and faculty, and outside technologists and industrialists. It is housed in a separate Ground Plus two-storied building. It is a unique library in India to have its own endowment fund. The library is also a member of E-ShodhSindhu Consortium. It has MOU with BONET for participating in exchange program devised by MISSAT, DST, New Delhi.

== Academics ==
ICT offers three degrees at undergraduate level: B.Tech. (Bachelor of Technology), B.Chem.Eng. (Bachelor of Chemical Engineering), B.Pharm. (Bachelor of Pharmacy). The institute offers several courses at the masters level which specialize in Chemical Technology, Chemical Engineering, Pharmacy and general science courses. ICT is accredited by AICTE, NAAC, NBA, NIRF. The off campuses of ICT at Bhubaneswar and Jalna also provide a 5-year Integrated M.Tech. in Chemical Engineering course as Majors and some additional branches as Minors, which is one of a kind in India as it consists of a trimester based system with alternate academic and industry trimesters. The Bhubaneswar Campus has also started an Executive M.Tech. programme which is a joint degree programme of ICT Mumbai and IIT Kharagpur making it the first state public university to provide a joint degree with an IIT in the country.

=== Faculty and Student Support ===
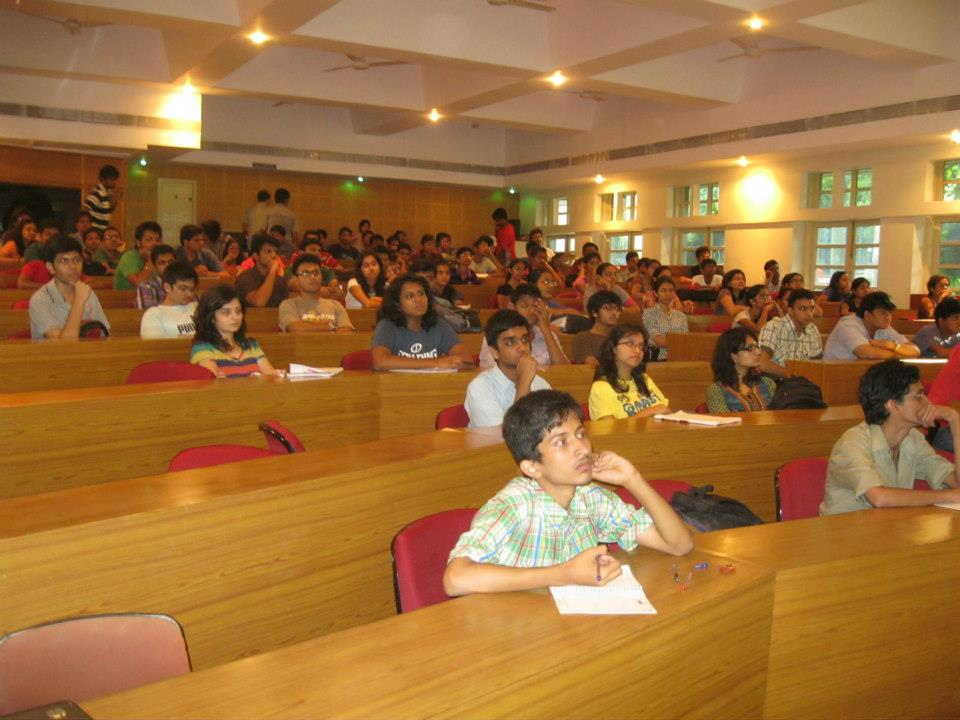
K. Venkataraman Auditorium at ICT

The ICT has sanctioned positions of 108 faculty (29 Professors, 38 Associate Professors and 41 Assistant Professors) and a support staff of 240. There are 114 visiting faculties (who typically are industry researchers), 7 emeritus faculties, and 4 adjuncts. The ICT has a tradition of establishment of endowments with an objective of supporting faculty positions, foreign travel assistance, merit-cum-means scholarships, staff welfare, library, campus development, research fellowships and seed money for research by young faculty. There are 90 faculty endowments in the institute. All these endowments have been established through generous donations by alumni, industries, philanthropists and well wishers. Only part of the interest (up to 50-70%) is used towards the purpose of the endowment and the remaining is invested back into the corpus. There are 22 endowment chairs, as well as 49 visiting fellowships which helps attract the best professionals to the institute from all over the world who interact with UG and PG students, faculty and alumni. The honoraria range from ₹ 5000 to 1.25 lakhs for a period of one day to 15 days. Some eminent faculty from institutes such as MIT, Purdue, Cambridge, Monash, UC Berkeley, UCSB, Montreal have taught UG and PG courses in ICT under these endowments. These lectures will form part of audit courses for research students. Besides, public lectures are organized under each endowment. Each academic year, 251 students are supported through under merit-cum-means scholarships. The range is ₹3000-75,000 per year per person through several endowments, private trust and annual commitments by alumni. All economically deprived students are given assistance in the form of tuition fees, hostel fees, mess bills and travel assistance to present papers in national conferences.

=== Fellows of Royal Society ===
Till date ICT has produced three Fellows of Royal Society- Man Mohan Sharma, Raghunath Anant Mashelkar. G. D. Yadav, former Vice Chancellor of ICT, Bhalchandra Bhanage, Head of Department of Chemistry and Anant Kapdi, Assistant Professor in the Department of Chemistry, were bestowed with Fellowship of Royal Society of Chemistry.

=== Rankings ===
University rankings

General – international
- QS (Asia) (2024): 251–260
- Times (World) (2024): 801–1000
- Times (Asia) (2024): 188
- Times (Emerging) (2022): 153

General – India
- NIRF (Overall) (2024): 56
- NIRF (Research) (2024): 40
- NIRF (Universities) (2024): 35

Engineering – India
- NIRF (2024): 41

Pharmacy – India
- NIRF (2024): 5

Internationally, Institute of Chemical Technology was ranked 251–260 in Asia on the QS World University Rankings of 2024 and has been ranked 5th according to the NIRF rankings in Pharmacy Category in the year 2024. It was ranked 801–1000 in the world by the Times Higher Education World University Rankings of 2024, 188 in Asia in 2023 and 153 among emerging economies.

It was ranked first among the public universities in the Atal Ranking of Institutions on Innovation Achievements (ARIIA) rankings in 2020. In 2021, the National Assessment and Accreditation Council (NAAC) ranked ICT among the top 3 institutes in Maharashtra alongside Tata Institute of Social Sciences (TISS) and Tata Institute of Fundamental Research (TIFR).

== Research ==
The ICT has a strong research culture. In 2008-09 UGC report notices that the institute generated around ₹50 crores from external sources, which was 8 times the government support. Currently, ICT graduates 100 PhDs annually, which is about 10% of India's chemistry and engineering PhDs.

ICT has strong relationships with the industries and many government as well as industry-sponsored projects take shape in ICT. In 2011, the Ministry of Textiles sanctioned ICT as National Center of Excellence in Sportswear with a grant of ₹24.5 crore for researching sports-related apparel and goods. With this, ICT has become the first institute in India to conduct research on sports fabrics. ICT hosts several research centers within the campus. These include DBT-ICT (Department of Biotechnology) Center for Energy Biosciences, ICT-DAE (Department of Atomic Energy) Center for Chemical Engineering Education and Research, UGC Networking Resource Centre in Chemical Engineering, and Center for Green Technology.

ICT, Mumbai was recently awarded 60 crores from the Department of Science and Technology for establishing the Mumbai Biocluster which involves setting up a Good Manufacturing Practice (GMP) facility, enabling biologics development at an affordable cost. The biocluster will serve as an accelerator for startups, academia, MSMEs, and industries, providing state-of-the-art infrastructure and expertise for faster development of biopharmaceutical products. With a focus on monoclonal antibodies, vaccines, mRNA technology, and cell & gene therapy, the facility will address key challenges faced during technology scale-up and validation in the drug development phase.

=== Department of Chemical Engineering ===
The Department of Chemical Engineering has developed technologies that are used in industry. The research group of Aniruddha B. Pandit, the current Vice Chancellor developed a method for cleaning and disinfecting stagnant water bodies and industrial effluents from various industries using hydrodynamic cavitation.

Bhaskar N. Thorat, a Professor of Chemical Engineering is the winner of NOCIL Award for Excellence in Design and Development of Process Plant and Equipment. His guidance to the Mumbai police helped in diffusing a major gas leakage and saved many lives.

=== Department of Pharmaceutical Sciences and Technology ===
The department is working on developing newer therapeutics and novel systems to deliver drugs into the body and has successfully translated several technologies to the industry. The research group of Prajakta Dandekar is one of the very few labs in India working on developing the organ-on-a-chip technology that essentially mimics the functioning of various organs on a small chip, decreasing the reliance on animal testing. The group is also developing novel polymers for the delivery of siRNA into the body for gene therapy. The group has collaborated with an Indian 3D Bioprinting startup Avay Biosciences to 3D print skin tissue which can be used for the treatment of severe burns, and can also be used for toxicological screening of drugs. Her group is also currently working on developing various 3D-printed pharmaceutical dosage forms such as gummies and controlled-release tablets.

In 2013, Vandana Patravale from the department was awarded $100,000 from the Bill and Melinda Gates Foundation for the development of an eco-friendly nanovaccine for nasal immunization against brucellosis. The vaccine was successfully developed and an article on the same was published in 2020. The Patravale lab is also involved in the fabrication of drug-eluting stents in collaboration with Sahajanand Medical Technologies Private Limited. The technology developed by Patravale helped cut the cost of stents by 80%, and these stents are being marketed in over 60 countries worldwide.

The department was also successful in synthesizing the anti-viral drug Favipiravir for use against the SARS-CoV-2 in partnership with the company Lasa Supergenerics Ltd.

== Student life ==
=== Technological Association ===
Technological Association (TA), established in 1951, is an organization that conducts co-curricular and extra-curricular activities in ICT. TA is headed by institute's vice-chancellor, (as the President) with a senior professor as the Vice President. TA, a 30-member student body, organizes various activities including the intra- and inter-collegiate festivals and runs various clubs for the students. TA also looks after the student grievances and makes sure that the students at the institute are satisfied.

=== Entrepreneurship cell ===
ICT inaugurated its entrepreneurship cell in April 2013 with an inauguration lecture from Ashwin Dani (Founder of Asian Paints) and Yogesh Kothari (Founder of Alkyl Amines). A fellowship for visit to Korea was offered at the time of inauguration. The primary purpose behind the entrepreneurship cell was to accelerate the entrepreneurial culture at ICT. ICT also has international dignitaries visiting regularly for contributing to the research as well as guide students. Some of the international dignitaries include Ahmet Uzumcu, Director General of Organization for the Prohibition of Chemical Weapons. There are more than 500 first-generation entrepreneurs which have come up from alumni and from the portals of ICT.

=== Campus publications ===
==== The Bombay Technologist ====
The Bombay Technologist is the annual peer-reviewed journal of the institute, started in 1951. The journal publishes technical articles in the thrust areas of science and technology, written by undergraduate and graduate students of the institute. It is published by the Technological Association. The Bombay Technologist also supports partial travel and registration expenses of students presenting technical papers in India. With the Bombay Technologist Undergraduate Research Program (BTUGRP), ICT has developed the framework for an organized, official and widespread UG research ethic.

==== The Spirit ====
The Spirit is the official bimonthly cultural magazine-cum-newsletter of ICT. There are typically 5-6 issues a year. The newsletter highlights the achievements of students and alumni, has news and information about the institute, and is a platform for students to showcase their art and literary skills. The first issue was released in October 2006.

=== Hostels ===
Within the campus walls, four hostel buildings (2 girls' and 2 boys') cater to accommodation needs of 900 students. Hostel No. 1 (built 1951) and No. 5 (a 7-story building occupied in 2005) accommodate approximately 600 male students, while hostel No. 2 (built 1966) and No. 3 (built 1987) accommodate female students. The hostels area has faculty flats, dining halls, a canteen, a health clinic, gym, and play grounds. Appointed faculty wardens are responsible for managing hostel and are assisted by office staff and student staff.

=== Student festivals ===
Manzar is the cultural festival of the Institute of Chemical Technology organized by the Technological Association. It has completed 10 years since it first began in 2007, and 2019 saw the 13th edition of this festival. Every year, Manzar proudly hosts a variety of events in music, dance, literary arts and fine arts. The Dance and Fashion Show events are the most popular, with active participation of students from all over the city. Manzar has a social initiative called Awaaz, through which students are able to do their bit for all-round societal development and improvement of underprivileged lives. Apart from all this, Manzar also has the Cultural Night and the Popular Night. Many famous artists have performed on the Manzar stage, including Shaan, Arijit Singh, Farhan Akhtar Kailash Kher, Shankar–Ehsaan–Loy, Fire on Dawson, Raghu Dixit, Shalmali Kholgade, Sachin–Jigar, Niladri Kumar, Lucky Ali, and Armaan Malik. Apart from that, comedians such as Kenny Sebastian, and Biswa Kalyan Rath have also entertained the crowd during Manzar.

Sportsaga is the annual sports festival of the Institute of Chemical Technology, Mumbai organized by the Technological Association. It was established in 2005.

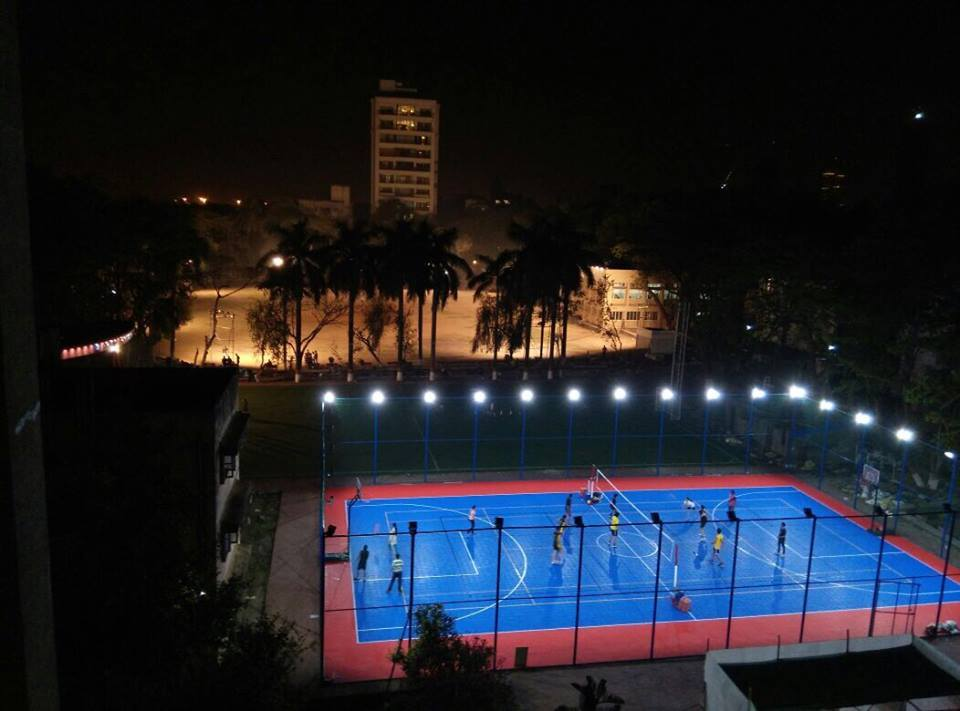
A game in progress at Pidilite Pavilion

In 2013, the Technological Association (Student Council) of ICT decided that Exergy would be merged with the other technical festivals of the institute, YICC (Young Innovators Choice Competition) and YRC (Young Researchers Competition). This led to the creation of Vortex – The Chemfest.

Rangotsav is a Conference on Advances in Polymer and Coating, Technical Festival of Polymer and Surface Coating Technology Department.

The division of Fibres and Textiles Processing annually holds Texpression, a cultural festival. Texpression also brings the alumni of the division together to foster camaraderie and network among them.

Rasayanam is the student-led chemistry festival organised by the department of chemistry.

== Notable alumni ==
The institute has produced many first-generation entrepreneurs and academics. Civilian honors awarded to alumni include 3 Padma Vibhushan, 8 Padma Bhushan and 10 Padma Shri awardees. Only two Indian engineers – Raghunath Mashelkar and Man Mohan Sharma - have been elected as Fellows of the Royal Society (FRS), both of whom are alumni of ICT.

Among the notable people who have attended or graduated from ICT are:

- Mukesh Ambani, Chairman of the Reliance Industries
- Pravin Kumar Arora, Associate Vice President at Sun Pharma
- Ashwin Dani, non-executive Vice Chairman of Asian Paints.
- Kinshuk Dasgupta, research scientist at BARC, Shanti Swaroop Bhatnagar prize winner
- Haren S. Gandhi, American inventor and engineer, recipient of the U.S. National Medal of Technology and Innovation
- Keki Hormusji Gharda, founder of Gharda Chemicals
- Nilesh Gupta, Managing Director of Lupin
- Lalita Iyer, journalist, writer and blogger
- Jyeshtharaj Joshi, nuclear scientist and chemical engineer, Padma Bhushan awardee, Shanti Swarup Bhatnagar prize-winner, former Director of ICT, Mumbai, current chancellor of ICT, Mumbai
- John Kapoor, founder and former CEO of Insys Therapeutics, convicted felon
- Amol Arvindrao Kulkarni, scientist at National Chemical Laboratory, Pune Shanti Swaroop Bhatnagar award winner.
- Ravindra Dattatray Kulkarni, vice chancellor of the University of Mumbai
- Ashish Kishore Lele, chemical engineer and Shanti Swarup Bhatnagar prize-winner, director of National Chemical Laboratory
- Raghunath Mashelkar, FRS, Padma Vibhushan, Padma Bhushan and Padma Shri awardee, former Director General of the Council of Scientific and Industrial Research, former chancellor of the ICT Mumbai, current chancellor of Jio Institute
- Samir Mitragotri, inventor, entrepreneur and researcher, professor at Harvard University
- Indravadan Modi, founder of Cadila Pharmaceuticals
- Ujwal Nirgudkar, technical advisor for Film Preservation, member of Academy Awards jury
- Anant Pai, comic artist, creator of Amar Chitra Katha and Tinkle comics
- Aniruddha B. Pandit, current Vice Chancellor, ICT Mumbai
- Madhukar Parekh, co-founder of Pidilite Industries
- A. V. Rama Rao, Padma Bhushan and Padma Shri awardee, former Director of Indian Institute of Chemical Technology, Managing Director of Avra Laboratories
- Doraiswami Ramkrishna, professor at Purdue University
- Vivek Ranade, chemical engineer, Shanti Swarup Bhatnagar Prize awardee
- Kallam Anji Reddy, Padma Bhushan and Padma Shri awardee, founder of Dr. Reddy's Laboratories
- Homi Sethna, nuclear scientist, Padma Vibhushan, Padma Bhushan and Padma Shri awardee, former chairman of the Atomic Energy Commission of India
- Manubhai Shah, former Cabinet Minister of Commerce, Government of India
- Man Mohan Sharma, FRS, renowned chemical engineer, Padma Vibhushan and Padma Bhushan awardee, Shanti Swarup Bhatnagar prize awardee, former Director of ICT Mumbai
- Narotam Sekhsaria, philanthropist, chairman of ACC Cement and Ambuja Cements
- Chandrashekhar Sonwane, Indian-American rocket scientist
- Srinivas, playback singer
- Shreehas Tambe, CEO and Managing Director of Biocon
- Bal Dattatreya Tilak, Padma Bhushan awardee, and director of National Chemical Laboratory, Pune
- Pramod P. Wangikar, Professor at Department of Chemical Engineering IIT Bombay, N-Bios winner
- G. D. Yadav, Padma Shri awardee, former Vice Chancellor, ICT Mumbai
