= Ujwal Nirgudkar =

Technical Advisor for Film Preservation

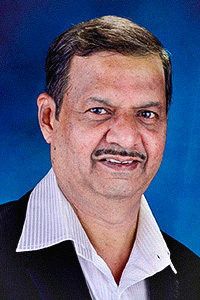
- Born: Vile Parle; Mumbai, India
- Education: Parle Tilak Vidyalaya; UDCT
- Occupations: Technical Advisor for National Film Heritage Mission; Chairman, SMPTE-India Section
- Spouse: Archana Ujwal Nirgudkar

Ujwal Nirgudkar is a Technical Advisor for India’s National Film Heritage Mission and a chemical engineer by training. He is a member of the Academy of Motion Picture Arts and Sciences, joining the Class of 2017. He is the first Indian to join the Academy as a member-at-large, having worked in the film industry for 36 years. He started his career at the Filmcenter Laboratory in Tardeo, Mumbai as a Technical Manager in May 1981. When the Filmcenter management closed operations in 2000, he joined Filmlab in Goregaon-East, Mumbai. He was initially appointed as General Technical Manager and took part in setting up a state-of-the-art film processing laboratory. He rose to the position of Technical Director on the Filmlab board of directors in July 2007.

From 2007 to 2014, he was also a global consultant to the Fortune-500 MNC Akzo Nobel in the Netherlands where he promoted green technology for film processing around the world. Ujwal left Filmlab in May 2016 to join KPMG as a consultant. He currently works as the technical advisor for the National Film Heritage Mission, a media conservation project launched by the National Film Archive of India.

== Early and personal life ==
Nirgudkar was born in Vile Parle, Mumbai. He is an alumnus of Parle Tilak Vidyalaya in Parle, Mumbai. He later attended the University Department of Chemical Technology (now the Institute of Chemical Technology), where he received his bachelor's degree in chemical engineering. He also received a diploma in business management from the Indian Merchants Chambers.

He is married to Archana Ujwal Nirgudkar, a manager at the Reserve Bank of India in Mumbai. The couple have two daughters.

== Career ==
He started his career at the Filmcenter Laboratory in Tardeo as a technical manager in May 1981. When Filmcenter stopped operations in March 2000, he joined ‘Filmlab’ in Goregaon-East Mumbai, started by a faction of the same group. He was initially appointed as General Manager-Technical and helped set up a state of the art film processing laboratory. He was elevated to a Filmlab Board position as 'Technical Director’ in July 2007. He left Filmlab in May 2016 to join KPMG as a consultant and is currently a technical adviser for the ‘National Film Heritage Mission’, a 600 Crore project under the National Film Archives, Information & Broadcasting Ministry in the Government of India.

He presented technical papers at the International Conference of the Society of Motion Picture & Television Engineers in October 1993, November 1999, and October 2002.

He was granted two U.S. patents for motion picture technology: U.S. Patent No, 6,849,366 granted on 1 February 2005, and U.S. Patent No, 7,254,324 granted on 7 August 2007.

== Achievements ==
- First Indian to get U.S. patents in film technology
- First Indian to get ‘Fellowship Award’ from the Society of Motion Picture & Television Engineers (SMPTE)
- Represented India on International Technical Committee of SMPTE for the last 10 years.
- First Indian to be appointed on board of directors by International Association of Cinema & Video Laboratories

== Business ==
The Indian Institute of Management, Ahmedabad helped Nirgudkar to float his own company called Alfa Imaging Systems Pvt. Ltd. in 2009 to promote his patented technology. This technology was noticed by Ernst & Young, London, and his company was selected for a global partnership program with the U.K. government. The UK Government helped him set up his company Alfa Pixel Technologies (UK) Ltd. in 2010 in Bristol, UK

In 2007 he was given the ‘Fellowship’ Award by SMPTE at the New York Conference. He is the first Indian to receive this award for his outstanding global contribution to motion picture technology.

(The Fellow Grade of membership is awarded to individuals who have, by proficiency and contributions, attained an outstanding rank among engineers or executives in the motion-picture, television or related industries worldwide). Nirgudkar established the India Section of the SMPTE in 2011 and is now its chairman. He pioneered the efforts to bring the SMPTE standard for ‘Digital Cinema’ into India.

He is currently chief technical advisor for the ‘National Film Heritage Mission’, a ₹600-core initiative to preserve the filmic heritage of India that was started in April 2016 by the Information and Broadcasting Ministry of the Government of India.

== Awards and recognition ==
=== Awards - ===
1. Maharashtra Govt. Award for Technical Excellence for being the first Indian to be granted a U.S. Patent in. Motion Picture Technology from Vilasrao Deshmukh Chief Minister of Maharashtra State, April 2005
2. Western India Cinematographers Association's (W.I.C.A.) Special Award for Contribution to Lab Processing Technology.
3. National Award for his patented technology by IIM Ahmedabad.
4. Marathi Vidyan Parishad Award for promoting non-polluting technology for film processing around the world.
5. Assocham Award for Best Film Restoration of Mrinal Sen's Film "Khandhar"
6. Distinguished Alumnus Award-Awarded by U.D.C.T., Mumbai University (Now I.C.T.) in Dec.2011 for Global contribution to the Motion Picture Technology.

=== Speaker at - ===
1. Society of Motion Picture & Television Engineers,(SMPTE) International Conferences, Los Angeles, New York & Pasadena, CA, US
2. Hollywood Post Alliance Conference (HPA) - Palm Springs, CA, US
3. Association of Cinema & Video Laboratories Conference (ACVL) – New York, Los Angeles & Mexico
4. Library of Congress, U.S. Government, Washington, D.C.
5. International Broadcast Conference (IBC), Amsterdam – 2013,
6. Keynote Speaker with Mr. Amitabh Bachchan – (100 Years of Indian Cinema).
7. Hollywood Goes Green Conference, Los Angeles.
8. Association of Moving Images Archives Conference (AMIA), Rochester NY and Georgia.
9. International Film Festivals, Goa, Kerala and Pune
10. Marathi Vidnyan Parishad, Golden Jubilee Conference, BARC, Mumbai
11. Participated in All India Radio and Doordarshan programs.

=== Oscar Academy Membership - 2017 ===
In keeping with its new diversity policy, the Academy selected several people from the Indian film industry to be on its selection jury, some as members from different crafts, and some as members-at-large, one of whom was Ujwal Nirgudkar.
