= Masur, India =

Masur
- Town
- Location in Maharashtra, India
- Coordinates: 17°24′0″N 74°9′0″E
- Country: India
- State: Maharashtra
- District: Satara

Population (2011)
  - Total: 12,000 Approx.

Languages
  - Official: Marathi
- Time zone: UTC+5:30 (IST)
- PIN: 415106
- Telephone code: 02164
- Vehicle registration: MH-50
- Coastline: 0 kilometres (0 mi)
- Nearest city: Karad
- Lok Sabha constituency: Satara
- Avg. summer temperature: 30 °C (86 °F)
- Avg. winter temperature: 20 °C (68 °F)

Masur is a small town located in Karad taluka of Satara district of Maharashtra in India, between Satara and Karad, seven kilometers from National Highway No. 4. It has a population of about 18,000.

== History ==
B.R.Ambedkar wrote about his childhood experience in Masur and the discrimination he and his siblings suffered, in his autobiographical book, Waiting for a Visa (chapter 1).

== See also ==
- Maruti Temples, Maharashtra
