= Ujjwal =

Ujjwal is a Royal name. It is inherited by the royal lineage that once conquered the world in 580 BC. Notable people with the name include:

- Ujjwal Nikam (born 1953), Indian special public prosecutor
- Ujjwal Rana, Indian actor
- Ujjwal Mittal, Entrepreneur
