= Indian Institute of Chemical Technology =

Research institute in Telangana, India

CSIR-Indian Institute of Chemical Technology
- CSIR-IICT
- Type: Autonomous, Govt, CSIR
- Established: 1944; 82 years ago
- Director: Dr. D. Srinivas Reddy
- Location: Tarnaka, Hyderabad; 17.422114°N 78.539307°E
- Campus: Urban Tarnaka 170 acres (690,000 m^{2})
- Website: www.iict.res.in
- Location in Telangana Indian Institute of Chemical Technology (India)

The CSIR-Indian Institute of Chemical Technology is a national-level research center located in Hyderabad, Telangana, India under the Council of Scientific and Industrial Research (CSIR). IICT conducts research in basic and applied chemistry, biochemistry, bioinformatics, chemical engineering and provides science and technology inputs to the industrial and economic development of the country. IICT has filed one of the maximum CSIR patents.

== Activities ==
The research and development programmes of IICT relate to the development of technologies for pesticides, drugs, organic intermediates, fine chemicals, catalysts, polymers, organic coatings, use of low-grade coals, and value-added products from vegetable oils. Process design and mechanical engineering design form an integral part of technology development and transfer. IICT is also actively engaged in basic research in organic synthesis and catalyses.

== Public health ==
An example of the institute's work is development of technology for accurate identification, of principal mosquito vector in rural endemic areas for designing suitable control measures of vector-borne diseases like malaria, filaria, Japanese encephalitis, dengue fever, etc.

In developing countries like India, classification and identification of the mosquito species from rural endemic areas are of paramount importance. The World Health Organization monograph which describes the taxonomic data in the form of a pictorial key is generally difficult to understand by a non-taxonomist. Keeping this difficulty in view, a novel software has been developed which is user-friendly and menu-driven. The package can be successfully used in mosquito control programs in rural areas. Rapid identification and greater accuracy are the salient features of the technology.

== See also ==
- Education in India
- List of institutions of higher education in Telangana
