= Man Mohan Sharma =

Indian chemical engineer (born 1937)

Professor Man Mohan Sharma FRS FREng
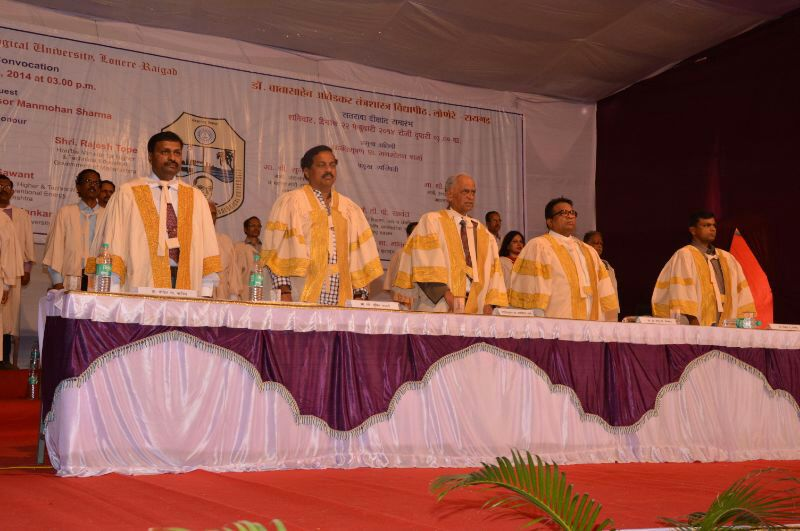
- Sharma (in the middle) at the convocation of Dr. Babasaheb Ambedkar Technological University.
- Born: 1 May 1937 (age 89); Jodhpur, Jodhpur State, British India
- Education: Institute of Chemical Technology (BSc, MSc); Cambridge University (Phd)
- Awards: • Padma Vibhushan (2001) • Padma Bhushan (1987) • Leverhulme Medal (1996) • Shanti Swarup Bhatnagar Prize (1973)
- Scientific career
- Fields: Chemical Engineering
- Workplaces: Institute of Chemical Technology

Man Mohan Sharma (born 1 May 1937) is an Indian chemical engineer. He was educated at Jodhpur, Mumbai, and Cambridge. At age 27, he was appointed Professor of Chemical Engineering in the Institute of Chemical Technology, Mumbai. He later went on to become the Director of UDCT, the first chemical engineering professor to do so from UDCT.

In 1990, he became the first Indian engineer to be elected as a Fellow of Royal Society, UK. He was awarded the Padma Bhushan (1987) and the Padma Vibhushan (2001) by the President of India. He has also been awarded the Leverhulme Medal of the Royal Society, the S.S. Bhatnagar Prize in Engineering Sciences (1973), FICCI Award (1981), the Vishwakarma medal of the Indian National Science Academy (1985), G.M. Modi Award (1991), Meghnad Saha Medal (1994), and an honorary Doctor of Science degree from Indian Institute of Technology, Delhi (2001).

== Education ==
Sharma obtained Bachelor of Chemical Engineering (1958) from UDCT and subsequently MSc (Tech) in 1960. He obtained PhD (Chemical Engineering) (1964) at Cambridge University with Peter Danckwerts. In 1964, he returned to India as Professor at the University of Bombay, and later became Director of the University Department of Chemical Technology (UDCT) (now the Institute of Chemical Technology). He served as Professor for 33 years at UDCT, along with 8 years as Director of this institute.

== Academic career ==
Sharma made contributions to chemical engineering science and technology. His studies on Bronsted based catalysis in CO_{2} hydration (published in the Transactions of Faraday Society) and subsequently kinetics of COS absorption in aqueous amines and alkanolamines brought out linear free energy relationship between CO_{2} and COS absorption in solutions of amines and alkanolamines. He has contributed extensively on the role of microphases in multiple reactions which he pioneered. He also became an independent Editor of Chemical Engineering Science at a young age. He taught different subjects in chemical engineering and encouraged his doctoral students, from the very beginning, to publish independently their work in renowned journals.

Under his stewardship, UDCT was granted autonomy by the UGC and the Institute increased the number of PhD graduates.

== Biography ==
In June 2025, a biographical book titled Divine Scientist was published, chronicling the life and contributions of Man Mohan Sharma. The book, authored by Anita Patil and published by Sundaram Digital Publication House, highlights Prof. Sharma's academic journey, pioneering research in chemical engineering, and his role in shaping scientific education in India. The biography was launched at the Institute of Chemical Technology (ICT), Mumbai, where he served as Director for many years.

The biography, written by Anita Patil, has also been translated into Marathi (Gurunam Guruhu) by Soniya Khare, expanding its accessibility to regional readers. During this book launch ceremony, his former student Mukesh Ambani announced an unrestricted gift of ₹151 crore (equivalent to US$16.7 million) to the Institute of Chemical Technology to honor Sharma.

== Awards ==
Sharma is a recipient of a number of prestigious academic honours and awards including the 1977 Moulton Medal of the Institution of Chemical Engineers, and is himself commemorated in the M M Sharma Medal awarded by the same institution for outstanding research contributions.

He won the Leverhulme Medal of the Royal Society "for his work on the dynamics of multi-phase chemical reactions in industrial processes". He was awarded the Padma Vibhushan (in 2001), and Padma Bhushan (in 1987) by the President of India. He was INSA President (1989–90). He is a Fellow of the Indian Academy of Sciences, Bangalore, Honorary Fellow of the National Academy of Sciences (India), Allahabad, Fellow of the Royal Society, London. Subsequently, he was elected Honorary Fellow by the Royal Academy of Engineering and is Foreign Associate of the US National Academy of Engineering.

He has been honoured by several universities including IITs by honorary doctorates.
