= Indian Institute of Chemical Engineers =

- Founder: Hira Lal Roy
- Established: 18 May 1947
- President: Anil K. Saroha
- Location: Jadavpur University, Kolkata
- Website: www.iiche.org.in

The Indian Institute of Chemical Engineers (IIChE) is the professional body for chemical engineers in India. The headquarter of IIChE is in the campus of Jadavpur University, Kolkata. The organization has 42 regional centers along with 172 student chapters spread throughout India. The institution's membership comprises academics, professionals from the chemical industry, researchers, and students.

IIChE also publishes scientific journal "Indian Chemical Engineer", which is published in two sections – A and B. Section A provides an international platform for presenting original research work, interpretative reviews and discussions on new developments in the expansive areas of Chemical Engineering and its allied fields. The journal invites papers describing novel theories and practical applications, including reports of experimental work – carefully executed and soundly interpreted. Section B features technical articles or overview of technology with a view to guiding practicing chemical engineers, news snippets on research developments, industry updates, issues of environment and health hazards, etc. This section also offers in-house news for those associated with the institute.
