= L. K. Doraiswamy =

Indian-American chemical engineer, author and academic (1927–2012)

- Born: May 13, 1927; Bengaluru, India
- Died: June 2, 2012 (aged 85); Danville, Pennsylvania, USA
- Occupations: Chemical engineer Scientist; Writer
- Years active: 1948–2012
- Known for: Organic synthesis engineering
- Spouse: Rajalakshmi
- Parent(s): Laxmangudi Krishnamurthy; Kamala
- Awards: 1983 INSA Syed Hussain Zaheer Medal; 1986 Om Prakash Bhasin Award; 1987 Jawaharlal Nehru Lifetime Achievement Award; 1988 CE Personal Achievement Award; 1990 Padma Bhushan; 1990 AICE Richard H. Wilhelm Award; 2001 IIChE Padma Vibhushan Prof. M. M. Sharma Medal; 2003 IIChE Dr. B. P. Godrej Life Time Achievement Award; 2004 AICE William H. Walker Award; Homi Bhabha Medal

Laxmangudi Krishnamurthy Doraiswamy (1927–2012) was an Indian-American chemical engineer, author and academic, known for his contributions in developing Organic synthesis engineering as a modern science discipline. Chemical Engineering journal of McGraw Hill listed him among the 10 most distinguished chemical engineers in the world in 1988. He was the author of nine texts in chemical engineering, including Organic Synthesis Engineering, a 2001 publication which is known to have introduced the topic as a definitive scientific stream and Heterogeneous reactions: Analysis, Examples, and Reactor Design, reportedly the first comprehensive text in chemical engineering.

He was a recipient of honorary doctorate degrees from University of Salford, and University of Wisconsin, besides several other awards and honors which included Om Prakash Bhasin Award, Richard H. Wilhelm Award, William H. Walker Award and Homi Bhabha Medal. The Government of India awarded him the third highest civilian honour of the Padma Bhushan, in 1990, for his contributions to science.

== Early life ==
Laxmangudi Doraiswamy, born in Karnataka, did his schooling at Methodist Boys High School, Hyderabad before graduating in chemistry (BSc) from Nizam College, then under the University of Madras. Doraiswamy's English skills had prompted his school principal to advise him to take up literature as a career. He also wrote poetry but none of his poems were published. Choosing chemical engineering for his further education, he secured the degree of BS, in 1946, from Alagappa College of Technology, one of the only two Indian institutions offering chemical engineering for advanced studies at that time. His performance in the engineering examinations earned him a scholarship from the Government of Andhra Pradesh which helped him to pursue further studies at the University of Wisconsin and the twenty one-year old reached Wisconsin when the winter of 1948 was its peak in December. It was during his stay at the University of Wisconsin, he had the opportunity to meet Olaf Andreas Hougen, a known academic in chemistry and a later-day professor emeritus of Wisconsin University, After completing his master's degree in 1950, he continued at the university to secure his doctoral degree in chemical engineering in 1952 for which Hougen reportedly assisted him in getting permission from the Nizam government of Hyderabad, who wanted Doraiswamy to return to India to start serving the government. His doctoral thesis was on semichemical pulping, prepared under the supervision of Hougen and John McGovern of the Forest Products Laboratory, US Department of Agriculture.

== Academic and professional career ==
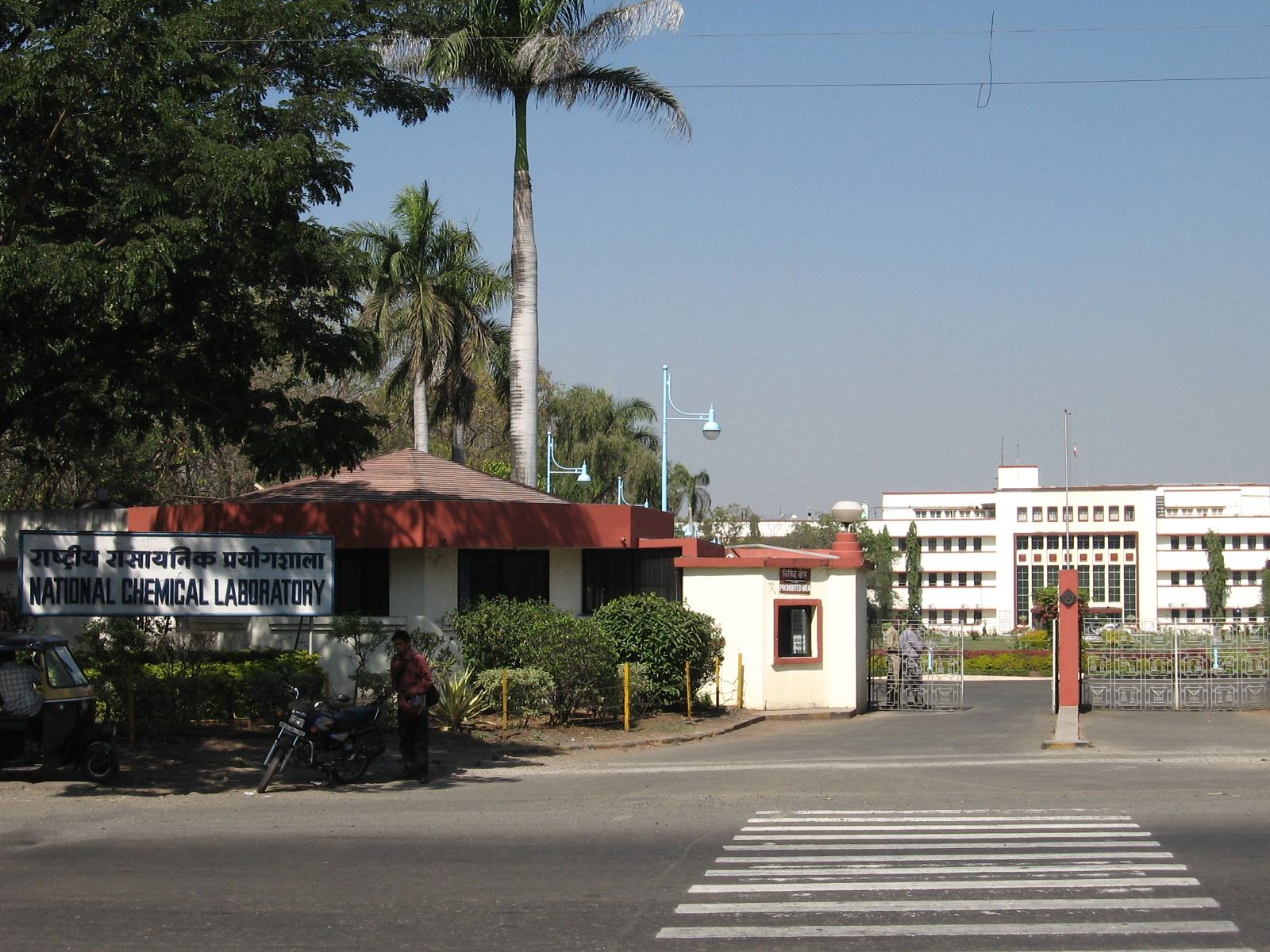
National Chemical Laboratory, Pune

Doraiswamy's career started at R. L. Carlisle Chemical and Manufacturing Company of Brooklyn for a short stint of two years and he left US for India in 1954 to take up the position of a scientist at the National Chemical Laboratory (NCL), Pune where he continued his researches in chemical engineering. His tenure at NCL lasted a quarter of a century, rising in ranks as a senior scientist, assistant director (1961), deputy director (1966) and superannuating in 1989, as the first non-chemist to head the organization, after holding the post of the director since 1978. In between, he was reportedly offered the post of the director general of the Council of Scientific and Industrial Research, the largest research and development (R&D) organisation in India, controlling 38 national laboratories, 39 outreach centres, 3 Innovation Complexes and 5 units, but he declined the offer to stay with NCL. It was at this time, NCL entered into a bilateral co-operation agreement with the department of chemical and biological engineering of the Iowa State University and this led to his visit to Iowa, where he met Peter Reilly, the then Anson Marston Distinguished Professor of the university. It is reported that Reilly persuaded Doraiswamy to join the university as the Glenn Murphy Visiting Professor of Engineering which he agreed to and, later, joined the institution as a permanent faculty in 1992 as the Herbert Stiles Professor. During his stay in Iowa, he was involved in various visiting lectures and symposia and became the Anson Marston Distinguished Professor, the highest academic honour for engineering academics at the university. He continued his association with the university even after his retirement in 2001 till his death 2012.

== Legacy ==
=== Academic contributions ===
In 2001, Doraiswamy published a seminal work, Organic Synthesis Engineering, which defined the subject and introduced it as an independent science discipline. The book emphasized on catalysis and the role of process intensification in enhancing overall productivity and explained the applications of catalysis in organic synthesis. This is reported to be a pioneering attempt in chemical reactions engineering and assisted in conjoining the disciplines of chemical and chemical engineering processes. Another of his work, Heterogeneous Reactions: Analysis, Examples, and Reactor Design, co-authored by M. M. Sharma, is considered as the first comprehensive text on chemical engineering. At NCL as well as at Iowa State University, he mentored 45 research scholars in their post graduate and doctoral studies. He was a visiting professor at six universities and sat at the editorial boards of many refereed journals like Indian Chemical Engineer, the official journal of the Journal of the Indian Institute of Chemical Engineers (IIChE). It was during his tenure as the head of NCL, a Centre of Excellence in Catalysis was established which eventually returned several scientific contributions. He headed the working group on Catalysis of the Indo-Russian Science and Technology Cooperation and was instrumental in NCL starting collaborative ventures with Salford University, UK and with the University of Erlangen, Germany.

=== Scientific contributions ===
Doraiswamy was known to have introduced several innovations in chemical reaction engineering. Gas-solid catalytic and non-catalytic reactions, solid-solid reactions, phase-transfer catalysis mediated reactions, stochastic modelling, fluidization, adsorption and catalysis and catalytic reactor analysis are some of the areas where his researches reportedly made improvements. He launched radical changes in the processing of dimethylaniline, chloromethanes, methylchlorosilanes, ethylenediamine and vitamin B6. He introduced a complete process for methyl, ethyl, butyl and 2-ethylhexylacrylates while the process initiated by him, jointly with G. D. Rihani in 1965 for calculating enthalpy, entropy and the Cp for an ideal gas is known as Rihani-Doraiswamy method. Verma-Doraiswamy method for the estimation of Standard enthalpy of formation is another process that bears his name. The invention jointly made with Thomas Wheelock of a calcium based sorbent for coal gas desulphurization, introduction of zeolite catalysts, the development of a xylene isomerization process and a new methodology for the alkylation of benzene with alcohols are some of his other contributions. It was at the tissue culture pilot plant established by him where a method of propagation of bamboo by tissue culture was identified for the first time.

=== Publications ===
Doraiswamy, who reportedly had good English language skills, published nine books, five of them original works and four edited books, as well as over 180 scientific papers published in peer-reviewed national and international journals. These writings are known to have assisted in expanding the canvass of chemical engineering beyond its conventional boundaries by introducing themes such as phase transfer catalysis and sonochemical reactions. Apart from Organic Synthesis Engineering and Heterogeneous Reactions: Analysis, Examples, and Reactor Design, the other three books published by him are The Analysis of Chemically Reacting Systems : A Stochastic Approach (1987), Excellence in an Overlapping Culture: The Big History of India’s National Chemical Laboratory (2011) and Chemical Reaction Engineering : Beyond the Fundamentals (2014). The lectures delivered by Doraiswamy in the Hougen Lecture Series were compiled by the University of Wisconsin and published in 1988 under the title, Across Millennia : Some Thoughts on Ancient and Contemporary Science and Engineering. Frontiers in Chemical Reaction Engineering (1984), Transport processes in Fluidized Bed Reactors (1987), Recent Advances in the Engineering Analysis of Chemically Reacting Systems (1987), and Transport in Fluidized Particle Systems (1989) are the four books edited by him.

=== Social contributions ===
Doraiswamy was reported to have contributed in bringing order to various departments at NCL and in recruiting talents. As the head of the organization, he introduced the scheme of preferential recruitment of widows of the former NCL employees and established a local school and shopping centre in NCL campus.

== Awards and honors ==
Doraiswamy, an Anson Marston Distinguished Professor of the Iowa State University, was elected as the fellow of the Indian Academy of Sciences in 1974, and the Indian National Science Academy followed suit in 1977. He was also a fellow of The World Academy of Sciences (TWAS) (1997) and the National Academy of Sciences, India. The Chemical Engineering magazine of McGraw-Hill listed him among the 10 most distinguished chemical engineers in the world in 1988. He received the degree of Doctor of Science (honoris causa) from the University of Salford in 1982 and the University of Wisconsin Madison in 1991. In 2010, the National Academy of Engineering inducted him as a member.

The Indian National Science Academy awarded him the Syed Hussain Zaheer Medal in 1983 and he was awarded the Om Prakash Bhasin Award for Science and Technology of the Om Prakash Bhasin Foundation in 1986. He received the Jawaharlal Nehru Lifetime Achievement Award in 1987, followed by the Personal Achievement Award of Chemical Engineering magazine in 1988. The Government of India included him in the Republic Day Honours list for the civilian award of the Padma Bhushan in 1990, the same year as he received the Richard H. Wilhelm Award of the American Institute of Chemical Engineers. In 2001, he received the Padma Vibhushan Prof. M. M. Sharma Medal of the Indian Institute of Chemical Engineers (IIChE) and IIChE repeated the honor with Dr. B. P. Godrej Life Time Achievement Award in 2003. He received another award, the William H. Walker Award, for Excellence in Contributions to Chemical Engineering Literature from the American Institute of Chemical Engineers in 2004. He was also a recipient of the Homi Bhabha Medal.

On his 60th birthday, the Indian Academy of Sciences published one of their books, re-titled as Reactions and Reaction Engineering in Doraiswamy's honor. The American Institute of Chemical Engineers honored him on his 70th birthday by bringing out a collection of research papers under the nameL.K. Doraiswamy Festschrift. The Indian Institute of Chemical Engineers have instituted an annual oration, Padma Bhushan Prof. L. K. Doraiswamy Chemcon Distinguished Speaker Award, in his honor, running since 2001. Two of the institutions he was closely associated with, viz. Iowa State University and the National Chemical Laboratory, honor Doraiswamy by jointly organizing a US-India lectureship every year.

== Personal life ==
Doraiswamy was born in a Brahmin family as the only brother of three sisters born to Laxmangudi Krishnamurthy and Kamala in Bengaluru on 13 May 1927. Krishnamurthy was the head of Geological Survey of India at their Hyderabad branch and the young Doraiswamy was brought up in Lingasugur, a small hamlet near Hatti Gold Mines and home to many archaeological sites, in the south Indian state of Karnataka. He was married to Rajalakshmi, the marriage taking up place in 1952 after his return to India from Wisconsin, and the couple had a son, Deepak, a doctor in chemical engineering and a daughter, Sandhya, an MPhil and CPA holder. Both continue to live in Pennsylvania, Deepak at Landenberg and Sandhya at Danville. Doraiswamy, towards the later days of his life, suffered from heart ailments and underwent a bypass surgery. However, he could not survive for long and died on 2 June 2012, while recuperating from the surgical trauma, survived by his children; his wife had preceded him in death. Though the latter part of his life was spent mostly in US, he retained his Indian citizenship till the end. Dr Kallam Anji Reddy the founder of Dr Reddy's Laboratories obtained his Phd in Chemical Engineering from National Chemical Laboratory under supervision of Doraiswamy.

== See also ==
- National Chemical Laboratory
- Nizam College
- List of Iowa State University people
- List of University of Wisconsin–Madison people
