= Alagappa College of Technology =

Indian educational institution

- Other names: ACT, A C Tech
- Type: Public
- Established: 1944; 82 years ago
- Academic affiliations: Anna University
- Dean: Dr. S. Meenakshisundaram
- Location: Chennai, Tamil Nadu, India; 13.007906°N 80.238795°E
- Campus: Urban
- Website: Official website

Alagappa College of Technology is an educational institution located in Chennai, Tamil Nadu, India that offers higher education in engineering, technology and allied sciences. The college was established in 1944 and was integrated with Anna University in 1978 from University of Madras as a constituent part of Anna University within its Guindy Campus.

== History ==
Alagappa College of Technology was founded in 1944. Funds for its establishment was donated by philanthropist Dr. Alagappa Chettiar to Dr. A. Lakshmanaswami Mudaliar, Vice Chancellor of Madras University in 1943. Dr. Alagappa Chettiar expressed an interest in setting up a college that offered newer technology related courses like Chemical Engineering, Textile Technology, Apparel Technology, Industrial Biotechnology, Food Technology, Pharmaceutical Technology, Ceramic Technology, Leather Technology and also courses related to Nanoscience. As a token of appreciation for his generosity Madras University resolved to name the college as Alagappa College of Technology and also conferred on him an honorary degree of LL.D. at a special convocation.

== Departments ==
There are six departments and two autonomous centres in Alagappa College of Technology.

- Department of Chemical Engineering
- Department of Applied Science and Technology
- Department of Textile Technology
- Center for Bio-Technology
- Department of Ceramic Technology
- Department of Leather Technology

Autonomous Centres

- Crystal Growth Centre
- Centre for Nanoscience and Technology

=== Department of Chemical Engineering ===
The Department of Chemical Engineering was established in 1944 under the University of Madras. In 1978, the department was integrated with the newly formed Anna University. In the early days of the college research was carried out in the conventional areas of chemical engineering like absorption, adsorption, liquid-liquid extraction, and fluid dynamics. Over the years, the areas of research have moved in line with developments in the chemical process industries. The department focuses on areas like bioprocesses, modeling, nanofiltration, bioengineering and environmental systems.

The department offers two undergraduate courses:

- B.Tech - Chemical Engineering
- B.Tech - Petroleum Refining and Petrochemical Technology (discontinued in 2012)

It also offers three postgraduate courses:

- M.Tech - Chemical Engineering
- M.Tech - Petroleum Refining and Petrochemical Technology
- M.Tech - Environmental Science and Engineering

The annual technical festival of the department is called Chemfluence. It features paper presentation sessions, lectures, video conferences and technical quizzes.

=== Department of Textile Technology ===
The Department of Textile Technology was established in 1945 under the University of Madras and was later integrated with the Anna University.

It offers two undergraduate courses:

- B.Tech - Textile Technology
- B.Tech - Apparel Technology

It also offers a postgraduate course M.Tech in Textile Technology. PhD programmes are also available. For subjects related to Physics, Chemistry, Engineering Graphics etc., the common laboratories of the Chemical Engineering Department building are used, while the Textile Department also has its own laboratories like the Fabric Science Lab, Chemical Processing Lab, Weaving Lab, Spinning Lab, Knitting Lab, Garment Construction Lab, Computer-Aided Designing Lab, Quality Assurance and Testing Lab. The department houses a library with a variety of books on standard engineering subjects, textile technology, fabric science, pattern making, garment industries, textile merchandising and marketing, knitting, sewing, fashion illustration, and other topics, which are available to be borrowed during the weekends.

=== Center for Biotechnology ===
The Center for Biotechnology was established in 1987 in Anna University with financial support from the Department of Biotechnology, University Grants Commission and Anna University. The center has a building of about 1000 square metres sponsored by Southern Petrochemicals Corporation Limited at Taramani Campus with facilities for carrying out research in areas such as biotechnology, bioprocess technology, molecular biology, cell biology, and immunology.

The department offers 3 undergraduate courses:

- B.Tech - Industrial Biotechnology
- B.Tech - Food Technology
- B.Tech - Pharmaceutical Technology

It also offers 5 postgraduate courses:

- M.Tech - Biotechnology
- M.Tech - Food Technology
- M.Tech - Pharmaceutical Technology
- M.Tech - Computational Biology
- M.Tech - Nano Science and Technology

The administrative building is located in the main campus at Guindy, and a separate academic complex offers teaching programs. The postgraduate program in Computational Biology is a network program conducted by Pondicherry University-Madurai Kamaraj University and anna University. It is the first of its kind in India started by DBT, India. It had been upgraded to M.Tech computational biology from the academic year 2014 in collaboration with Pondicherry university.

=== Department of Ceramic Technology ===
Anna University started an M.Tech Programme in Ceramic Technology in the Department of Chemical Engineering in 1990 with financial support of Rs.50 lakhs from M/s Carborundum Universal Ltd, Chennai. The Division of Ceramic Technology was formed in 1993. A B.Tech Programme in Ceramic Technology was started in 1996 with financial support of Rs.25 lakhs from M/s Carborundum Universal Ltd., Chennai.

=== Department of Applied Sciences and Technology ===
The Department of Applied Sciences was established in 2013. It offers a B.Tech course in Petroleum Engineering and Technology and an M.Tech course in Industrial Safety and Hazards Management.

=== Centre for Nanoscience and Technology ===
The Centre for Nanoscience and Technology was established at Anna University in 2005. The centre has been actively pursuing research in various aspects of nanoscience and technology including chemical, mechanical and biosynthesis of nanomaterials like semiconductor nanostructures, nanocrystalline thin films, carbon nanotubes and nanofibres, metallic nanoadhesives, polymer based nanocomposites and nanostructured ferroic materials.

The centre has been offering M. Tech. course in Nanoscience and Technology since 2008, which is supported by DST-Nanomission with a multi-disciplinary curriculum.

== Notable alumni ==
- C. Anandharamakrishnan, Director, Indian Institute of Food Processing Technology, Ministry of Food Processing Industries, Tanjavur
- M. S. Ananth, IIT Madras
- Viveck Goenka, Indian Express Group
- Y. G. Mahendra, Tamil and Malayalam actor
- M. M. Murugappan, of Murugappa Group
- G. V. Prasad, Dr. Reddy's labs
- Thirumalachari Ramasami, Secretary to Government of India, Department of Science and Technology
- N. Sankar of Chemplast Sanmar
- N. Srinivasan, India Cements
- L. K. Doraiswamy Padma Bhushan Awardee in 1990
