= Mohammad Islam Khan =

Indian glycobiologist and scientist

- Born: 24 December 1957; India
- Died: November 2010 (aged 52); Pune, Maharashtra, India
- Education: Indian Institute of Science; Aligarh Muslim University; Albert Einstein College of Medicine
- Known for: Studies on Lectins and peptides
- Awards: 1987 INSA Young Scientist Award; 1992 CSIR Young Scientist Award; 2002 N-BIOS Prize
- Scientific career
- Fields: Glycobiology; Nanobiotechnology
- Workplaces: University of Göttingen; Indian Institute of Chemical Biology; National Chemical Laboratory

Mohammad Islam Khan (24 December 1957 – November 2010) was an Indian glycobiologist and a scientist at the National Chemical Laboratory. Known for his studies on the biology of Lectins, Khan was an elected fellow of the National Academy of Sciences, India, Maharashtra Academy of Sciences and the Muslim Association for the Advancement of Science. The Department of Biotechnology of the Government of India awarded him the National Bioscience Award for Career Development, one of the highest Indian science awards, for his contributions to biosciences in 2002.

== Biography ==
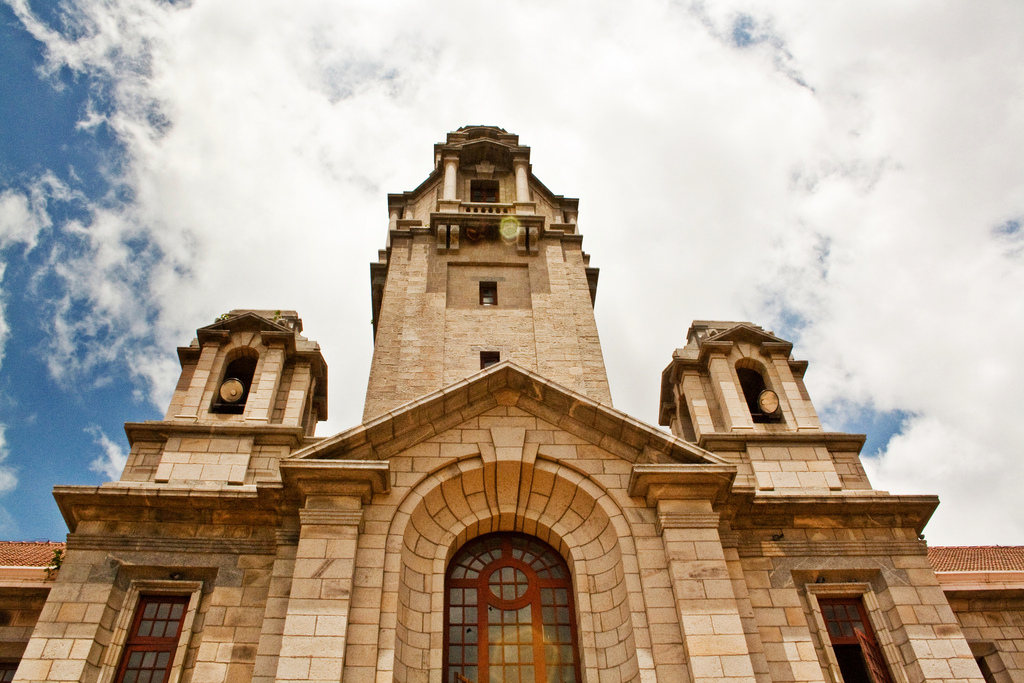
Indian Institute of Science

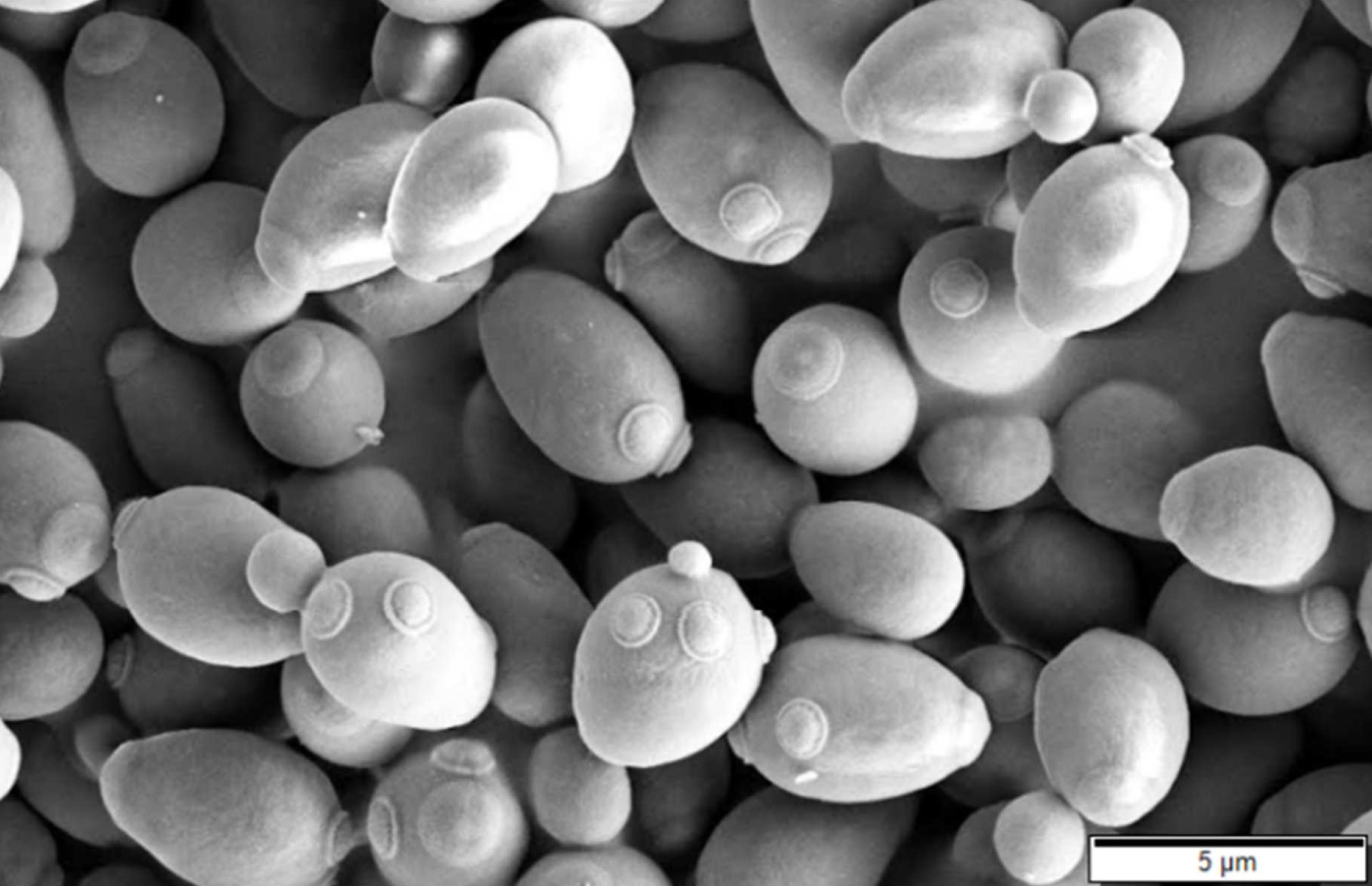
Saccharomyces cerevisiae

Born on the Christmas Eve of 1957, Mohammad Islam Khan obtained an MSc in biotechnology in 1978 and joined the Indian Institute of Chemical Biology (IICB) as a faculty, simultaneously doing his doctoral research at the Indian Institute of Science which earned him a PhD in 1986 from Aligarh Muslim University. Moving to the US, he did his post-doctoral work at Albert Einstein College of Medicine during 1987–90 and on his return to India in 1990, he joined the National Chemical Laboratory (NCL) as a scientist where he spent the rest of his career, barring a stint at the University of Göttingen during 2000–01 as an overseas associate of the Department of Biotechnology. He was holding the post of a scientist at the Division of Biochemical Sciences of NCL when he died in November 2010, aged 53.

== Legacy ==
Khan was known for his contributions in the disciplines of glycobiology and nanobiotechnology with special focus on the biology of lectins. His work was known to have assisted in widening our understanding of cell adhesion. He demonstrated the role of yeast cell surface lectins in the adhesion of yeast cells which is also known as flocculation. He isolated Fusarium sporotrichioides from rose plant which has since been deposited by him at the National Collection of Industrial Microorganisms (NCIM), a government-funded microbial culture repository based at NCL. The research team under his leadership was successful in isolating a peptide from Streptomyces that showed potency as an inhibitor of Cysteine proteases and the finding is reported to have use in the prophylaxis of cancer by preventing the migration of cancer cells. Towards the latter part of his career, he worked on the synthesis of metal‑metal sulphides/metal oxide nanoparticles using fungi and it was reported that the team synthesized the nano-particles outside a cell for the first time. His studies have been documented by way of a number of articles (Note: Please see Selected bibliography section) and PubMed, an online article repository of scientific articles has listed several of them.

== Awards and honors ==
The Indian National Science Academy awarded Khan the INSA Young Scientist Medal in 1987. Five years later, he received the 1992 Young Scientist Award of the Council of Scientific and Industrial Research. The Department of Biotechnology of the Government of India awarded him the National Bioscience Award for Career Development, one of the highest Indian science awards in 2002. He also received the elected fellowships from three Indian science academies namely, the National Academy of Sciences, India, Muslim Association for the Advancement of Science and Maharashtra Academy of Sciences.

== Selected bibliography ==
- Shabab, M.; Kulkarni, Mahesh J.; Khan, M. Islam (January 2008). "Study of papain-cystatin interaction by intensity fading MALDI-TOF-MS". The Protein Journal. 27 (1): 7–12. doi:10.1007/s10930-007-9102-3. ISSN 1572-3887. PMID 17763924. S2CID 29363617.
- Sahasrabuddhe, Anagh A.; Gaikwad, Sushama M.; Krishnasastry, M. V.; Khan, M. Islam (December 2004). "Studies on recombinant single chain Jacalin lectin reveal reduced affinity for saccharides despite normal folding like native Jacalin". Protein Science. 13 (12): 3264–3273. doi:10.1110/ps.04968804. ISSN 0961-8368. PMC 2287297. PMID 15557267.
- Khan, Md Idrish Raja; Saha, Ratan Kumar; Saha, Himadri (25 November 2017). "Muli bamboo (Melocanna baccifera) leaves ethanolic extract a non-toxic phyto-prophylactic against low pH stress and saprolegniasis in Labeo rohita fingerlings". Fish & Shellfish Immunology. 74: 609–619. doi:10.1016/j.fsi.2017.11.047. ISSN 1095-9947. PMID 29183812. S2CID 3625451.

== See also ==
- Nanoparticles
- Flocculation
