= Kallam =

Kallam is a Telugu surname. Notable people with the surname include:

- Kallam Anji Reddy (1939–2013), Indian entrepreneur
- Kallam Satish Reddy (fl. 1993), Indian business executive
