= M. Rajaram =

Indian electronics engineering scientist

- Occupations: Vice Chancellor, Anna University

Dr. M. Rajaram was an Indian professor, electronics engineering scientist, Academician and former Vice Chancellor of Anna University.

== Career ==
He graduated in electrical and electronics engineering from Alagappa Chettiar College of Engineering and Technology, Karaikudi, in 1981. He pursued his M. Tech in Power Systems at the Government College of Technology, Coimbatore and Ph.D (Control Systems) at PSG College of Technology, Coimbatore in 1994. Professor Rajaram was appointed vice-chancellor of Anna University of Technology, Tirunelveli, in 2010 before it was merged with the Chennai Campus. He had three decades of academic experience in electrical and electronics engineering. He later served as the Vice-Chancellor of the newly combined Anna University in 2013 and remained in office till May 2016 when his tenure ended. He died on 8 January 2025.

== Corruption ==
Rajaram had been booked for corruption on 25 March 2018.
