= Association for the Advancement of Science =

A number of organizations use the title Association for the Advancement of Science or a variation of.

== Organizations ==
- American Association for the Advancement of Science
- Australian and New Zealand Association for the Advancement of Science originally the Australasian Association for the Advancement of Science
- Brazilian Association for the Advancement of Science, Sociedade Brasileira para o Progresso da Ciência (Portuguese), also translated Brazilian Association for the Progress of Science.
- British Association for the Advancement of Science, now the British Science Association
- Muslim Association for the Advancement of Science, in India
- Pakistan Association for the Advancement of Science
- Southern Africa Association for the Advancement of Science, originally the South African Association for the Advancement of Science
