= Yogesh M. Joshi =

Indian chemical engineer (born 1974)

- Born: 29 December 1974 (age 51)
- Education: Maharashtra Institute of Technology; University of Pune; IIT Bombay; Benjamin Levich Institute
- Known for: Studies on metastable soft matter
- Awards: J C Bose Fellowship (2023) of Science and Engineering Research Board (); Academy excellence award of the Defense Research and Development Organization 2019 (); Distinguished Teacher Award of Indian Institute of Technology Kanpur (2018)(); Shanti Swarup Bhatnagar Award in Engineering Sciences (2015) (); Department of Atomic Energy - Science Research Council (DAE - SRC) Outstanding Investigator Award (2012) (); Indian National Academy Engineering (INAE) Young Engineer Award (2008) (); NASI Young Scientist Platinum Jubilee Award (2008)(); INSA Medal for Young Scientist (2006) (); Elected Fellow of the Society of Rheology, US (SoR) (2022) (); Elected Fellow of INSA (2023) (); Elected Fellow of IAS (2023) (); Elected Fellow of (NASI) (2017) (); Elected Fellow of INAE (2016) (); Elected Fellow of the Royal Society of Chemistry (FRSC) (Fellow of the Royal Society of Chemistry)
- Scientific career
- Fields: Rheology
- Workplaces: National Chemical Laboratory; IIT Kanpur
- Doctoral advisor: Ashish Kishore Lele; Devang Vipin Khakhar; Raghunath Anant Mashelkar
- Other academic advisors: Morton Denn

Yogesh Moreshwar Joshi (born 1974) is an Indian chemical engineer, rheologist and the Mr. & Mrs. Gian Singh Bindra Chair Professor at the Indian Institute of Technology, Kanpur. He is known for his studies on metastable soft matter and is an elected fellow of the Society of Rheology, Indian National Science Academy, Indian Academy of Sciences, The National Academy of Sciences, India, and Indian National Academy of Engineering. In 2015, the Council of Scientific and Industrial Research, the apex agency of the Government of India for scientific research, awarded Joshi the Shanti Swarup Bhatnagar Prize for Science and Technology for his contributions to Engineering Sciences. In 2023, he received prestigious J C Bose fellowship constituted by the Science and Engineering Research Board, Government of India.

== Early life and education ==
Yogesh Joshi was born on 29 December 1974 in Ahmednagar, in the Indian state of Maharashtra. Joshi obtained a Bachelor of Engineering (B.E.) degree from the University of Pune in 1996. Subsequently, he started his career as a research assistant at the National Chemical Laboratory (NCL) the same year. After a year of service, he enrolled for doctoral studies at the Indian Institute of Technology, Bombay, performing research at NCL as a research fellow. Completing his Doctor of Philosophy (Ph.D.) in 2001, Joshi moved to the United States to pursue postdoctoral studies at the Benjamin Levich Institute (2001–2004).

== Work ==
On his return to India in 2004, he joined the Indian Institute of Technology, Kanpur (IIT) as an assistant professor; he became an associate professor in 2009. He continues his service at IIT Kanpur as a professor in the department of chemical engineering. He was the C . V. Seshadri Chair position in the department during 2015–2018. He was the Pandit Girish & Sushma Rani Pathak Chair Professor from 2021-2024. Presently, he is the Mr. & Mrs. Gian Singh Bindra Chair Professor. During his service at IIT Kanpur, he held two fellowships, the Faculty Research Fellowship from 2009–2012 and the P. K. Kelkar Faculty Research Fellowship from 2013 to 2016. He also served as a visiting professor at the University of Maine in 2008, at the University of Edinburgh in 2010, the Institute of Electronic Structure and Lasers (IESL), Greece in May 2015 and at the Institute of Chemical Technology in June 2015 as Shri V. V. Mariwala visiting professor.

Joshi is a senior editor of Langmuir and is on the editorial advisory board of Physics of Fluids, Rheologica Acta, and Journal of Rheology.

== Research ==
Joshi's research includes contributions to the fields of the structure and dynamics of colloidal glasses and gels, soft matter, Rheology of complex fluids and polymer nanocomposites. Joshi's research team at IIT Kanpur engages in multidisciplinary research on "molecular phenomena that is responsible for the flow behavior," specifically the rheological behavior of discotic nematic suspensions. His work has assisted in widening the understanding of the processing of soft matter and in the prediction of its shelf life. He is reported to have elucidated "the concept of time – temperature – stress equivalence for soft glassy materials" for the first time and has developed a non-equilibrium thermodynamics theory for predicting the approach of soft glassy material to equilibrium. He is the treasurer of the Indian Society of Rheology. Invited or keynote speeches delivered by him include the 2008 Soft Materials Seminar organized by Laboratoire de physique des solides and the 18th Mid-Year Meeting conducted by the Indian Academy of Sciences in 2007.

== Awards and honors ==
Joshi was selected for the BRNS Young Scientist Research Award of the Department of Atomic Energy (DAE) in 2006; he received another DAE honor in 2012 in the form of the SRC Outstanding Investigator Award. He received the Young Scientist Medal of the Indian National Science Academy in 2006, and the Indian National Academy of Engineering chose him for the Young Engineer Award in 2008. In between, the Indian Institute of Chemical Engineers awarded him the first of their two awards, the Diamond Jubilee Young Achiever Award in 2007. He received another honor from IIChE, the Amar Dye Chem Award, two years later. He received two awards from the National Academy of Sciences, India, NASI Young Scientist Platinum Jubilee Award in 2008, and NASI Scopus Young Scientist Award in 2012. He earned the Distinguished Alumnus Award of the Maharashtra Institute of Technology in 2010, and the Council of Scientific and Industrial Research awarded him the Shanti Swarup Bhatnagar Prize. He received one more award in 2015, the C. N. R. Rao Faculty Award of the Indian Institute of Technology, Kanpur. He is a life member of the National Academy of Sciences, India, and the award orations delivered by him include the 2015 Dr. R. A. Mashelkar Endowment Lecture of National Chemical Laboratory. In 2018, Joshi was awarded the Distinguished Teacher Award by the Indian Institute of Technology Kanpur. He is also a recipient of the Academy Excellence Award constituted by the Defence Research and Development Organisation for the year 2019.

Joshi is an elected fellow of the Indian National Science Academy, the Indian Academy of Sciences, the National Academy of Sciences, India, the Indian National Academy of Engineering, and the Society of Rheology.

== Selected bibliography ==
=== Books ===
- Yogesh M. Joshi; Sameer Khandekar (4 June 2015). Nanoscale and Microscale Phenomena: Fundamentals and Applications. Springer. ISBN 978-81-322-2289-7.

== See also ==
- Soft matter
