= N. Sankar =

Indian industrialist (1945–2022)

- Born: 19 November 1945
- Died: 17 April 2022 (aged 76); Chennai, Tamil Nadu, India
- Education: AC College of Technology, Illinois Institute of Technology
- Occupation: Industrialist

Narayanan Sankar (19 November 1945 – 17 April 2022) was an Indian industrialist and chairman of the Sanmar group, a diversified Indian conglomerate. During a career spanning over five decades, he led the group's diversification into multiple businesses ranging from chemicals to shipping. Sankar had also been the president of the Indian industry organization ASSOCHAM and chairman of the Madras Chamber of Commerce and Industry.

== Early life ==
Sankar was born on 19 November 1945 to Madhuram and K. S. Narayanan, and was the elder of two siblings. He was the grandson of Indian industrialist S. N. N. Sankaralinga Iyer, who was the founder of India Cements and Indo-Commercial Bank. Sankar obtained his bachelor's in science from AC College of Technology in Madras (now Chennai) and later went on to get his master's degree in chemical engineering from the Illinois Institute of Technology in Chicago.

Sankar was involved with cricket and tennis as a youngster. He was coached on the tennis court by T.K. Ramanathan, who was the father of Indian tennis player Ramanathan Krishnan and grandfather of tennis player Ramesh Krishnan. His tennis career was cut short when he was diagnosed with polio when he was 17. He continued to play cricket for the Madras league cricket team Jai Hind CC playing as a batsman and a medium pace bowler, and was known to be a slip fielder.

== Career ==
Sankar started his career with the Sanmar group's flagship company Chemplast in 1961 after returning to India upon the completion of his masters. The group's name itself was a combination of his name and his brother, N. Kumar's names. Sankar led the group's acquisition of Industrial Chemicals and Monomers, a company that manufactured carbide. He led the group's efforts in developing integrated manufacturing processes for their chemicals, specifically for the production of the synthetic plastic polymer, polyvinyl chloride, at Chemplast. During his time at the group, he led the group's growth both organic and through acquisitions. The group expanded its business footprint and helped with the group's international expansion. The group had joint ventures with companies including Bayer Corporation, Cabot Corporation, AMP Australia, Dragoco, and Tyco International, and expanded its focus to include shipping, finance, insurance. He introduced modern management practices and principles of corporate governance within the group, separating ownership from management.

In the late 1970s, Sankar and his brother Kumar's families were involved in a legal battle with N. Srinivasan and his brother N. Ramachandran over the running of India Cements. This had resulted in the intervention of financial institutions including IDBI which forced both Sankar and Srinivasan's families out of the board of the company and had bureaucrats and professional managers run the company, and at one point even attempted to sell-off the company to ITC Limited, the Indian tobacco giant. However, in the early 1990s, the families reconciled and Sankar was made the chairman while Srinivasan was given charge of running the company. Sankar stepped down from his positions in 2007 and the Sanmar group sold their stake in the company in 2013.

Sankar served in leadership roles at multiple industry organizations including president of ASSOCHAM between 1991 and 1992, chairman of the Madras Chamber of Commerce and Industry between 1986 and 1987, chairman of the Indo US Joint Business Council between 1998 and 1999. He partnered with other auto-industry leaders to draft the Tamil Nadu state government's industry policy in the 1990s, culminating in the setup of Ford Motor Company's greenfield manufacturing plant in partnership with Mahindra and Mahindra in Maraimalainagar in Tamil Nadu. He was the honorary consul of Denmark in South India between 1989 and 2017 and had been awarded the Knight of the Order of the Dannebrog, first class, by the Danish government.

Sankar remained involved in cricket and tennis over the years. He ran the Madras first-division cricket team Jolly Rovers; amongst the players from the club included Indian cricketer S. Venkataraghavan and wicket-keeper Bharath Reddy. The Chemplast cricket team had cricketers like Anil Kumble and Harbhajan Singh playing for the team. He also owned the Alwarpet CC cricket team. Sankar had also served as the vice president of the All India Tennis Association and the president of the Tamil Nadu Cricket Association and the Tamil Nadu Tennis Association. He was also a patron of the arts and was the chairman of Sruthi foundation, a classical performing arts organization. Sankar was a member of the board of governors of the Indian Institute of Management Kozhikode.

== Personal life ==
Sankar and his wife, Chandra, had a son and a daughter. Sankar died on 17 April 2022 in Chennai, India. He was aged 76.
