= Kallam Satish Reddy =

Indian business executive

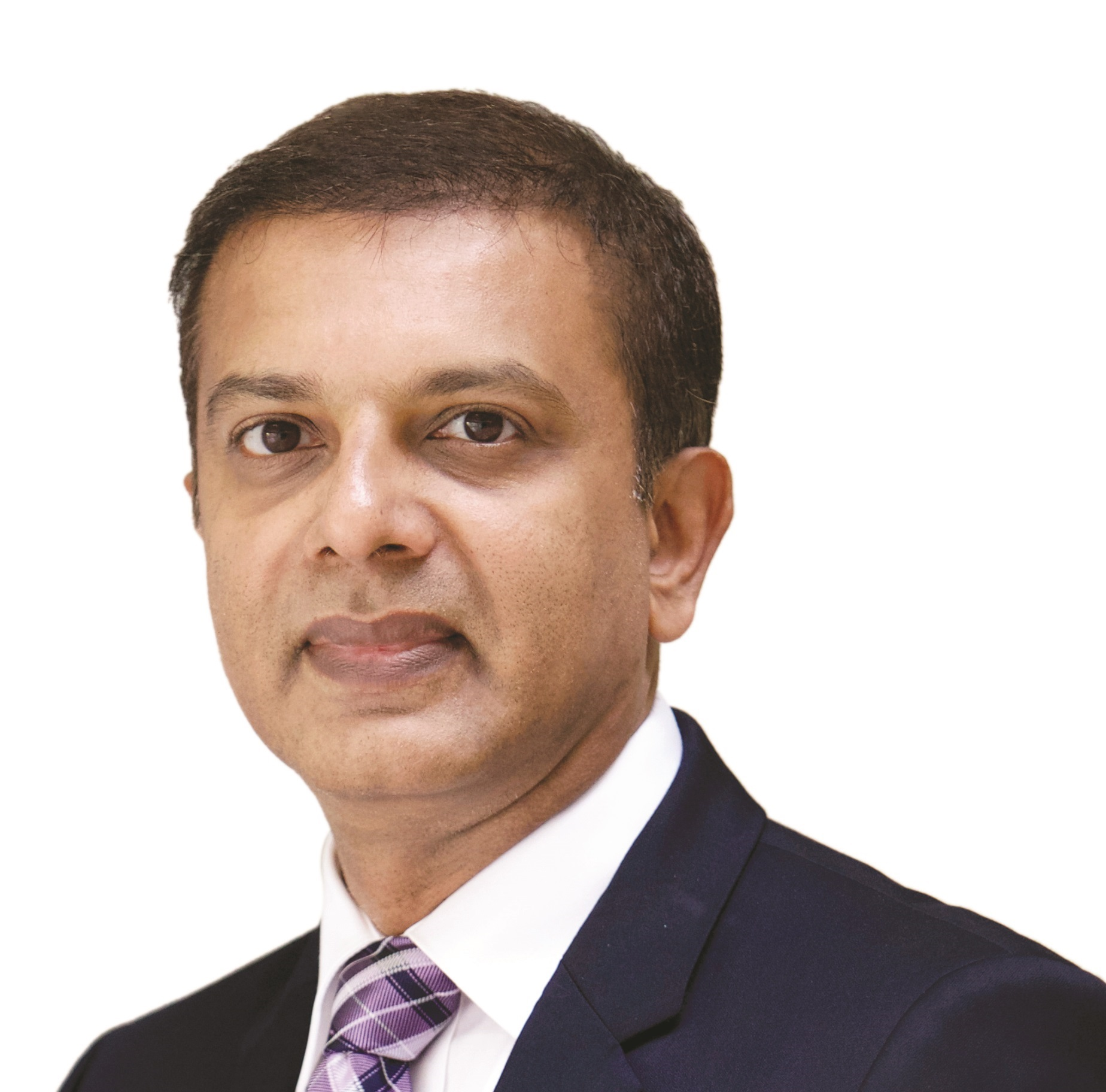
- Education: Purdue University; Osmania University
- Occupation: Chairman of Dr. Reddy's Laboratories
- Relatives: Kallam Anji Reddy (father); G. V. Prasad (brother-in-law); Alla Ayodhya Rami Reddy (brother-in-law)

Kallam Satish Reddy is an Indian business executive and current Chairman of Dr. Reddy's Laboratories. Reddy joined Dr. Reddy's Laboratories in 1993 as executive director. Elevated to the role of Managing Director in 1997, he led the company's transition from a manufacturer of active pharmaceutical ingredients to one with a diverse product portfolio of finished dosage formulations. Reddy was also responsible for establishing a strong footprint of Dr. Reddy's finished dosage products in Russia, CIS countries and other emerging markets.

Reddy currently also serves as the Chairman of Dr. Reddy's Foundation, which works to help the less privileged create sustainable livelihoods through appropriate vocational education. He is a Trustee of the Naandi Foundation, which works in the areas of child rights and education, safe drinking water, agriculture export marketing support and other empowerment initiatives.

Reddy holds a B.S. in Chemical Engineering from Osmania University, and an M.S. in Medicinal Chemistry from Purdue University.

== Memberships and associations ==
On 10 October 2019, Reddy was named as the President of the Indian Pharmaceutical Alliance. He currently chairs the Life Sciences Sector Skill Development Council (LSSSDC) under The National Skill Development Corporation (NSDC), an organization, working to address the skill shortfalls in the Life Sciences sector across India. He is also the Chairman of the Board of Governors of NIPER Hyderabad and is Deputy Chair of the Confederation of Indian Industry Southern Region. He was a member of the Drugs Technical Advisory Board of India, the Chairman of the Andhra Pradesh Chapter of the Confederation of Indian Industry and head of its National Committee on Pharmaceuticals. In May 2015, the Ministry of Labour and Employment, Government of India, nominated Reddy as Chairman of the Board of Governors of the National Safety Council. He is also chairman for Life Sciences Sector Skill Development Council.

== Awards ==
Reddy was identified as a "Young Global Leader for 2007" by the World Economic Forum, and was presented with the India Business Leaders Awards (IBLA) award by CNBC in 2005 for his contributions to Corporate Social Responsibility.
