= Ashish Kishore Lele =

Indian chemical engineer (born 1967)

- Born: 3 April 1967 (age 59); Maharashtra, India
- Education: Institute of Chemical Technology; University of Delaware
- Known for: Studies on micro and mesostructure of polymers
- Awards: 1988 UoM S. G. Kane Gold Medal; 1992UoD R. L. Pigford Best Teaching Assistant Award; 1996 CSIR Young Scientist Award; 1998 INSA Young Scientist Award; 2003 UDCT UAA Distinguished Alumnus Award; 2006 Shanti Swarup Bhatnagar Prize; 2012 Infosys Prize
- Scientific career
- Fields: Polymer science; Rheology
- Workplaces: University of Delaware; University of Cambridge; National Chemical Laboratory
- Notable students: Yogesh M. Joshi, Shyni Varghese ()

Ashish Kishore Lele (born 3 April 1967) is an Indian chemical engineer, rheologist and the Director of the National Chemical Laboratory, Pune. He is known for his researches on micro and mesostructure of polymers and is an elected fellow of the Indian Academy of Sciences, and the Indian National Academy of Engineering. The Council of Scientific and Industrial Research, the apex agency of the Government of India for scientific research, awarded him the Shanti Swarup Bhatnagar Prize for Science and Technology, one of the highest Indian science awards for his contributions to Engineering Sciences in 2006. (Note: Long link – please select award year to see details) He received the Infosys Prize in 2012.

== Early life ==
Lele, born on 3 April 1967 in Maharashtra, graduated in chemical engineering from UDCT in Mumbai in 1988. He moved to the US for his doctoral studies at the University of Delaware from where he secured a PhD in 1993, simultaneously working as a research assistant at the university.

== Career ==
Returning to India, he started his career by joining National Chemical Laboratory in 1993 as a scientist. While working at NCL, he took a sabbatical to complete his postdoctoral studies at Cambridge University from July 2000 to December 2001. Subsequently, he resumed his service at NCL where he later held the chair of the department of Polymer Science and Engineering. In 2018, he opted to take the role of Senior Vice President (R & R&D) at Reliance Industries Ltd where he served till 31 March 2021. On 1 April 2021, he became the thirteenth Director of the CSIR-National Chemical Laboratory Pune. He has also served as a visiting professor at Institut des sciences de l'ingénieur de Toulon et du Var (Institute of Engineering Sciences of Toulon and the Var – ISITV).

== Research ==
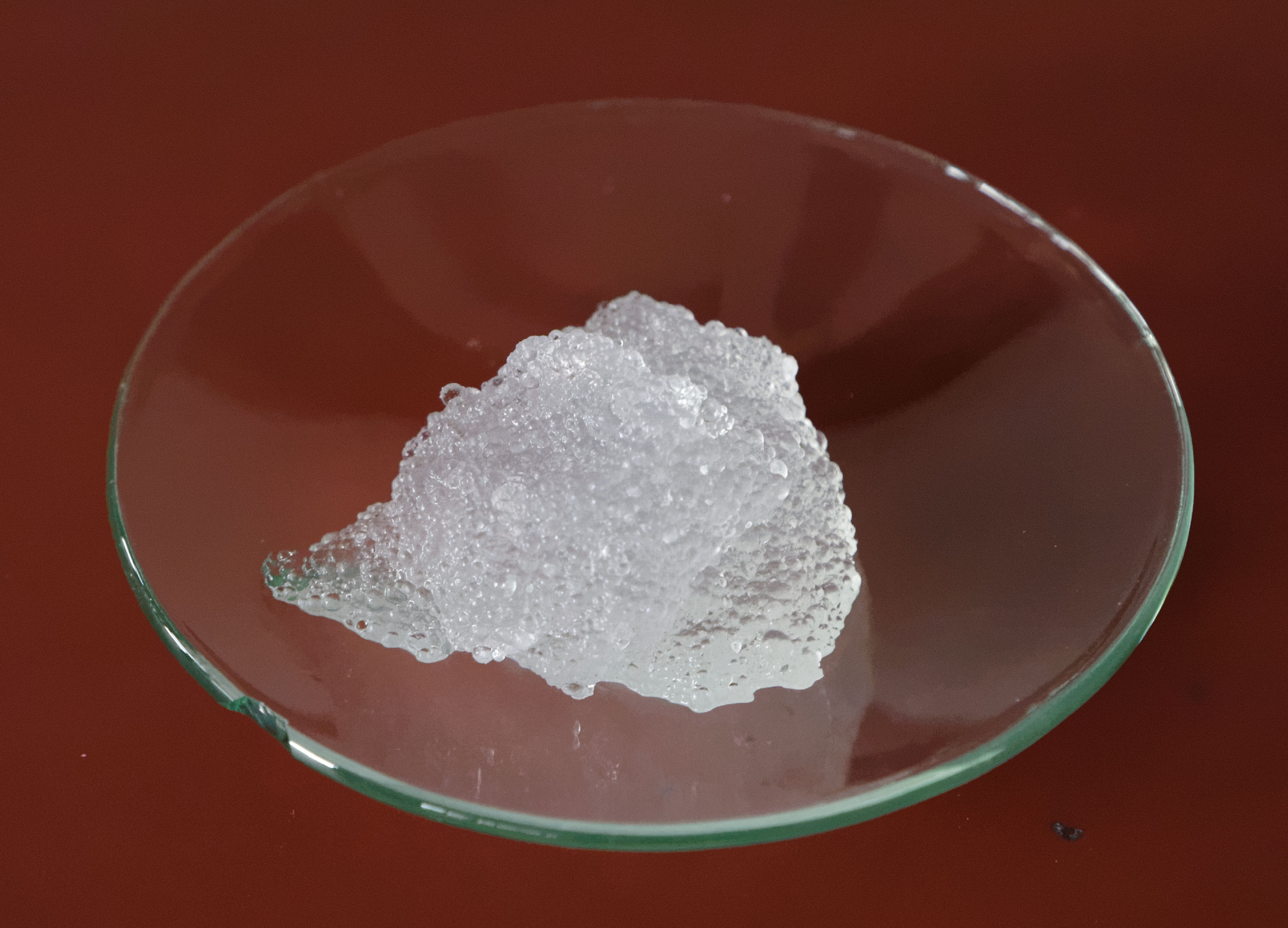
Hygrogel of a superabsorbant Hydrogel

Bulk of Lele's researches have been based on the theoretical and experimental studies of micro and mesostructure of polymers and his studies widened the understanding of their macroscopic dynamical and equilibrium properties. He was the first scientist to elucidate the amoeba-like dynamics of ring polymers and proposed the mean field theoretical framework of specific weak molecular interactions in gels for the first time. He developed tailored molecules of stimuli responsive smart hydrogels and explained the anomalous rheological behaviour of complex fluids. He has documented his researches by way of several articles; (Note: Please see Selected bibliography section) Google Scholar and ResearchGate, online article repositories of scientific articles, have listed many of them. He holds a number of patents for the processes he has developed.

Lele is a director at Orthocrafts Innovations Private Limited and Amps Innovations Private Limited and is the co-founder and adviser of BioMed Innovations, a start-up established at the NCL Venture Center. He is the president of the Indian Society of Rheology and is a member of Rheologica Acta, the official journal of the European Society of Rheology, since 2010. He is also a member of the Society of Rheology, USA as well as the Indian chapter of the Society of Polymer Science, and sits in the Management and Advisory Team of IPUA Virtual Technical Center. He was a member of the National Organizing Committee of the International Conference on Polymer Science and Technology held in Thiruvananthapuram in January 2017 and has delivered several keynote or invited talks; the list includes the 78th Annual Meeting of the Society of Rheology at Portland, Maine in October 2006 (Note: He presented a paper, Dynamics of flexible ring polymers in obstacle environment) and COMSOL Conference 2015 where he presented a paper on Sensitivity Analysis of MEA Parameters on the Performance of HT-PEM Fuel Cell via COMSOL Multiphysics Modeling. He has also guided several doctoral scholars in their studies.

=== Selected patents ===
- Kalyani Suresh Chikhalikar, Ashish Kishore Lele, Harshwardhan Vinayak Pol, Kishor Shankar Jadhav, Sunil Janardan Mahajan, Zubair Ahmad (9 January 2014). "Modified polypropylene compositions for reduced necking in extrusion film casting or extrusion coating processes". US Patent No. US 20150018463 A1. Google Patents.
- Shailesh Prakash Nagarkar, Ashish Kishore Lele (15 July 2014). "Accelerated gelation of regenerated fibroin". US Patent No. US8779097 B2. Google Patents.
- Chirag Deepak Kalekar, Pramod Appukuttan Pullarkatt, Seshagiri Rao, Ashish Kishore Lele (17 July 2014). "An optical fiber-based force transducer for microscale samples". US Patent No. WO 2014108874 A1. Google Patents.
- Ashish Kishore Lele, Abhijit Pravin Shete, Karan Vivek Dikshit (8 December 2016). "A one step process for the pelletisation of poly lactic acid without melt processing". US Patent No. WO 2016194006 A1. Google Patents.

== Awards and honours ==
Lele won two honours during his college days, S. G. Kane Gold Medal and Sohrab Coomi Mistry fellowship of the University of Mumbai for being class topper in his bachelor's degree class in 1988. At University of Delaware, he was selected for the Competitive Graduate Research Fellowship in 1988 and later, he was chosen for the R. L. Pigford Best Teaching Assistant Award in 1992. Back in India, he received the Young Scientist Award of the Council of Scientific and Industrial Research in 1996, followed by the Young Scientists Medal of the Indian National Science Academy in 1998. His alma mater, UDCT, honoured him in 2003 with the UAA Distinguished Alumnus Award, and The Week magazine included him in the list of India's 50 Emerging Stars the same year. The Council of Scientific and Industrial Research awarded him the Shanti Swarup Bhatnagar Prize, one of the highest Indian science awards in 2006. The same year, he was elected as a fellow by the Indian National Academy of Engineering and he became an elected fellow of the Indian Academy of Sciences in 2010. Infosys Science Foundation chose him for Infosys Prize in Engineering and Computing Science in 2013.

== Selected bibliography ==
- Subramanian, Ganapathy; Ranade, Vivek; Nagarkar, Shailesh; Lele, Ashish (2005). "Matched asymptotic solution for flow in a semi-hyperbolic die". Chemical Engineering Science. 60 (11): 3107–3110. Bibcode:2005ChEnS..60.3107S. doi:10.1016/j.ces.2004.12.043.
- Kulkarni, Chandrashekhar; Belsare, Nilesh; Lele, Ashish (2006). "Studies on Shrikhand Rheology". Journal of Food Engineering. 74 (2): 169–177. doi:10.1016/j.jfoodeng.2005.02.029.
- Ganvir, Vivek; Lele, Ashish; Thaokar, Rochish; Gautham, B. P. (2007). "Simulation of viscoelastic flows of polymer solutions in abrupt contractions using an arbitrary Lagrangian Eulerian (ALE) based finite element method". Journal of Non-Newtonian Fluid Mechanics. 143 (2–3): 157–169. Bibcode:2007JNNFM.143..157G. doi:10.1016/j.jnnfm.2007.02.009.
- Iyer, Balaji V. S.; Shanbhag, Sachin; Juvekar, Vinay A.; Lele, Ashish K. (2008). "Self-diffusion coefficient of ring polymers in semidilute solution". Journal of Polymer Science Part B: Polymer Physics. 46 (21): 2370–2379. Bibcode:2008JPoSB..46.2370I. doi:10.1002/polb.21569.
- Ganvir, Vivek; Lele, Ashish; Thaokar, Rochish; Gautham, B. P. (2009). "Prediction of extrudate swell in polymer melt extrusion using an Arbitrary Lagrangian Eulerian (ALE) based finite element method". Journal of Non-Newtonian Fluid Mechanics. 156 (1–2): 21–28. Bibcode:2009JNNFM.156...21G. doi:10.1016/j.jnnfm.2008.06.006.

== See also ==
- Finite element method
- Complex fluids
- Fibroin
- Polymers
