= M. S. Ananth =

Indian academic

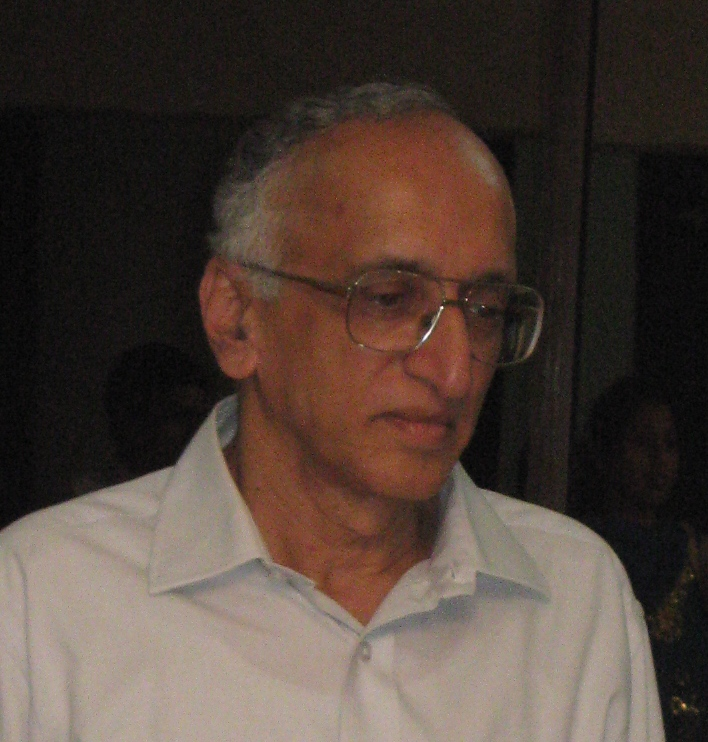
- Born: 1945 (age 80–81); India
- Education: University of Florida, Gainesville; Anna University
- Known for: Thermodynamics
- Awards: Herdillia award for excellence in basic research in chemical engineering (IIChE 1994)
- Scientific career
- Fields: Chemical engineering
- Workplaces: Indian Institute of Technology, Madras
- Doctoral advisor: Keith E. Gubbins

Madaboosi Santanam Ananth is an Indian academic who served as the director of the Indian Institute of Technology, Madras from 2001 to 2011. He was presented with The Herdillia award for excellence in basic research in chemical engineering.

== Biography ==
He did his schooling in Madras Christian College Higher Secondary School. Ananth is an alumnus of Alagappa College of Technology, Chennai, where he completed his bachelor's degree in chemical engineering with a gold medal. Subsequently, he obtained his M.E. and Ph.D. (1972) degrees from University of Florida, Gainesville. His doctoral work at the University of Florida was on molecular thermodynamics, and his advisor was Keith E. Gubbins, a famous British-born internationally renowned scientist, who figures in the list of "hundred great chemical engineers" in America after the post-war years, and who is a distinguished professor at the North Carolina State University, Raleigh.

He was a visiting faculty at Princeton University(1982–83) and a visiting scientist at National Institute of Standards and Technology, Boulder, Colorado(1990–91). He was a visiting scientist in the National Institute of Standards and Technology, Boulder, Colorado (1990–91), in RWTH, Aachen, Germany (summer 1983 and summer 1999) and a visiting thermodynamics expert in Aspen Tech, Massachusetts, US (summer 1991).

He has held various senior positions such as the head of the department, dean of academic courses and dean of academic research.

Ananth is the head of NPTEL's Project Implementation committee, and the NPTEL program is often referred to as his 'brainchild'. He also serves on the boards of companies, including Chennai Petroleum Corporation Limited, Neyveli Lignite Corporation and Medlab Asia.

== Research interests ==
- Thermodynamics
- Mathematical modeling
- Engineering education

== Awards, honors and memberships ==
- Herdillia award for excellence in basic research in chemical engineering (IIChE 1994)
- Fellow, Indian Institute of Chemical Engineering
- Fellow, Indian National Academy of Engineering
