= G. V. Prasad =

Indian business executive

- Education: Purdue University; Illinois Institute of Technology; Alagappa College of Technology
- Occupations: Co-Chairman and Managing Director of Dr. Reddy's Laboratories
- Relatives: Kallam Anji Reddy (father-in-law); Kallam Satish Reddy (brother-in-law)

G. V. Prasad (Telugu: జి.వి. ప్రసాద్) is an Indian business executive, and co-chairman and managing director of Dr. Reddy's Laboratories. He studied chemical engineering at the Alagappa College of Technology. After completing five semesters, Prasad went on to the Illinois Institute of Technology in Chicago to complete his remaining undergraduate degree. Prasad then went on to pursue a one-year MBA at Purdue University. Prasad won the 'Outstanding Senior Student' Award from the American Institute of Chemists, Chicago chapter in 1982. He earned his master's degree in industrial administration from Purdue University in 1983.

In 1985, Prasad was working at Benzex Labs, a pharmaceutical enterprise that he co-founded. Benzex was later acquired by Dr. Reddy's Laboratories. He then left the industry to focus on construction. In 1990, he reemerged in pharmaceuticals and became the CEO and MD of Cheminor Drugs Ltd. In 2001, Cheminor Drugs merged with Dr. Reddy's Laboratories and Prasad took over as the vice-chairman and CEO of the merged entity.

== Early life ==
Prasad was born in 1960. He is the second child of Syamala and Harishchandra Reddy. He began his initial schooling at the Vidyaranya High School in Hyderabad, Andhra Pradesh, India. He later moved to his hometown, Nellore, where he finished his schooling at VR High School.

== Personal life ==
Prasad is married to Anuradha, the daughter of Kallam Anji Reddy, who is the founder of Dr. Reddy's Laboratories. Anuradha is the managing trustee of Dr. Reddy's Foundation as well as the founder-director of Saptaparni, an organization promoting the traditions and culture of India.

== Early career ==
After completing his master's degree from Purdue University, Prasad returned to India and joined his father's construction business; immersing himself in various projects in Karnataka. In 1985, he co-founded Benzex Labs, an API manufacturing company, which was later acquired by Dr Reddy's Laboratories. He briefly returned to the construction business before reappearing on the pharma landscape in 1990 as managing director of Cheminor Drugs Ltd. Prasad transformed Cheminor into a world class API and generics manufacturer, largely through his focus on professionalism, good governance and transparency.

In 2001, Cheminor Drugs merged with Dr. Reddy's Laboratories and Prasad took over as the vice-chairman and CEO of the merged entity. Since taking over this position, Dr. Reddy's has had a successful global generics strategy. Prasad envisioned newer business platforms like the Custom Pharmaceutical business and Specialty pharmaceuticals and is dedicated to building the innovation side of the company.

== Professional affiliations ==
- AP State Committee, WWF-India
- Member of the advisory board, Acumen Fund
- Member of the board, Cyient Ltd.
- Member of the board, Diana Hotels, India
- Member of the board, Ocimum Bio Solutions
- Member, American Chemical Society
- Member, American Institute of Chemical Engineers
- Chairman of the CII National Committee on Environment and the Intellectual Property Committee (2006–2007)
