= Richard H. Wilhelm =

American chemical engineer (1909–1968)

Richard Herman Wilhelm (January 10, 1909 – August 6, 1968) was an American chemical engineer notable for developing a new method of fluid separation called chemical parametric pumping. Wilhelm was also notable for pioneering in the development of fluid beds, which according to Princeton University "revolutionized the petroleum-cracking process". Princeton University established Wilhelm Lectures in his honor. Wilhelm was a member of the National Academy of Engineering Fellow of the American Academy of Arts and Sciences, and a chairman of the department of chemical engineering at Princeton University. Princeton University called Wilhelm "an authority on chemical reaction engineering".

== Life ==
Wilhelm was born in New York City and received B.S in engineering, M.S. in chemical engineering and Ph.D. from Columbia University in 1931, 1932 and 1934, respectively. He then spent his all of his career at Princeton University until his death in 1968, becoming chairman of chemical engineering department in 1954.
