= Kallam Anji Reddy =

Indian entrepreneur and founder of Dr. Reddy's Laboratories

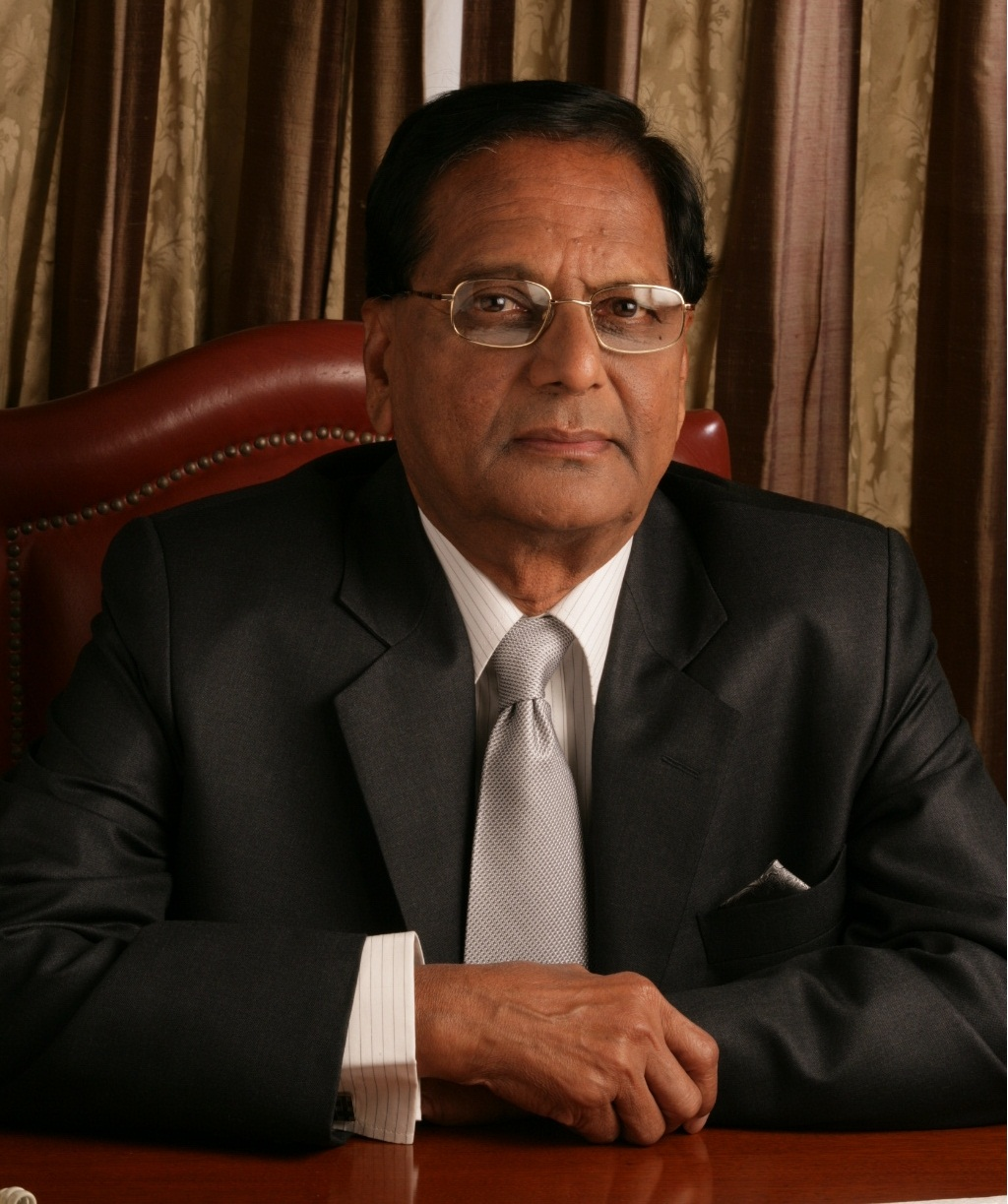
- Born: 10 August 1941; Tadepalli, Guntur, Andhra Pradesh, India
- Died: 15 March 2013 (aged 71); Hyderabad, Andhra Pradesh (now Telangana), India
- Education: B. Sc. (Andhra), B. Sc. (Bombay), Ph. D. (NCL)
- Alma mater: Andhra Christian College, Guntur, Institute of Chemical Technology, Mumbai, National Chemical Laboratory, Pune
- Occupations: Former Chairman, Dr. Reddy's Laboratories
- Known for: Dr. Reddy's Laboratories
- Relatives: Kallam Satish Reddy (son); G. V. Prasad (son-in-law)

Kallam Anji Reddy (10 August 1941 – 15 March 2013) was an Indian entrepreneur in the pharmaceutical industry, the founder-chairman of Dr. Reddy's Laboratories, which he established in 1984, and chairman of Dr Reddy's Foundation (DRF), the corporate social responsibility arm of the group, established 1996. He was a member of the Indian Prime Minister's Council on Trade and Industry.

== Life ==
Reddy initially attended SKPVV Hindu High School, Vijayawada. After graduating from Annapotanna Zilla Parishath High School Nutakki, Reddy received his first Bachelor of Science degree from A.C. College at Guntur in 1958. He then earned his B.Sc.(Tech) in Pharmaceuticals and Fine Chemicals from the University Department of Chemical Technology of University of Mumbai (now Institute of Chemical Technology, Mumbai), followed by a PhD in chemical engineering under L.K Doraiswamy from the National Chemical Laboratory, Pune in 1969.

Reddy died of cancer on 15 March 2013 at the Apollo Hospital in Hyderabad.

== Awarded ==
The Government of India honoured him with the Padma Shri in 2001 and later with the Padma Bhushan in 2011 for his contribution to the Indian pharmaceutical industry.
