= National Collection of Industrial Microorganisms =

The National Collection of Industrial Microorganisms (NCIM) is an Indian Government organized microbial culture repository located in NCL, Pune, in western India. It is basically a non-profit organization which serves as a repository for isolation, preservation and distribution of industrially important cultures based on scientifically published articles. It was established in the year 1951 and claims to be the oldest and biggest culture repository in India. Initially it started with 400 cultures, as of April 2010, NCIM maintains over 3700 non-pathogenic pure cultures.
NCIM is a member of World Federation for Culture Collections (WFCC) and has an online search-able database and strains.
