= William Hultz Walker =

American chemical engineer (1869–1934)

William Hultz Walker (April 7, 1869 – July 9, 1934) was an American chemist and professor. He was born in Pittsburgh, Pennsylvania, and graduated in 1890 at Penn State College and took his Ph.D. at Göttingen (1892). In 1894 he accepted the chair of industrial chemistry at the Massachusetts Institute of Technology, where from 1908 he was also director of the research laboratory of applied chemistry. Walker was vice president of the International Congress of Applied Chemistry in 1893 and president of the American Electrochemical Society in 1910. The New York Section of the American Chemical Society conferred on him its Nichols medal in 1908.

== Significance ==
William H. Walker, as he is commonly referenced, was one of the pioneers of chemical engineering practice and principles in the United States. He was the first graduate in chemistry at Penn State in 1890. He earned an M.S. in chemistry from Penn State, and a Ph.D. in organic chemistry from Göttingen University, before returning to Penn State, where he served as an instructor in chemistry in 1892 - 1894. He moved to Massachusetts Institute of Technology (MIT) in 1894, and in 1917 founded the School of Chemical Engineering Practice.

Although he was trained as a chemist, and worked as a chemistry educator, Dr. Walker was extremely influential in developing modern chemical engineering discipline. He is considered one of the founders of that discipline.

== Professional life ==
Dr. Walker and Arthur Dehon Little formed Little and Walker, a partnership, in 1900, where Walker worked until 1905. He then returned to full-time academic work as an associate professor at MIT, in charge of the newly opened Research Laboratory of Applied Chemistry. Little remained in business, which he incorporated as the Arthur D. Little, Inc. in 1909. Little and Walker maintained a professional relationship after dissolving the partnership. Little was active as member and chairman of the MIT Corporation Visiting Committees for Chemistry and Chemical Engineering. Little propounded the concept of "unit operations" to explain industrial chemistry processes in 1916.

According to MIT, its department of chemistry first awarded seven bachelor's degrees in chemical engineering in 1891. These grew out of the development of Course X, which combined mechanical engineering with industrial chemistry. In 1917 founded the School of Chemical Engineering Practice. During this time, Dr. Walker remained in the department of chemistry. In 1920, MIT formed the department of chemical engineering, chaired by Warren K. Lewis. In 1924, MIT awarded its first Ph.D. degrees in chemical engineering.

Walker collaborated with Warren K. Lewis and W. H. McAdams in writing the first American textbook of chemical engineering, Principles of Chemical Engineering, published in 1924. This incorporated the concept of unit operations, and became the standard textbook for chemical engineering for decades.

== AIChE William H. Walker Award ==
The American Institute of Chemical Engineers (AIChE) has commemorated Dr. Walker by creating the William H. Walker Award for Excellence in Contributions to Chemical Engineering Literature, described as follows on the AIChE website:

"The award is presented to a member of AIChE who has made an outstanding contribution to chemical engineering literature. The contribution may consist of a review, a history of the development of a process, a theoretical contribution, a research report, or other material of interest and importance to the chemical engineering profession. The recipient must be the author or co-author of an outstanding work in chemical engineering."

The award has been presented every year from 1936 until the present.

== Personal life ==
Walker was born in Pittsburgh to David H. and Anna Blair Walker on April 7, 1869. He died of a heart attack on July 9, 1934, while driving from Bridgton, Maine to Boston, Massachusetts.
