= National Safety Council (India) =

Government agency

- Abbreviation: NSC
- Formation: 4 March 1966
- Purpose: Industrial safety
- Headquarters: Plot No.98-A, Institutional Area, Sector 15, CBD Belapur, Navi Mumbai - 400 614
- Region served: India
- Main organ: Council
- Affiliations: Ministry of Labour, Govt. of India
- Website: Official website

National Safety Council is a premier, non-profit, self-financing and tripartite apex body at the national level in India. It is an autonomous body, which was set up by the Government of India, Ministry of Labour and Employment on 4 March 1966 to generate, develop and sustain a voluntary movement on Safety, Health and Environment (SHE) at the national level. It was registered as a Society under the Societies Registration Act, 1860 and subsequently, as a Public Trust under the Bombay Public Trust Act, 1950.
