= Chemfluence =

Technical symposium in India

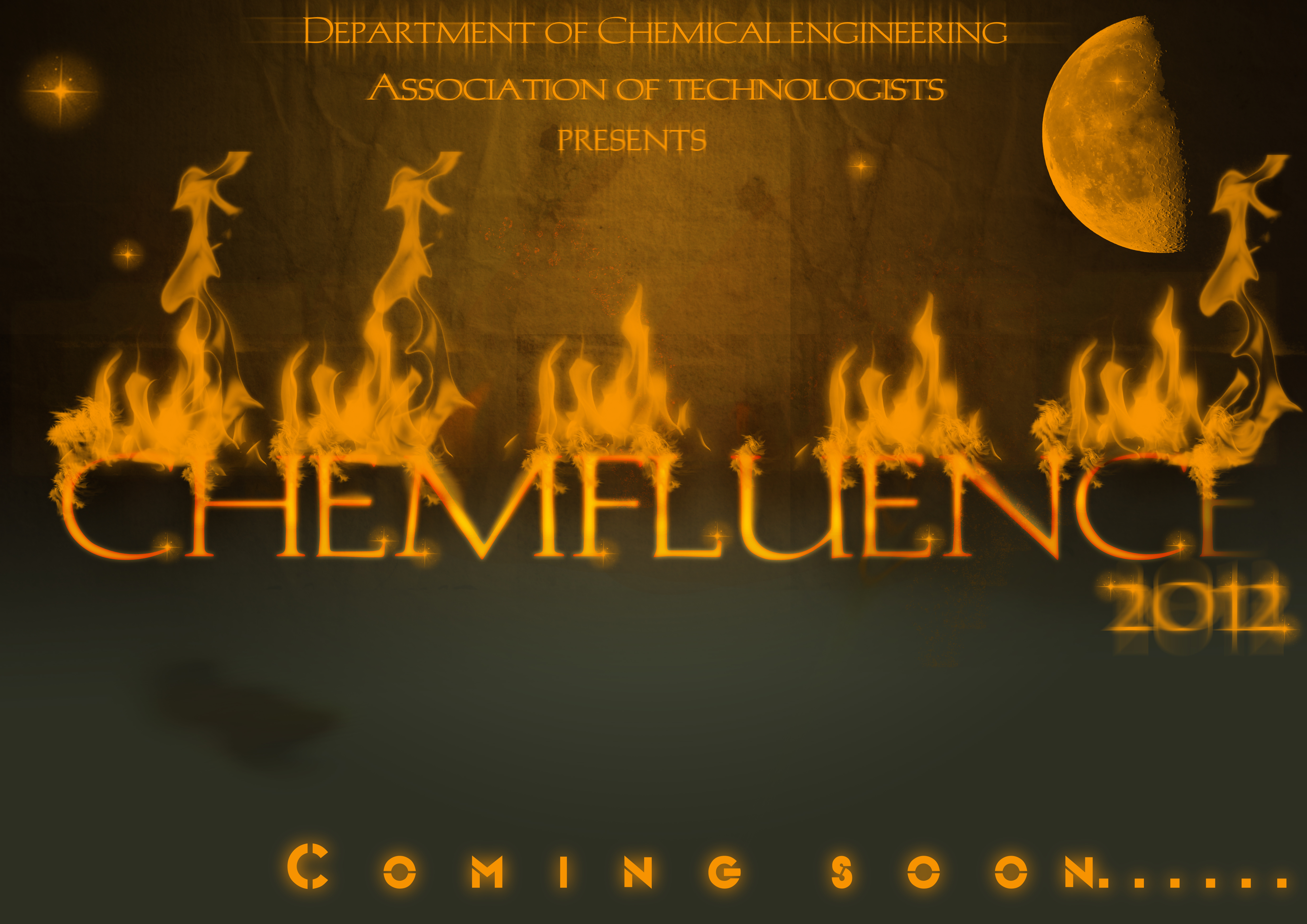
- Genre: National Level Technical Symposium
- Locations: Chennai, India
- Founded: 1994
- Website: Chemfluence 2016

Chemfluence is a national level technical symposium of the Department of Chemical Engineering, Alagappa College of Technology, Anna University, India. It started in 1994 as a college level symposium, and is now in its 29th year. Paper presentations, poster presentations, guest lectures, workshops and events form an integral part of the symposium. The symposium is mainly aimed at chemical engineers and providing an opportunity to showcase their talents. It features more than 20 events across 3 days. It also hosts a cultural fest in association with university departments. Chemfluence is conducted annually by the Association of Chemical Engineers (ACE), the official student body of Department of Chemical Engineering, Anna University.

== About ==
Chemfluence, is a national level technical symposium (Technical and Cultural Events) organized annually by the Association of Chemical Engineers, Department of Chemical Engineering, Alagappa College of Technology, Anna University every year since 1994.

Featuring over 10+ events (both technical and non-technical) is a feature of every Chemfluence.

== History ==
Chemfluence was started in the year 1994 by the students of The Department of Chemical Engineering of Anna University.

== Previous Years ==
=== Chemfluence 2013 ===
Chemfluence for the academic year 2012-2013 was conducted by Department of Chemical Engineering, from 27 February to 1 March 2013.

Some of the major events conducted were:

- Paper Presentation
- Poster Presentation
- Live Model
- Contraption
- Math Modelling
- Monetarist

=== Chemfluence 2014 ===
Chemfluence 2014 was a six-day technical event organized by the students of Department of Chemical Engineering from 25 February to 3 March 2014 under the theme of Energy and Environment. Several Workshops and Guest lectures were conducted to impart practical and technical knowledge to student Engineers. A National Conference on Energy and Environment, EECON'14 was conducted as a part of Chemfluence'14 3 March 2014.

==== Workshops ====
Chemfluence'14 was a platform for several workshops such as

- Programmable Logic Controllers
- Industrial Safety & Risk Analysis
- Statistical Tools for Researchers & Engineers
- Instrumental Methods of Analysis
- Computational Fluid Dynamics
- MATLAB

==== EECON'14 ====
As part of Chemfluence'14, the final day of the symposium was reserved for EECON'14 - the first National Conference on Energy & Environment. Being the first ever symposium to be organised in the university by the student fraternity, the conference begun with the EECON'14 souvenir release and a keynote address by Dr. G. Sekaran, Chief Scientist, CLRI on handling wastes in the tanning sector at the Colin Mckenzie Auditorium. Subsequently, six paper presentation sessions and a poster presentation session were held on a plethora of topics such as Solid Waste Management, Air Pollution Control and Modeling of Environmentally benign processes. Chairpersons for the sessions were personalities high on caliber including Dr. T. Renganathan, Assistant Professor, IIT- Madras, Dr. S. Kanmani, Director, CTDT, Anna University and Dr. M. K. Gowthaman, CLRI amongst many others.

=== Chemfluence 2016 ===
Chemfluence for the academic year 2015-2016 was held from 18 March 2016 to 22 March 2016 based on the theme of waste management. GMW 2k16, A national conference on Global Management of Waste was conducted by the organizing committee consisting of the students and faculties of the Department of Chemical Engineering. Today's industries are in need of innovative ideas and cost cutting techniques to increase the demands for their products in the highly competitive global market with fast depleting resources. With this in concern, Chemfluence ’16 had a theme of Waste Management. Consortium of Chemical Engineers had conducted the following:

- An educational fair
- An alumni meet
- Guest lectures and workshops
- National Conference - Global Management of Waste' (GMW 2k16)'

=== Conference On Global Management of Waste, 'GMW 2k16' ===
GMW 2k16 is the national conference on Global Management of Waste 2016. It is a nationwide congregation of engineering graduates, research scholars and professionals to deal with waste management. The aim of the conference is to generate new perspectives on ways to handle waste. Waste generation is a pressing issue. In India, 94% of waste is being dumped on land. Waste includes Municipal, Agricultural, Industrial, Electronic, fuel waste and land waste. The aim of GMW 2k16 is to explore large scale and cost effective solutions for generating energy from waste.

GMW 2k16 will provide a stage for establishing new waste management related technologies that would "Reform Refuse to Riches". Video presentations will be conducted instead of the poster presentation.

==== Topics ====
- Solid waste management
- Waste to energy
- Bioremediation of waste
- Wastewater treatment and reclamation

=== Chemfluence 2020 ===
Chemfluence 2020 was the Silver Jubilee edition of the technical symposium of the Department of Chemical Engineering of ACTech, Anna University. The three-day symposium was conducted from 24 to 26 February 2020, wherein students from more than 25 colleges took part.

=== Chemfluence 2021 ===
Chemfluence 2021 was the 26th installment of the technical symposium of the Department of Chemical Engineering, Anna University. The event was organized by the student committee, Association of Chemical Engineers.

It was a four-day event conducted from March 15 to March 18 in online mode due to the COVID-19 Pandemic.

The title sponsor for this edition of Chemfluence was Kothari Petrochemicals and was Co-sponsored by Chemfine, Redwood Innovation Partners. Events sponsor was Monitpro Solutions.

The following events were conducted:

- Oral Presentation
- Mock Interview
- Picture Perception
- Chem - Auction
- Chem Connexions
- Solve It - Numerical Questions

=== Chemfluence 2022 ===
Chemfluence 2022 marked the 27th edition of Chemfluence and was organized by the Association of Chemical Engineers from 28 to 30 April 2022. The themes chosen were Carbon Neutrality, Green Energy and Industrial Process Optimization and Safety.

The themes presented were related to the current trend of Environmental Awareness.

The title sponsor for the three-day event was Korcomptenz and was co-sponsored by Ultramarine & Pigments Limited. Event sponsors include Ecolab, Kothari Petrochemicals and Xpro India.

More than 10 technical events including Paper Presentation, Poster Presentation and Workshops were conducted. Workshops on Matlab and Aspen HYSYS were conducted. Events such as Trouble Shooter, Chemcavalier and Chemrelay were some of the key attractions. This edition of Chemfluence witnessed participation of students from about 20 colleges in an around Tamil Nadu.

=== Chemfluence 2023 ===
ACE conducted its 28th year of technical excellence - 'Chemfluence' from April 11 to 13 with a lot more on offer for the students.

Association of Chemical Engineers had chosen Sustainable Development as the theme of this year.

The following technical events were conducted:

- Paper Presentation
- Poster Presentation
- Mock Interview
- Chemcavalier
- Chemextract
- Chem-o-ladders
- Troubleshooter
- Chem Relay
- Who Am I?
- Keep it Safe and Sound
- Pen It Down

Workshops Conducted:

- Start-up Management
- Aspen HYSYS
- Technical Process Safety

There were many other non-technical events also conducted. The title sponsors of the symposium were ONGC, ALCHEMISTS (Alumni Batch 1999-2003) . The event sponsors were CPCL, MUGI, Alumni Batch 2004-2008, Korcomptenz and Indian Oil Corporation.

=== Chemfluence 2024 ===
Chemfluence, in its 29th installment would be a three-day event to be conducted by the Association of Chemical Engineers, in the month of April 2024.

A variety of events are being planned under the themes of Process Intensification, Alternative Energy Sources and Advanced Process Control.

ACE has also planned to conduct a number of workshops including Matlab and Process Control.

This year, mock interviews and placement training would be provided to the second and third year students of Actech to improve their technical knowledge.
