= Alagappa Chettiar College of Engineering and Technology =

College in Karaikudi, Tamil Nadu, India

Alagappa Chettair Government College of Engineering and Technology
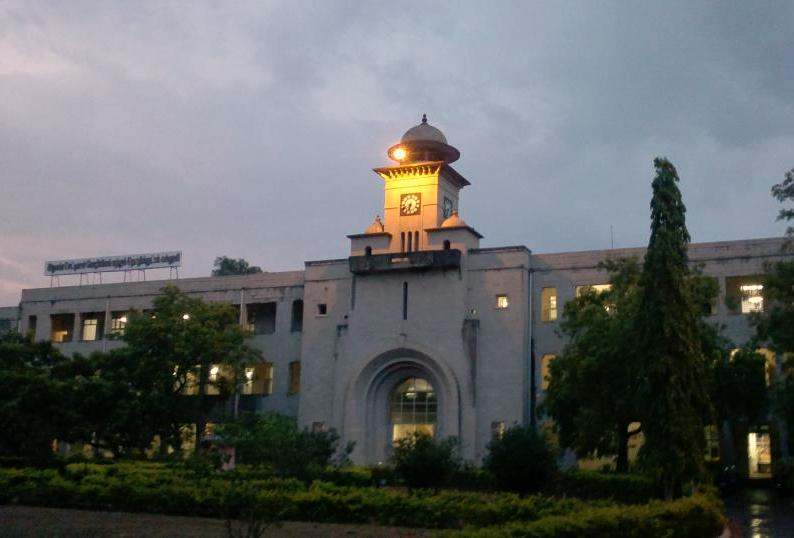
- ACCET Main Building
- Other names: ACCET, ACGCET, A.C. Tech
- Type: Autonomous
- Established: 1952; 74 years ago
- Academic affiliations: Anna University
- Principal: Dr. C. Subramanian
- Location: Karaikudi, Tamil Nadu, India
- Website: https://accet.ac.in/

Alagappa Chettiar Government College of Engineering and Technology (ACGCET-Karaikudi) is an autonomous (with effect from 2009) college of engineering in Karaikudi, Tamil Nadu, India. Established in 1952, it is under the control of the government of the State. The college is a member institute under the TEQIP – Technical Education Quality Improvement Programme in India (7 colleges were selected from Tamil Nadu).

== History ==
RM. Alagappa Chettiar founded Alagappa Chettiar Educational Trust with the aim of developing the backward area of Karaikudi into a centre for higher education.

On 21 July 1952 ACCET started with three faculties – Civil, Mechanical and Electrical and Electronics Engineering under the University of Madras. The foundation for the main building of the college was laid by Rajendra Prasad, the President of India, on 19 February 1953.

- 1966 – The institution was handed over to the government of Tamil Nadu.
- 1969 – A new faculty, Electronics and Communication Engineering was started.
- 1983 – M.E. in Microwave and Optical Engineering started
- 1988 – Master of Computer Application (M.C.A.) started.
- 2001 – B.E. Degree course in Computer Science and Engineering introduced.
- 2025 - B.Tech Degree course in Information Technology introduced.

The institution has been awarded the status of the best engineering college of 2006–07 in Tamil Nadu. Chief Minister M. Karunanidhi honoured the Principal in a function at Anna University, Chennai, on 1 September 2008 for this cause. The college is now affiliated to Anna University, Chennai from 2012. Amenities like Canteen, PostOffice are available.

== Campus facilities ==
=== NRSC building ===
The Non Resident Students Centre Building was declared open on 27 March 1981 for the benefit of day scholars. It houses a couple of spacious dining halls with furniture. A room for the students association and a few guest rooms are also available in the NRSC Building.

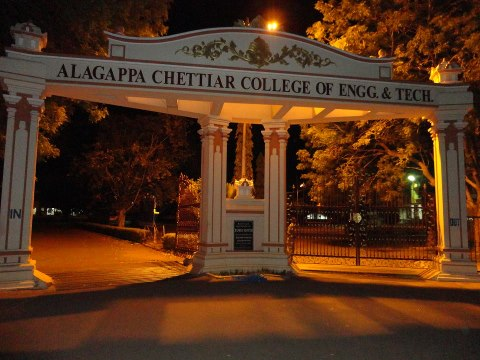
ACCET Entrance on Night Light

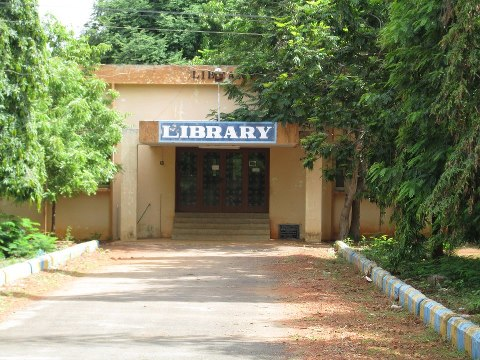
Library in College Campus

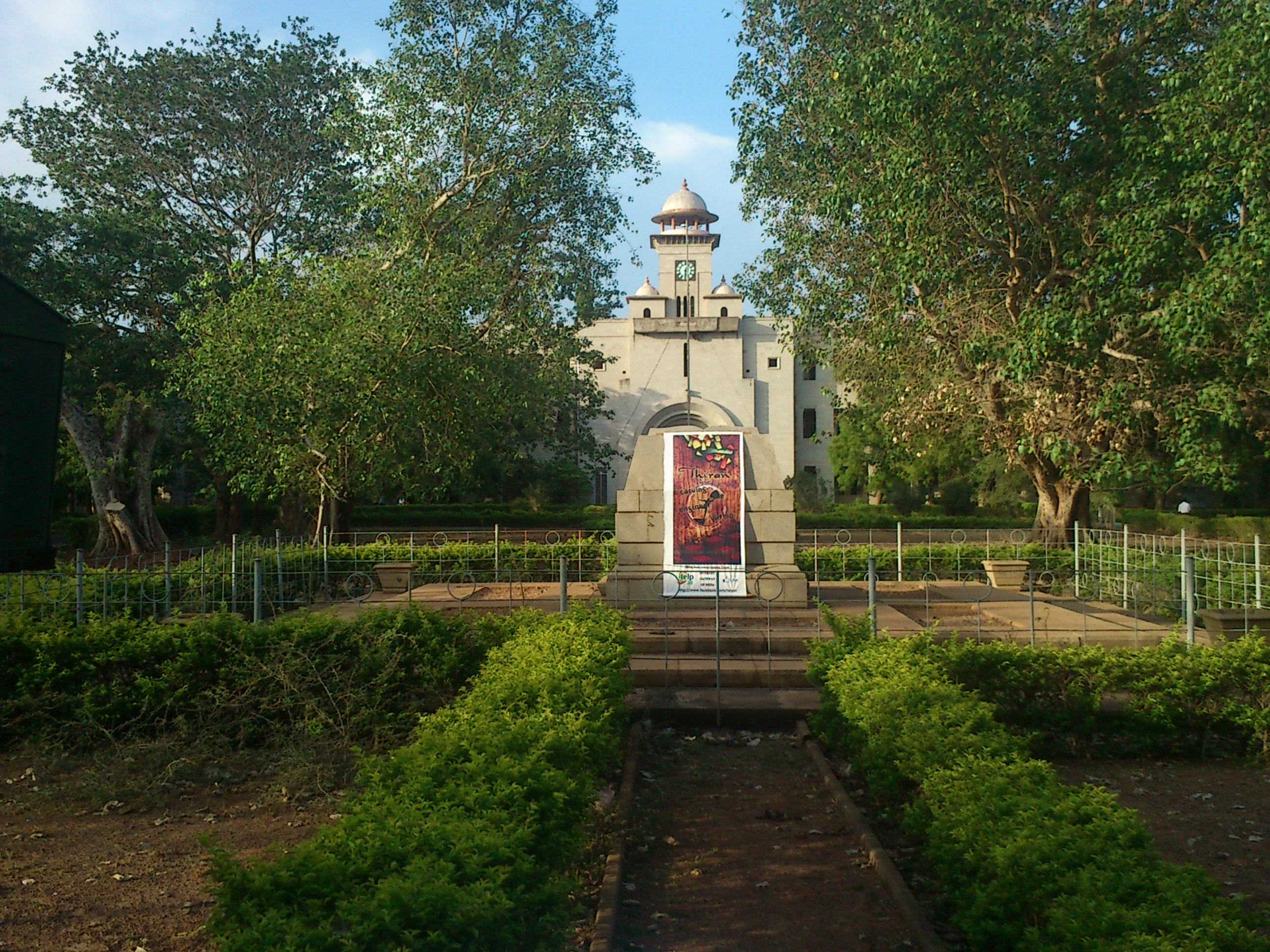
View of Main Building from Entrance

=== Hostel Facility ===
The college also offers separate hostel facilities for both boys and girls. Hostel blocks are situated around the college campus. In order to avoid ragging problem separate hostels for all years are available with watchman available for the whole day

=== Sports and games ===
The college offers facilities for outdoor and indoor games such as cricket, hockey, football, volleyball, basketball, badminton, tennis and table tennis and chess. There is a 400 m track for athletics and the necessary equipment for jumps, throws, power lifting and body building. The membership of the tennis club is open to staff and students of the college. An indoor stadium and gymnasium are also available. To promote sports among the students every year intra-college sports meet is being conducted.

=== Cooperative store ===
Alagappa Chettiar College of Engineering and Technology and Alagappa Polytechnic Students Co-operative Society Limited was registered on 19 January 1956. Every student on admission to the college automatically becomes the member of co-operative store. The store primarily caters to the requirements of the students. A co-operative store with students and staff as members is functioning in the campus. A co-operative thrift society is also functioning in the campus for the benefit of the faculty and staff members of the college.

=== Medical Facilities ===
A dispensary is functioning in the hostel campus with an attached in-patient ward to accommodate students and staff in case of illness. The unit is under the charge of a part-time medical officer assisted by a pharmacist. The dispensary functions during forenoon session on all weekdays except Sunday.

=== Auditorium ===
The college auditorium (Dewan Bahadur Murugappa Hall) is the college auditorium seating a capacity of 600. It also has a spacious stage for conducting cultural programmes and entertainment.

=== Post office ===
Alagappa Engineering College Post Office is located in the college campus. You can avail postal services just in a few steps of walking.

=== Bank ===
You can avail SBI ATM facility in CECRI . Indian Bank ATM and canara bank ATM facility is also situated near the college campus. ICICI bank along with ATM facility is reachable in a few metres in College Road.

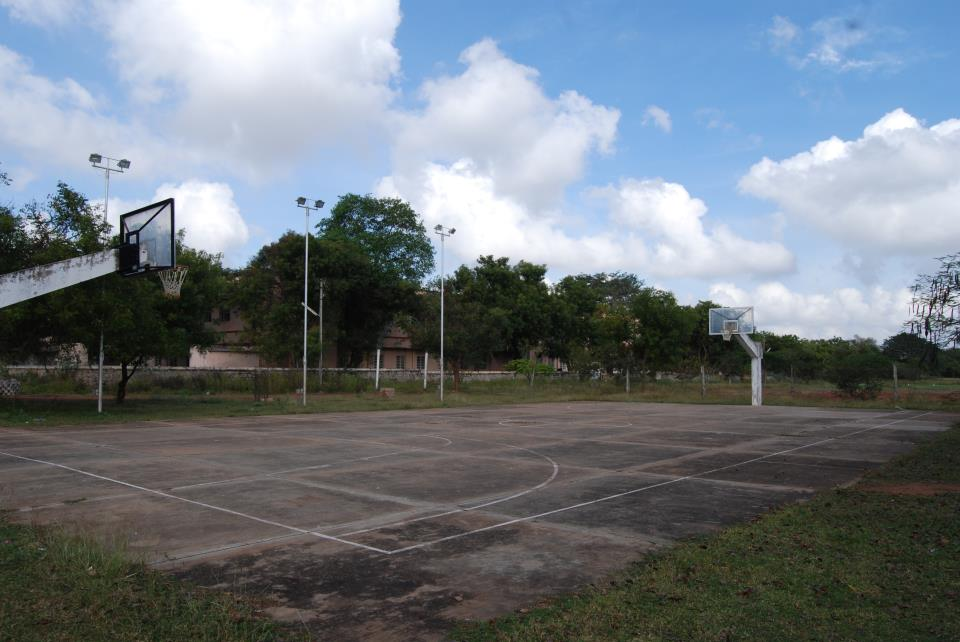
Basket Ball Ground in Campus

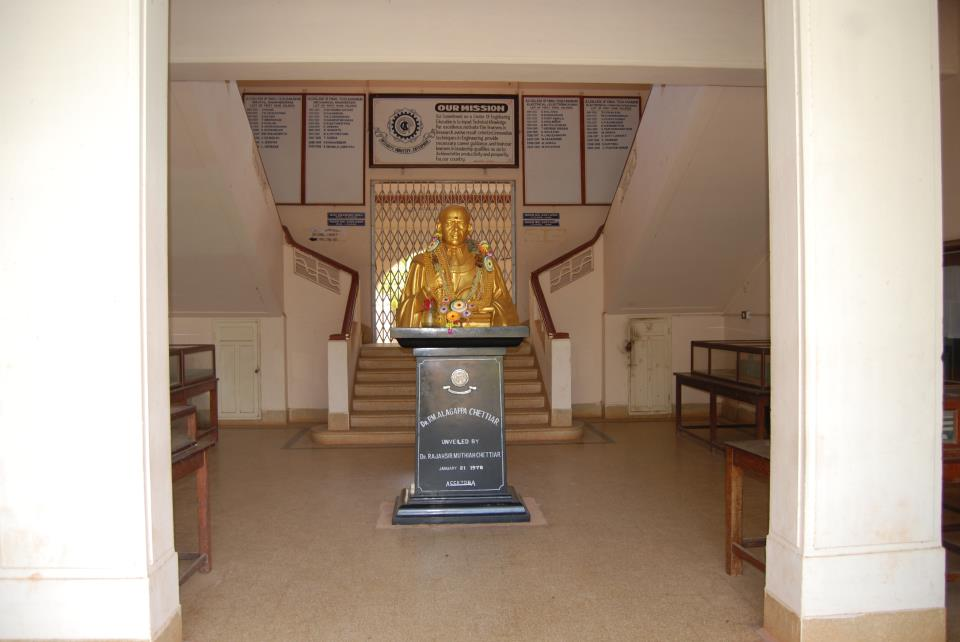
Founder Alagappa Chettiar Statue at Administrative Block

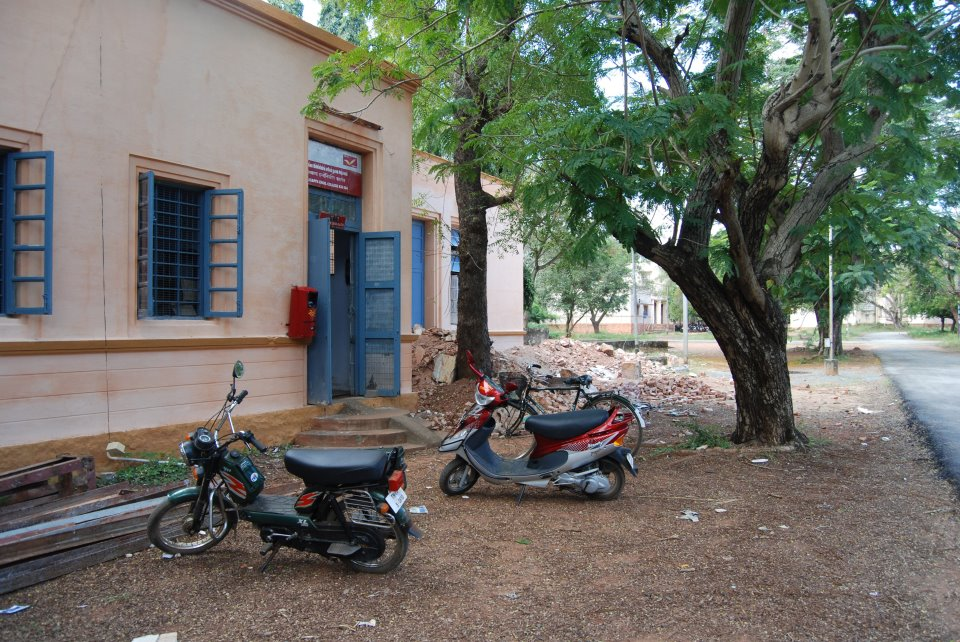
Post Office in Campus

== Organisation and administration ==
=== Principals ===
- 1952–1953, V. S
- 1953–1962, D. S.
- 1962–1964, P. S. Manisundaram
- 1964–1965, A. V.
- 1965–1971, W.
- 1971–1976, S. Srinivasan
- 1976–1977, R. Sridhara Rao
- 1977–1984, N. M. Janardhan
- 1984–1985, S. Narayanaswamy
- 1985–1986, M. M. Rahman
- 1986–1987, T. R. Natesan
- 1987–1988, S. R. Srinivasan
- 1988–1991, A. N. Thomas
- 1991–1993, K. N. Shanmugasundaram
- 1993–1996, P. Balakrishnan
- 1996–1998, E. Ramasamy
- 1999–2000, T. R. Thyagarajan
- 2000–2005, V. M. Periasamy
- 2005–2006, R. Lakshmipathy
- 2006–2009, R. Sundararajan
- 2009–2011, V. Sekaran
- 2011–2012, A. Mala
- 2012–June 2012, Neelakandan
- 2012–2013, A. Mala
- 2013–Feb 2013, Jawahar Pandian
- 2013–2016, A. Mala
- 2016–Jan 2017, Rajkumar
- Feb 2017–May 2019, Dr. A. Elango
- June 2019–June 2020, Dr. R. Shanmugalakshmi
- June 2020–June 2021, Malayalamurthi
- June 2021–December 2021, Dr. K. Manonmani
- December 2021 - February 2024, Dr. P. K. Palani
- February 2022 - March 2026, Dr. K. Baskaran
- March 2026 - July 2026, Dr. A. Sivanantha Raja
- August 2026 - Present, Dr. C. Subramanian

== Student life ==
=== Student associations ===
To encourage the students in extra curricular activities various associations are functioning in the campus, including Freshers' Association, Leo Club, Rotaract Club, Media Club, fine arts association, Tamil mandram and more.

=== Lateral entry counseling ===
The institution is the center for lateral entry admissions every year under Anna University to colleges across Tamil Nadu. Using admissions software developed by its own students, the institute organizes the counseling process (invitation of applications, scrutiny of forms, preparation of merit list, dispatch of call letters and allotment of seats) for direct entry into second year B.E/B.Tech courses all over the state. The team for admissions functions under the leadership of the Principal, who is the secretary for admissions.

=== ACCET alumni ===
The Old Students Association maintains contact between the ex-students of the college and the college itself. It was called as Alagappa Chettiar College of Engineering and Technology Old Boys Association (ACCETOBA) but now it is re-christened as ACCETOSA (Alagappa Chettiar College of Engineering and Technology Old Students Association). To promote the technical skills of the students a project contest called Thiran is conducted in even semesters by the Alumni.

=== Placements ===
Many corporate companies visit regularly for campus interview. First time in the history of ACCET 2004–08 batch Civil Engineering students achieved 100% campus placement. The college shows keen interest in students getting exposed to industries. It has signed MoUs with "Flsmidth" and "Caritor" and has vision to extend its relationship with other industries. ECE department of our college has signed MoU with companies like "VI Microsystem", "Enixs", "Ifutura".

== Notable alumni ==
George Joseph- an Indian space scientist, best known for his contributions to the development of remote sensing technology in India, especially in the field of Earth observation sensors. He is a former chairman of the Lunar Mission Study Task Force of the Indian Space Research Organization and an elected fellow of the National Academy of Sciences, India, Indian Academy of Sciences and Indian National Academy of Engineering. The Government of India awarded him the Padma Bhushan, the third highest civilian award, in 1999.

Narayanan Sankar - was an Indian industrialist and chairman of the Sanmar group, a diversified Indian conglomerate. During a career spanning over five decades, he led the group's diversification into multiple businesses ranging from chemicals to shipping. Sankar had also been the president of the Indian industry organization ASSOCHAM and chairman of the Madras Chamber of Commerce and Industry.Sankar obtained his bachelor's in science from AC College of Technology in Madras (now Chennai) and later went on to get his master's degree in chemical engineering from the Illinois Institute of Technology in Chicago.

Vaidyanatha Ganapati Sthapati- was a Sthapati (temple architect and builder) and head of the College of Architecture and Sculpture in the Vastu Shastra tradition ascribed to the sage Mamuni Mayan.Sthapati attended Dr. Alagappa Chettiar College, Karaikudi, and graduated with a degree in mathematics. After his graduation, he became a Sthapati at Palani Murugan Temple, Palani, Tamil Nadu, India.

Chezhiyan- is an Indian filmmaker and director of photography who works primarily in the Tamil film industry. He received critical acclaim for his work in Kalloori (2007), Paradesi (2013) and To Let (2017).He completed his diploma in civil engineering from Alagappa Chettiar College in Karaikudi. Chezhiyan was also interested in photography right from his early days and was into drawing and painting.

J. K. Rithesh- was an Indian actor and member of the All India Anna Dravida Munnetra Kazhagam.[2] He was a Dravida Munnetra Kazhagam (DMK) Member of Parliament (MP) in the 15th Lok Sabha from Ramanathpuram constituency. In the Indian general elections of 2009, Rithesh received 294,945 votes to defeat his closest rival, Satiyamoorthy of All India Anna Dravida Munnetra Kazhagam (AIADMK) party by a margin of 69,215 votes. On 10 April 2014, he joined AIADMK as a primary member. He died on 13 April 2019, due to heart attack.

== See also ==
- List of Tamil Nadu Government's Educational Institutions
- List of Tamil Nadu Government's Engineering Colleges
