= National Chemical Laboratory =

Chemical laboratory in Pune, India

CSIR-National Chemical Laboratory
- राष्ट्रीय रासायनिक प्रयोगशाला
- Established: 1950
- Field of research: Chemical Sciences
- Director: Ashish Lele
- Staff: ≈200 (PhD)
- Students: 400 doctoral
- Location: Pashan Road, Pune, Maharashtra, 411008, India; 18.541598°N 73.81065°E
- Campus: Urban
- Operating agency: Council of Scientific and Industrial Research
- Website: www.ncl-india.org

The National Chemical Laboratory (NCL) is an Indian government laboratory based in Pune, in western India.

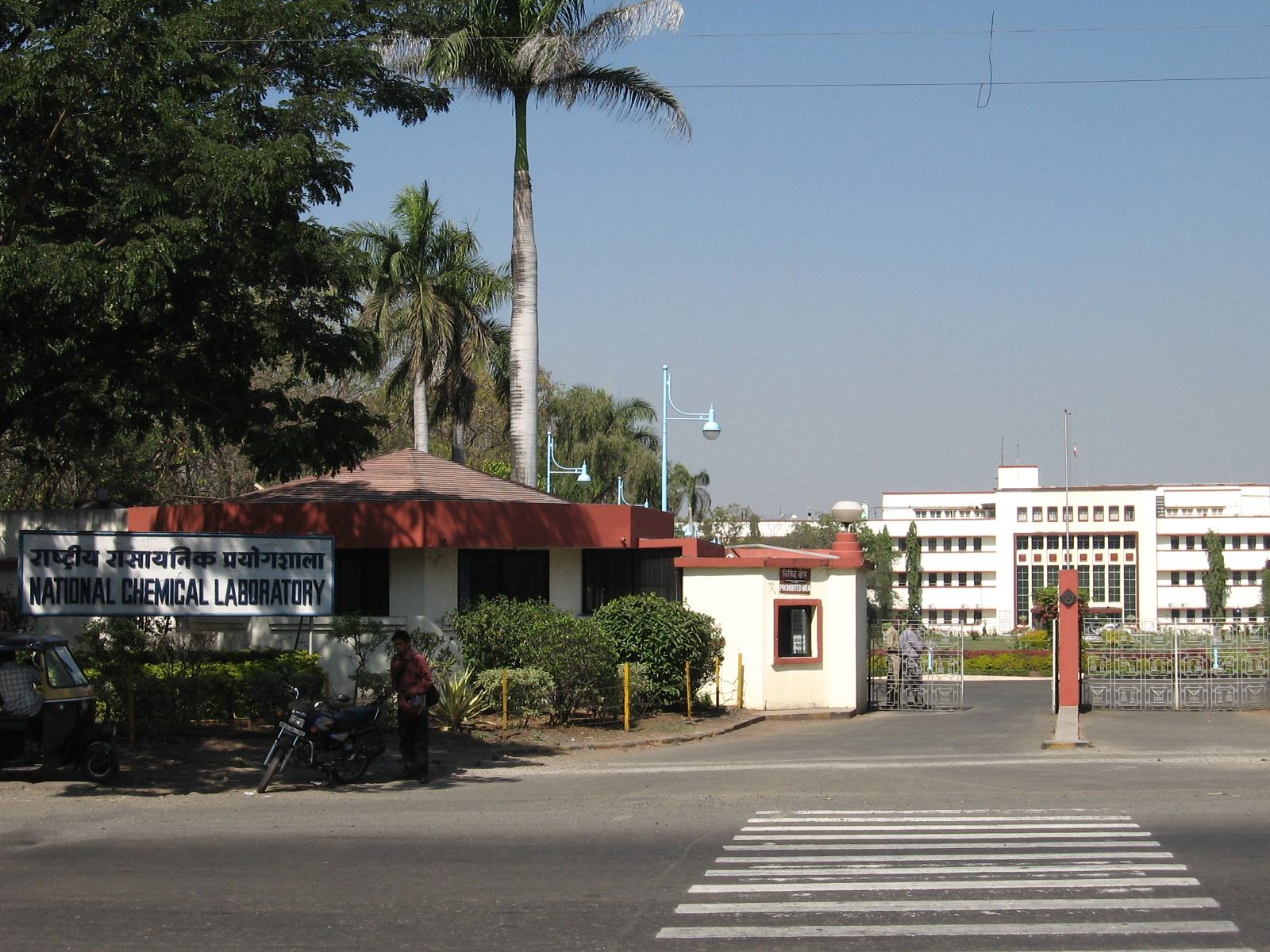
NCL Pune

Popularly known as NCL, a constituent member of the Council of Scientific & Industrial Research (CSIR) India, it was established in 1950. Dr Ashish Lele is the Director of NCL and took charge on 1 April 2021. There are approximately 200 scientific staff working here. The interdisciplinary research center has a wide research scope and specializes in polymer science, organic chemistry, catalysis, materials chemistry, chemical engineering, biochemical sciences and process development. It houses good infrastructure for measurement science and chemical information.

National Collection of Industrial Microorganisms (NCIM) is located here and is a microbial culture repository maintaining a variety of industrially important microbial culture stock.

There are about 400 graduate students pursuing research towards doctoral degree; about 50 students are awarded Ph.D. degree every year; and the young talent pool adds in every few years.

NCL publishes over 400 research papers annually in the field of chemical sciences and over 60 patents worldwide. It is a unique source of research education producing the largest number of PhDs in chemical sciences within India.

== Research Groups in NCL ==
- Physical & Materials Chemistry
- Catalysis & Inorganic Chemistry
- Chemical Engineering and Process Development
- Polymer Science & Engineering
- Organic Chemistry
- Biochemical Sciences

== Facilities ==
=== PES Modern English School ===
NCL has a primary and secondary school within its premises. Established in 1985 as the NCL School, it has since been renamed the 'Progressive Education Society's Modern English School'. Since 2006 it has been extended to include a junior college.

=== Dispensary ===
NCL also has a Dispensary inside its premises which provides free of charge medical assistance to NCL employees and dependants under the CGHS.

== Past directors ==
The organization was headed by many notable scientists since inception.

- James William McBain (1950-1952)
- George Finch (1952-1957)
- Krishnasami Venkataraman (1957-1966)
- Bal Dattatreya Tilak (1966-1978)
- L. K. Doraiswamy (1978-1989)
- Raghunath Mashelkar (1989-1995)
- Paul Ratnasamy (1995-2002)
- Swaminathan Sivaram (2002-2010)
- Sourav Pal (2010-2015)
- K. Vijayamohanan Pillai (2015-2016)
- Ashwini Nangia (2016-2020)
- S.Chandrasekhar (2020-2021)
- Ashish Kishore Lele ( 2021-Present)

== Notable alumni ==
- Kallam Anji Reddy founder of Dr. Reddy's Laboratories.
- B. D. Kulkarni: Known for work on fluidized bed reactor.
