= Muslim Association for the Advancement of Science =

The Muslim Association for the Advancement of Science (MAAS) is an association of Muslim scientists focused on promoting the advancement of science and technology among Muslims. It was established in India by M. Z. Kirmani in 1983.

== Mission ==
The mission of the Muslim Association for the Advancement of Science is to instill the spirit of education, science, and technology research as socially obligatory, or farḍ kifāyah in Islamic terminology. In addition to this, MAAS seeks to instill the accompanying scientific values into the mindset of Indian Muslims in general, and Muslim scientists in particular. MAAS publishes the Journal of Islamic Science.
