= Chemplast Sanmar =

Indian chemical company

Coordinates: 13°2′43.3″N 80°15′28.3″E

Chemplast Sanmar Limited
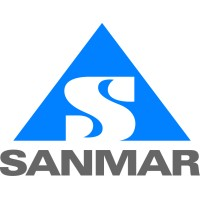
- Company type: Public
- Traded as: BSE: 543336 NSE: CHEMPLASTS
- ISIN: INE488A01050
- Industry: Chemicals
- Founded: 1967; 59 years ago
- Headquarters: Chennai, Tamil Nadu, India
- Revenue: ▲₹59.49 billion (US$620 million) (FY22)
- Net income: ▲₹6.48 billion (US$68 million) (FY22)
- Website: chemplastsanmar.com

Chemplast Sanmar Limited is an Indian chemical company. It is a major manufacturer of PVC resins, chlorochemicals and piping systems.

== History ==
The company was formed in 1962 to manufacture PVC resins/compounds and fabricate PVC products. In 1967 a PVC Plant at Mettur was commissioned with a capacity of 6,000 TPA, in collaboration with BF Goodrich. PVC pipes production commenced. It was among the pioneers to bring PVC pipes to India.

In 1985 the company acquired a controlling stake of Mettur Chemical & Industrial Corporation (MCIC) Ltd.

The Cuddalore PVC project was commissioned in September 2009.

In August 2021, Chemplast Sanmar opened its initial public offering at a price band of ₹ 530-541 per share.

== Organization ==
Chemplast Sanmar Limited is part of Sanmar Group which has businesses in Chemicals, Shipping, Engineering and Metals. It has a turnover of over ₹ 65 billion and a presence in some 25 businesses, with manufacturing units spread over numerous locations in India.

Chemplast Sanmar's manufacturing facilities are located at Mettur, Panruti, Cuddalore and Ponneri in Tamil Nadu, Shinoli in Maharashtra, and Karaikal in the Union Territory of Puducherry.

Cuddalore PCV is the largest such project in Tamil Nadu. Its aggregate capacity of 235,000 tons makes it one of India's largest PVC players.

Mettur Chemical & Industrial Corporation (MCIC) Ltd makes caustic soda 48000 TPA and chloromethane 11000 TPA.

=== Zero liquid discharge ===
Chemplast Sanmar implemented zero liquid discharge in all its manufacturing plants. Chemplast has not discharged treated effluent since September 2009 in Mettur while Cuddalore and Karaikkal have never discharged treated effluent.

== Recognition ==
- "Innovative Case Study" at the 7th National Award for Excellence in Water Management (2010)
- "Excellent Water Efficient Unit" 7th National Award for Excellence in Water Management (2010) for the successful case study of zero liquid discharge at Mettur.

== Sports ==
The Sanmar Group has supported cricket for over 50 years. Chemplast Sanmar supports Jolly Rovers and the Alwarpet Cricket Club in the Tamil Nadu Cricket Academy (TNCA) 1st Division.
