= Vivek Ranade =

Indian scientist

Prof. Vivek Ranade
- Born: 15 October 1963 (age 62); Maharashtra, India
- Education: Institute of Chemical Technology; University of Bombay
- Known for: Studies on bubble column, stirred and trickle-bed reactors
- Awards: 1992 CSIR Young Scientist Award; 1996 INAE Young Engineer Award; 2003 AVRA Young Scientist Award; 2004 Herdillia Award; 2004 Shanti Swarup Bhatnagar Prize; 2005 CHEMTECH Award; 2011 UAA-ICT Distinguished Alumnus Award; 2014 VASVIK award
- Scientific career
- Fields: Fluid dynamics; Flow Reactors; Scale Up
- Workplaces: ETH Zurich; Delft University of Technology; University of Twente; National Chemical Laboratory; Queens University of Belfast; University of Limerick

Vivek Vinayak Ranade (born 1963) is an Indian chemical engineer, entrepreneur, professor of chemical engineering at the School of Chemistry and Chemical Engineering of the Queen's University, Belfast and chair professor of process engineering at the Bernal Institute of the University of Limerick . He is a former chair professor and deputy director of the National Chemical Laboratory, Pune. He is known for his work on bubble column, stirred and trickle-bed reactors and is an elected fellow of the Indian Academy of Sciences, Indian National Science Academy. and the Indian National Academy of Engineering. The Council of Scientific and Industrial Research, the apex agency of the Government of India for scientific research, awarded him the Shanti Swarup Bhatnagar Prize for Science and Technology, one of the highest Indian science awards for his contributions to Engineering Sciences in 2004. (Note: Long link - please select award year to see details)

== Biography ==
Ranade, born on 15 October 1963 at Jalgaon in the Indian state of Maharashtra to Vinayak Bhagwant Ranade and Vijaya, did his graduate studies at the Department of Chemical Technology (present day Institute of Chemical Technology) of the University of Bombay from where he earned the degree of BTech in chemical engineering in 1983, passing the examination with the third rank and followed it up with a PhD from the same institution in 1988. He did his postdoctoral studies at ETH Zurich as a research associate during 1988–90 and on his return to India, he started his career by joining National Chemical Laboratory, Pune (NCL), a CSIR institution, as a Scientist (Grade C). He served NCL for over 26 years holding various grades from Grade C to H, till he became the deputy director of the institution in 2010, a position he held till July 2016. In between he had two sabbaticals abroad, first at the Faculty of Applied Physics of Delft University of Technology during 1993–94 and the other at the Faculty of Chemical Technology of the University of Twente during 1997–98, and is a professor of chemical engineering at Queens University of Belfast since August 2016. He also serves as an adjunct professor Institute of Chemical Technology and as an outstanding professor at Academy of Scientific and Innovative Research (AcSIR).

Ranade is married to Nanda (née Nanda Vijayanand Kher), an academic, and the couple has one child, Vishakha. The family lives in Belfast.

== Legacy ==
Representation of a bubble column reactor

Ranade has worked on various aspects of fluid dynamics such as multiphase flows and Reactors, computational flow modelling and process intensification and has developed Computational fluid dynamics models with regard to various types of reactors like bubble column, stirred and trickle bed varieties. His models are known to be capable of predicting unsteady and time-averaged flow characteristics of reactors and has assisted in enhancing performance of the industrial reactors. He and his colleagues developed many software / simulators such as ReST, MoBB, TRPro, PoRE, RoCKS, AnTS, BOaST and contributed to the development of products like MiST and CFD. His contributions are also reported in the development of water treatment devices utilizing diodes, conductivity probes and micro-reactors. He has documented his researches by way of several articles; (Note: Please see Articles section) Google Scholar and ResearchGate, online article repositories of scientific articles, have listed many of them. Besides, he has authored four books viz. Computational Flow Modeling for Chemical Reactor Engineering, Trickle Bed Reactors: Reactor Engineering and Applications, Industrial Wastewater Treatment, Recycling and Reuse and Computational Modeling of Pulverized Coal Fired Boilers.

Ranade heads a team of scientists who have launched MAGIC (modular, agile, intensified and continuous) processes and plants, A CSIR-sponsored program for identifying and developing upscale processes for manufacturing specialty chemicals. He holds several patents for products and processes he has developed, under the aegis of NCL and others. He was instrumental in the establishment of the first start-up at NCL Venture Center in 2006 under the name, Tridiagonal Solutions Pvt. Ltd., where he served as the chief executive officer during 2008–10 and as its chairman thereafter. He was a member of the group who founded Vivira Process Technologies Pvt. Ltd. in 2015 for marketing vortex diodes and is involved with Wiseco Systems Pvt. Ltd., a start-up involved in the development of wireless sensing and control solutions. He is an associate editor of Industrial & Engineering Chemistry Research journal of Elsevier and sits in the editorial boards of Chemical Engineering Research and Design (Elsevier) and Indian Chemical Engineer (Taylor & Francis). He is also a member of the Senate of the Academy of Scientific and Innovative Research.

=== Selected Patents ===
- Apparatus and Method for Reduction in Ammoniacal Nitrogen from Waste Waters

Relates to an effluent treatment methodology using an apparatus with vortex diode. The method claims to reduce ammoniacal nitrogen content of waste water.

- Tube in Tube Continuous Glass-lined Reactor

A corrosion-resistant glass-lined metal reactor with tube in tube design claimed to have higher heat transfer efficiency.

- Continuous Modular Reactor

Design of a continuous flow reactor reported to have enhanced processing efficiency while retaining agility and re-configurability of the continuous chemical processes.

- Vortex Diodes as Effluent Treatment Devices

Design of a vortex diode with enhanced ability to generate strong vortex, thereby increasing the rate of reactions and efficiency.

- Apparatus for Filtration and Disinfection of Sea Water/ship's Ballast Water and a Method of Same

Design of an apparatus for filtering and disinfecting the ballast water of ships. It deploys hydrodynamic cavitation and includes a vortex diode.

== Awards and honors ==
Ranade, whose doctoral thesis won the Best Thesis Award of ICT Mumbai in 1988, received the Young Scientist Award of the Council of Scientific and Industrial Research in 1992. Four years later, he was chosen for the 1996 Young Engineer Award of the Indian National Academy of Engineering. He received the AVRA Young Scientist Award of the A. V. Rama Rao Research Foundation in 2003 and the Council of Scientific and Industrial Research awarded him the Shanti Swarup Bhatnagar Prize, one of the highest Indian science awards in 2004. He received one more honor in 2004 in the form of Herdillia Award for Excellence in Basic Research in Chemical Engineering of the Indian Institute of Chemical Engineers followed by the CHEMTECH Outstanding Contribution Award in Chemical Engineering of the Chemtech Foundation in 2005. He received another award from the Council of Scientific and Industrial Research selected him as the Outstanding Scientist of the Year in 2010. His alma mater, UDCT honored him with the UAA Distinguished Alumnus Award in 2011 and he received VASVIK Industrial Research Award in Chemical Sciences and Technology in 2014.

Ranade was selected for the Young Associate-ship of the Indian Academy of Sciences in 1994 and he received research support from the Department of Science and Technology by way of Swarnajayanti Fellowship in 1999. The Maharashtra Academy of Sciences elected him as a fellow in 2001 and the Indian National Academy of Engineering followed suit in 2005. Two major Indian science academies viz Indian Academy of Sciences and the Indian National Science Academy elected him as their fellow in 2011 and 2016 respectively.

== Selected bibliography ==
=== Books ===
- Vivek V. Ranade (2002). Computational Flow Modeling for Chemical Reactor Engineering. Academic Press. ISBN 978-0-12-576960-0.
- Vivek V. Ranade; Raghunath Chaudhari; Prashant R. Gunjal (18 March 2011). Trickle Bed Reactors: Reactor Engineering and Applications. Elsevier. ISBN 978-0-08-093144-9.
- Vivek V. Ranade; Vinay M Bhandari (21 July 2014). Industrial Wastewater Treatment, Recycling and Reuse. Elsevier Science. ISBN 978-0-444-63403-0.
- Vivek V. Ranade; Devkumar F. Gupta (2 December 2014). Computational Modeling of Pulverized Coal Fired Boilers. CRC Press. ISBN 978-1-4822-1535-9.

=== Articles ===
- Kulkarni, A. A.; Gorasia, A. K.; Ranade, V. V. (2007). "Hydrodynamics and liquid phase residence time distribution in mesh microreactor". Chemical Engineering Science. 62 (24): 7484–7493. Bibcode:2007ChEnS..62.7484K. doi:10.1016/j.ces.2007.08.063.
- Kasat, G. R.; Khopkar, A. R.; Ranade, V. V.; Pandit, A. B. (2008). "CFD simulation of liquid-phase mixing in solid-liquid stirred reactor". Chemical Engineering Science. 63 (15): 3877–3885. Bibcode:2008ChEnS..63.3877K. doi:10.1016/j.ces.2008.04.018.
- Kulkarni, Amol A.; Ranade, Vivek V.; Rajeev, R.; Koganti, S. B. (2009). "Pressure drop across vortex diodes: experiments and design guidelines". Chemical Engineering Science. 64 (6): 1285–1292. Bibcode:2009ChEnS..64.1285K. doi:10.1016/j.ces.2008.10.060.
- Sardeshpande, Madhavi V.; Juvekar, Vinay A.; Ranade, Vivek V. (2010). "Hysteresis in cloud heights during solid suspension in stirred tank reactor: experiments and CFD simulations". AIChE Journal. 56 (11): 2795–2804. Bibcode:2010AIChE..56.2795S. doi:10.1002/aic.12191.
- Sardeshpande, Madhavi V.; Juvekar, V. A.; Ranade, Vivek V. (2011). "Solid suspension in stirred tanks: UVP measurements and CFD simulations". Canadian Journal of Chemical Engineering. 89 (5): 1112–1121. doi:10.1002/cjce.20548.

== See also ==
- Vorticity
- Computational modeling
- Sewage treatment
- Cavitation
