= Maarten Maartens =

Dutch writer, writing in English (1858–1915)

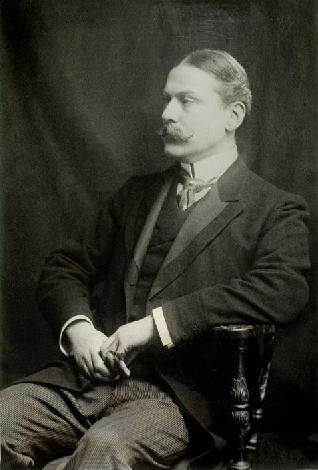
- Born: 15 August 1858; Amsterdam, Netherlands
- Died: 3 August 1915 (aged 56); Doorn, Netherlands
- Occupations: Novelist, poet, playwright, short-story writer
- Spouse: Anna van Vollenhoven
- Writing career
- Language: English

Signature
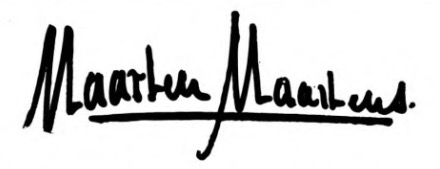

Maarten Maartens, pen name of Jozua Marius Willem van der Poorten Schwartz (15 August 1858 in Amsterdam – 3 August 1915 in Doorn), was a Dutch writer, who wrote in English. He was quite well known at the end of the nineteenth and the beginning of the twentieth century, in both the UK and the US, but he was soon forgotten after his death.

== Biography ==
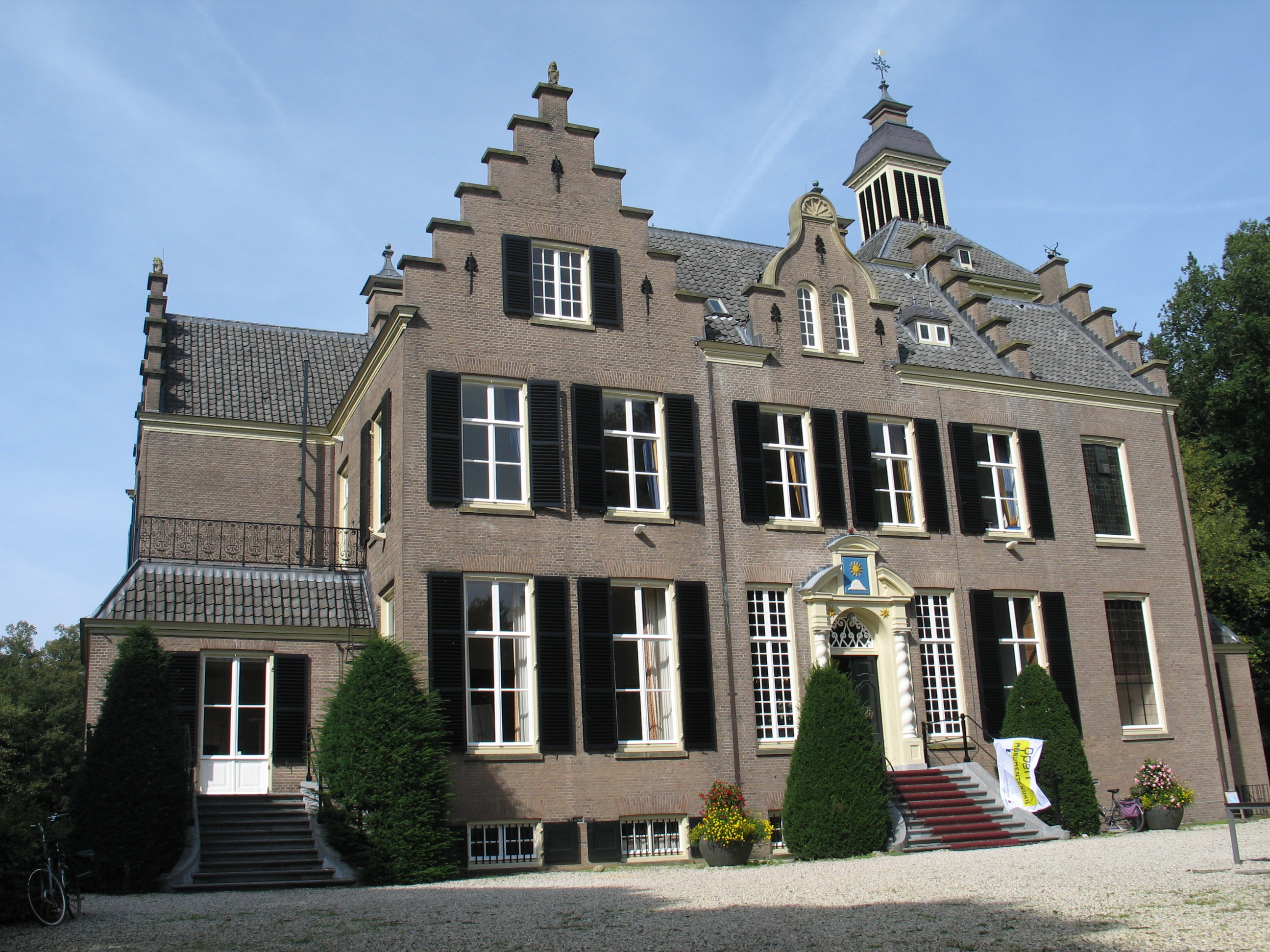
Het Maarten Maartenshuis.

The author was born on 15 August 1858 in Amsterdam as Jozua Marius Willem Schwartz. His friends and relations called him Joost. His father August Ferdinand Carl Schwartz (1817–1870) was a vicar at the Scottish Missionary Church. Jozua's father was originally Jewish, but had converted to Christianity. He became a clergyman with the special task of convincing other Jews to take the same step.

In 1864 the family Schwartz moved to London, where Jozua's father started missionary work among the London Jews. Jozua owed his skill in the English language to this stay in England. When Jozua's father died in 1870, the family at first returned to Amsterdam and then went to Bonn in Germany. In 1877 Jozua Schwartz finished his grammar school education there.

He returned to the Netherlands, where he studied law at Utrecht University. In 1882 he took his PhD Shortly afterwards he stood in for his instructor, Professor Jacobus Anthonie Fruin, who had fallen ill. When Fruin died in 1884, Jozua Schwartz applied for his position, but was not selected.

In 1883 Jozua Schwartz had married his cousin Anna van Vollenhoven (1862–1924). She belonged to a rich Amsterdam family. Thanks to the money she brought into the marriage Jozua never had to look for a job.

Both Jozua and Anna suffered from bad health. Jozua Schwartz later used their manifold experiences with doctors in his novels The Healers and The New Religion.

The couple travelled extensively, often to health resorts. When Anna became too weak to accompany him, Jozua mostly took his butler with him, and later his daughter Ada (1888–1944).

In 1884 Jozua Schwartz bought a rural estate in Doorn, a small town in the central Netherlands. There he ordered a small castle built, partly after his own design. The castle was finished in 1903. He called it Zonheuvel ('Sun Hill').

In 1889 Jozua Schwartz got permission to add the name Van der Poorten (one of his great-grandmothers went by that name) to his own name. From then on he was called Jozua Marius Willem van der Poorten Schwartz.

Van der Poorten Schwartz was deeply shocked when World War I broke out in 1914. He fell into a depression and his state of health deteriorated quickly. On 3 August 1915 he died. His wife Anna, who had always been even more frail than he was, outlived him for nine years.

Their daughter Ada, who never married, rechristened Zonheuvel Het Maarten Maartenshuis ('The Maarten Maartens House') and turned it into a conference centre. Some rooms, among them the library, have been left in the state they were in when 'Maarten Maartens' was still living.

== Literary career ==
Maarten Maartens wrote novels, short stories, plays and poems. He started his literary career in the years 1885–1888. In those years he published two collections of poems and two tragedies in verse, in English, his second language, and with a British publisher (three of them with Remington & Co). He still wrote under his own name (then J.M.W. Schwartz).

His British friend Reginald Stanley Faber suggested he could write prose as well. Jozua Schwartz took the suggestion to heart. In 1889 he published two novels, both with Remington & Co and in English. The first one was a detective story entitled The Black Box Murder. With this book he was one of the first Dutch authors who wrote a detective story, albeit in English. The novel did not mention an author; the title page said: 'The Black Box Murder by the Man Who Discovered the Murderer'.

The second book, The Sin of Joost Avelingh, was the first one he published under the pen name of Maarten Maartens. He chose that name because it sounded very Dutch, was easy to remember and for non-Dutch speakers also easy to pronounce.

The Sin of Joost Avelingh was set in the Netherlands and depicted Dutch society. The book was a big success and went through several editions. The next year D. Appleton & Company printed an American edition. The book was translated into German, Danish, Italian, French and Dutch.

All subsequent books were published under the name of Maarten Maartens and in English, both in the UK and the US. In this way Maartens published fourteen novels and four books of short stories. Most books are set in the Netherlands. His best known novel is God's Fool (1892); he himself considered The Price of Lis Doris (1909) to be his best book. Most of his books were translated into German, a few of them also into Dutch. None of the Dutch editions were successful.

In both the UK and the US Maarten Maartens was a popular writer, whose novels went through several reprints. He regularly visited the UK and was on friendly terms with British writers like Thomas Hardy, George Meredith and George Bernard Shaw. Among his best friends were J.M. Barrie, Edmund Gosse and the publisher George Bentley. Bentley was in some respects Maartens's critical councillor. On receiving the first draft of The Greater Glory he advised Maartens to rewrite the second and third volumes, as Maartens too clearly showed his dislike of one of its characters, Count Rexelaer. Maartens followed Bentley's advice. Maartens's popularity in the UK is evident from the fact that he was elected an honorary member of the English Authors Club in 1891. In 1905 he received an honorary doctorship at the University of Aberdeen, together with Thomas Hardy.

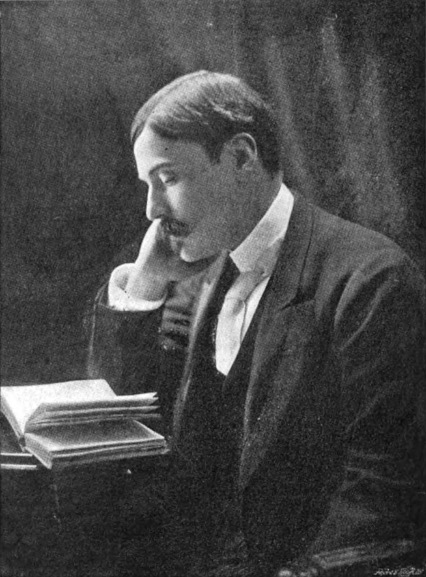
Photo of Maartens in the August-September 1895 edition of The Bookman (New York City)

After 1905 the sales figures of Maartens's books started to decline. He still was a welcome guest in the English-speaking world though. In 1907 he visited the United States. He attended the opening of an enlargement to the Carnegie Museum of Art at Pittsburgh and on 12 April delivered a speech there. A few days later, on 15 April, he spoke at the New York Peace Congress, organised by Andrew Carnegie. Maartens had met Carnegie during his visits to the UK. Maartens was even received by President Theodore Roosevelt at the White House.

In 1914 the collected works of Maarten Maartens were published with Constable & Co. in London. A somewhat less complete edition was published with Tauchnitz in Leipzig in the series 'Tauchnitz Collection of British and American Authors' (in English!). D. Appleton & Company, his American publisher, refused to print an American edition. Maartens's books did not sell anymore.

In the same year, 1914, Maarten Maartens published his only work in Dutch: a bundle of poems under the nom de plume of Joan van den Heuvel ('John of the Hill', a pun on 'Zonheuvel', the name of his castle).

After the outbreak of the First World War and Maartens's death in 1915 the publishers lost interest in his work and he fell into oblivion. In 1930 though his daughter Ada van der Poorten Schwartz, who managed his literary estate, succeeded in having a selection of his letters published.

Because he wrote all his works – one collection of poems excepted – in English, he was hardly known in his own country, the Netherlands. Among his compatriots, who had heard of him, but never read him, a rumour spread that his novels were romans à clef and meant to ridicule the Netherlands. Maartens was annoyed by this rumour, as the preface to The Greater Glory (1894) clearly shows:

'Holland is a small country, and it is difficult to step out in it without treading on somebody’s toes. I therefore wish to declare, once for all, and most emphatically, that my books contain no allusions, covert or overt, to any real persons, living or dead. I am aware that great masters of fiction have thought fit to work from models; that method must therefore possess its advantages: it is not mine.'

But it was in the Netherlands where, after his death, some attempts were made to renew interest in his works. Since 1930 two novels and two short story books have been published in Dutch translations. None of them was successful, most likely because Maartens had remained unknown and unpopular in the Netherlands, while times had changed and readers with them. On 26 September 2015, in memory of Maarten Maartens' passing a hundred years ago, a symposium was held in the Maarten Maartens House in Doorn, The Netherlands, commemorating his writings and writer's life. This was accompanied by a number of activities, including a concert event in the Maartens Church in Doorn with singing and piano accompaniment based on Maartens' texts, directed by Jurriaan Röntgen, grandson of the well-known German-Dutch composer, Julian Röntgen, and a member of the Schwartz family. The Dutch translation of God's Fool was reprinted and Bouwe Postmus presented his book, "At Home and Abroad; Stories of Love," a collection of Maarten's short stories published by the author in well-known magazines. For that same occasion, his nephew, John Schwartz, published his book, "Maarten Maartens Rediscovered - The Most Popular Dutch Author Abroad," which contains summarizations of Maartens' thirteen novels, with quotations from Maartens' writing. A year later, in 2016, Schwartz published the second part, "Maarten Maartens Rediscovered - His Best Short Stories," a summarization with quotations of thirty-two short stories selected from Maartens' four published volumes of short stories, as well as The Black Box Murder, Maartens' first self-published detective.

== Bibliography ==
=== Poetry (in English) ===
- The Morning of a Love, and Other Poems, Remington & Co, London, 1885
- A Sheaf of Sonnets, Remington & Co, London, 1888

=== Poetry (in Dutch) ===
- Gedichten ('Poems'), P.N. van Kampen & Zoon, Amsterdam, 1914

=== Novels ===
- The Black Box Murder, Remington & Co, London, 1889
- The Sin of Joost Avelingh: A Dutch Story, Remington & Co, London, 1889; D. Appleton & Company, New York, 1890
- An Old Maid's Love: A Dutch Tale Told in English, Richard Bentley & Son, London; Harper & Brothers, New York, 1891
- A Question of Taste: A Novel, William Heinemann, London, 1891
- God's Fool: A Koopstad Story, Richard Bentley & Son, London; D. Appleton & Company, New York, 1892
- The Greater Glory: A Story of High Life, Richard Bentley & Son, London; D. Appleton & Company, New York, 1894
- My Lady Nobody: A Novel, Richard Bentley & Son, London; Harper & Brothers, New York, 1895
- Her Memory, Macmillan & Co., London; D. Appleton & Company, New York, 1898
- Dorothea: A Story of the Pure in Heart, Constable & Co., London; D. Appleton & Company, New York, 1904
- The Healers, Constable & Co., London; D. Appleton & Company, New York, 1906
- The New Religion, Methuen & Co., London; D. Appleton & Company, New York, 1907
- The Price of Lis Doris, D. Appleton & Company, New York; Methuen & Co., London, 1909
- Harmen Pols, Peasant, Methuen & Co., London; John Lane Company, New York, 1910
- Eve: An Incident of Paradise Regained, Constable & Co., London, 1912

=== Short stories ===
- Some Women I Have Known, William Heinemann, London; D. Appleton & Company, New York, 1901
- My Poor Relations: Stories of Dutch Peasant Life, Constable & Co., London; D. Appleton & Company, New York, 1905
- The Woman's Victory, Constable & Co., London, 1906
- Brothers All: More Stories of Dutch Peasant Life, Methuen & Co., London, 1909
- Six Short Stories, Selected by Dr W. van Maanen, J.M. Meulenhoff, Amsterdam, [±1930]

=== Plays ===
- Julian: A Tragedy, Remington & Co, London, 1886
- Nivalis: A Tragedy in Five Acts, Kegan Paul, Trench, Trübner & Co., London, 1886

=== Letters ===
- The Letters of Maarten Maartens, Constable & Co., London, 1930

=== About Maarten Maartens ===
- Willem van Maanen, Maarten Maartens, Poet and Novelist, doctoral dissertation, Noordhoff, Groningen, 1928
- Sir Arthur Quiller-Couch, Preface to The Letters of Maarten Maartens, Constable & Co., London, 1930
- Norreys Jephson O’Conor, "A Memoir", in: The Letters of Maarten Maartens, Constable & Co., London, 1930
- Wim Zaal, Nooit van gehoord: Stiefkinderen van de Nederlandse beschaving, Ambo, Utrecht, 1969 and De Arbeiderspers, Amsterdam, 1974 (essays about Maarten Maartens a.o., in Dutch)
- Theo Daselaar, The Sad Successful Literary Life of Maarten Maartens, Master's thesis 1984
- Th.M. Gorissen, Maarten Maartens en het Maarten Maartenshuis, Stichting Maarten Maartens, Doorn, 1992 (in Dutch)
- Hendrik Breuls, A Comparative Evaluation of Selected Prose by Maarten Maartens, doctoral dissertation Technische Universität Dresden, 2005
