= Zaal =

Zaal may refer to:

== People ==
- Zaal (Persian mythology) or Zāl, legendary Iranian king

Given name

- Zaal, son of Alexander I of Georgia (c.1428 – after 1442), Georgian royal prince
- Zaal, Duke of Aragvi (died 1660), Georgian lord
- Zaali Eliava (born 1985), Georgian football player
- Zaal Samadashvili (born 1953), Georgian writer
- Zaal Udumashvili (born 1971), Georgian journalist and politician

Middle name

- Ahmed Saif Zaal Abu Muhair, Emirati paralympic athlete

Surname

- Mohammed Bin Zaal, U.A.E. business executive
- Wim Zaal (born 1935), Dutch journalist and translator

== Others ==
- IIS Zaal, original name of the Iranian frigate Alborz

== See also ==
- Zaalishvili
