= Carel Peeters =

Dutch literary critic, writer, and editor

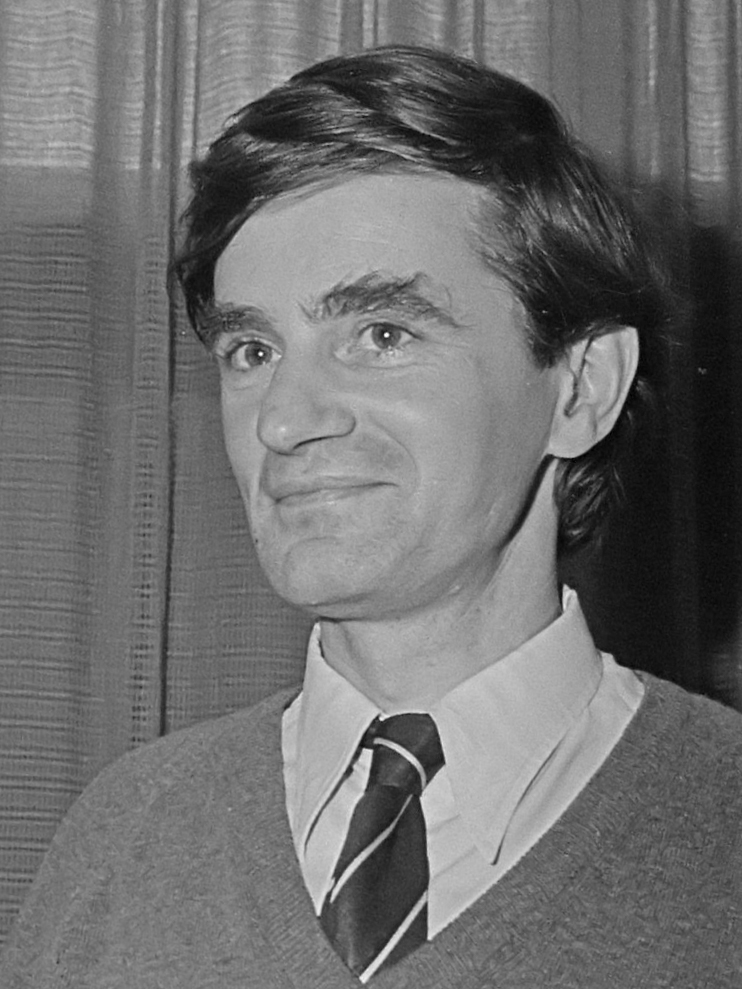
Carel Peeters (1981)

Carel Peeters (born 5 June 1944 in Nijmegen) is one of the leading Dutch literary critics and since 1973 a writer and editor at Vrij Nederland.

Peeters grew up in Nijmegen but moved, with his parents, to Amsterdam at age 14. In 1964 he enrolled at the University of Amsterdam to study literature, and began writing for the newspaper Het Parool; he never attained his degree. In 1970 he was hired by Elsevier, where he worked as the assistant of Wim Zaal, and in 1973 moved to Vrij Nederland (where he still works) and started their literary supplement, which in 1982 earned him an award from the Collectieve Propaganda van het Nederlandse Boek, the Dutch trade organization for booksellers and publishers. From 1987 to 1992 he was a professor of literature at the University of Amsterdam. Peeters published more than a dozen collections of essays, and was awarded the Dr. Wijnaendts Francken award for essays and literary criticism in 1985, and in 2008 the Jacobson Award, awarded to "elderly" literati.

As a literary critic, Peeters, whose allegiance is with the writers and critics associated with Forum from the 1930s and the De Revisor from the 1980s, is well known as an opponent of postmodernism; he published a pamphlet on the subject in 1986 and the following year participated in a well-publicized public debate with Christel van Boheemen.
