= Joustra =

Joustra is a Dutch surname. Notable people with the surname include:

- Arendo Joustra (b. 1957), Dutch writer and journalist
- Jan Joustra, Australian dean
- Marten Joustra, British composer
- Tjibbe Joustra (b. 1951), Dutch civil servant
- Joustra Tarigan
