= PBE =

PBE may refer to:

- Bayesian game § Perfect Bayesian Equilibrium
- Population balance equation
- Potential buoyant energy or convective available potential energy (CAPE)
- President Biden Expressway, a short freeway in Scranton, Pennsylvania
- Programming by example, in computing
- Password-based encryption
- Protective Breathing Equipment, smoke hoods on aircraft
- Phi Beta Epsilon, an MIT fraternity
- Prosopography of the Byzantine Empire
