= Doorn =

- Town
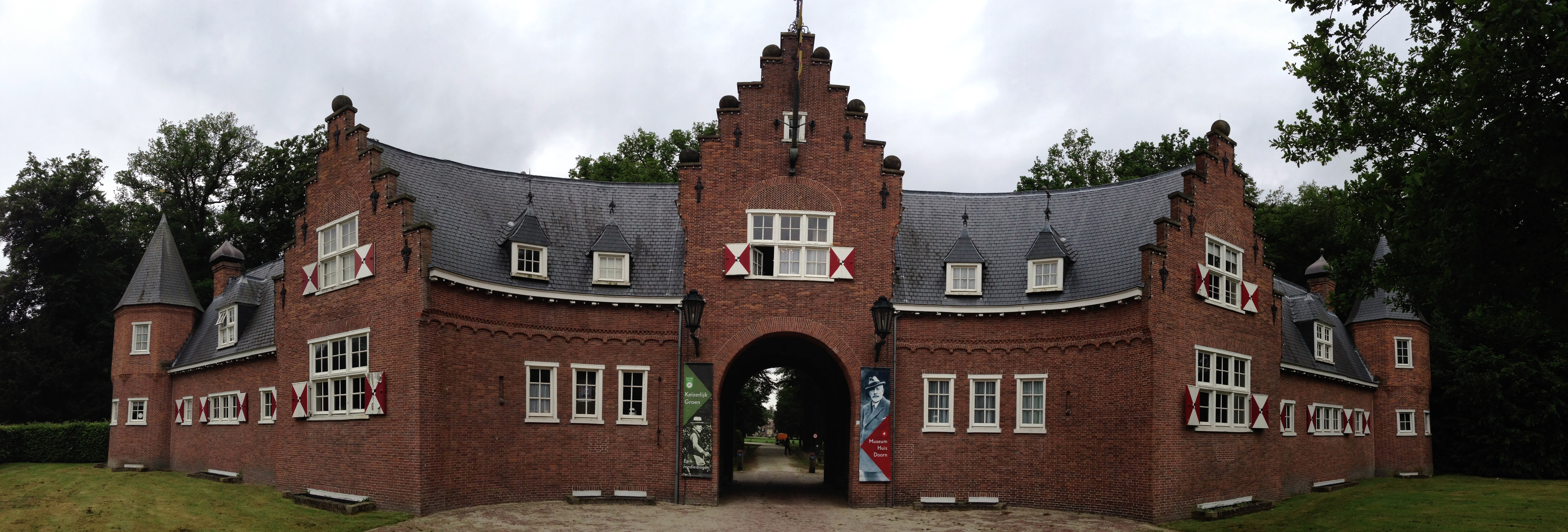
- Gate house to Huis Doorn

- Flag Coat of arms

- Location in the Netherlands Doorn (Netherlands)
- Coordinates: 52°02′N 5°21′E
- Country: Netherlands
- Province: Utrecht
- Municipality: Utrechtse Heuvelrug

Area
  - Total: 22.27 km^{2} (8.60 sq mi)
- Elevation: 5 m (16 ft)

Population (2021)
  - Total: 10,260
  - Density: 460.7/km^{2} (1,193/sq mi)
- Time zone: UTC+1 (CET)
  - Summer (DST): UTC+2 (CEST)
- Postal code: 3941
- Dialing code: 0343

Doorn is a town in the municipality of Utrechtse Heuvelrug in the central Netherlands, in the province of Utrecht. The town is famous for being the final residence of Wilhelm II.

== History ==
In a document from 885 to 896 the settlement is called "Thorhem", a dwelling of Thor, the god of thunder. Vikings quartered at Dorestad (now Wijk bij Duurstede) reportedly referred to the place as Thorhem, as the god of thunder was worshipped there. Archaeological excavations on a moor at the estate of Hoog Moersbergen, north of Doorn, have revealed evidence of a pagan sacrificial site.

Later, the settlement of Thorhem became part of the homestead known as Villa Thorhem. Around 1200, this homestead was in the possession of a provost of the Bishopric of Utrecht. One of his successors built a castle in the 14th century – now known as Huis Doorn – and established the Maartenskerk ("St. Martin's Church") around 1200. The church was extended in the 15th century and later passed into Protestant hands around 1585, remaining in use as a Protestant church. Another castle, Kasteel Moersbergen, was first mentioned in 1435 and has undergone several alterations since the 17th century. The expansive estate around Huis Doorn left little room for town expansion until 1874, when the estate was parcelled out. After World War II, the town experienced significant growth and today it also hosts a major base for the Royal Dutch Marines. Nearby is the Von Gimborn Arboretum, one of the botanical garden sites of Utrecht University. Doorn was an independent municipality until 1 January 2006, after which it became the principal town in the municipality of Utrechtse Heuvelrug. The town also supports its own football club, DEV Doorn.

== Notable inhabitants ==
The last German Emperor, Wilhelm II of Germany, lived at Huis Doorn in the center of the village after his deposition in 1918. Although he initially regarded his exile as humiliating, he gradually found solace in Doorn’s tranquility and personally oversaw the gardens, remaining active in following political developments until his death in 1941.

Dutch novelist Simon Vestdijk resided in Doorn for much of his life (1939–1971, with brief intervals elsewhere). His works reflect the peaceful yet introspective atmosphere of the village.

Dutch writer Maarten Maartens had a small castle built in Doorn—Zonheuvel ("Sun Hill," completed in 1903). Today, the castle is known as Maarten Maartenshuis and forms part of the hotel and conference center Zonheuvel.

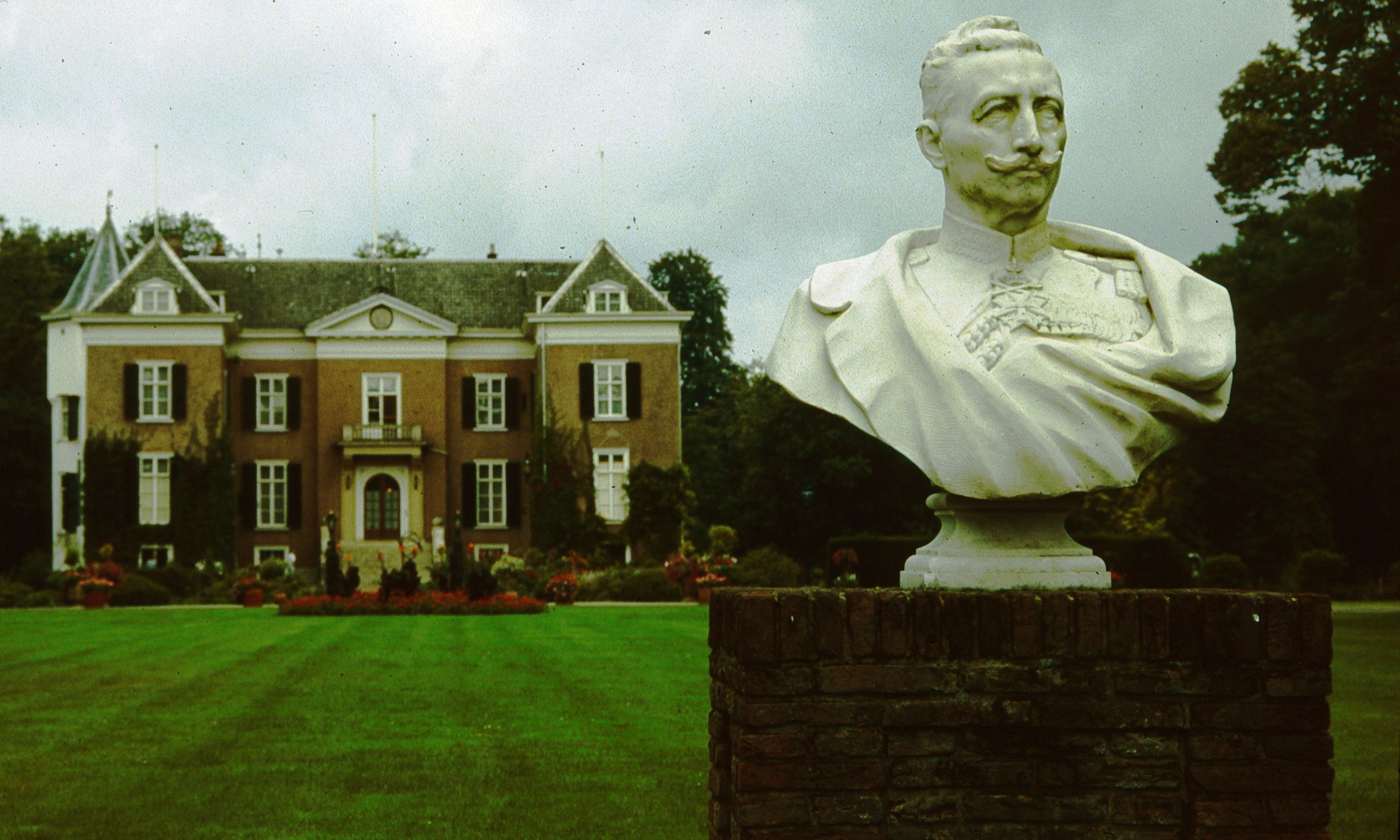
Kaiser Wilhelm II lived here for more than twenty years.

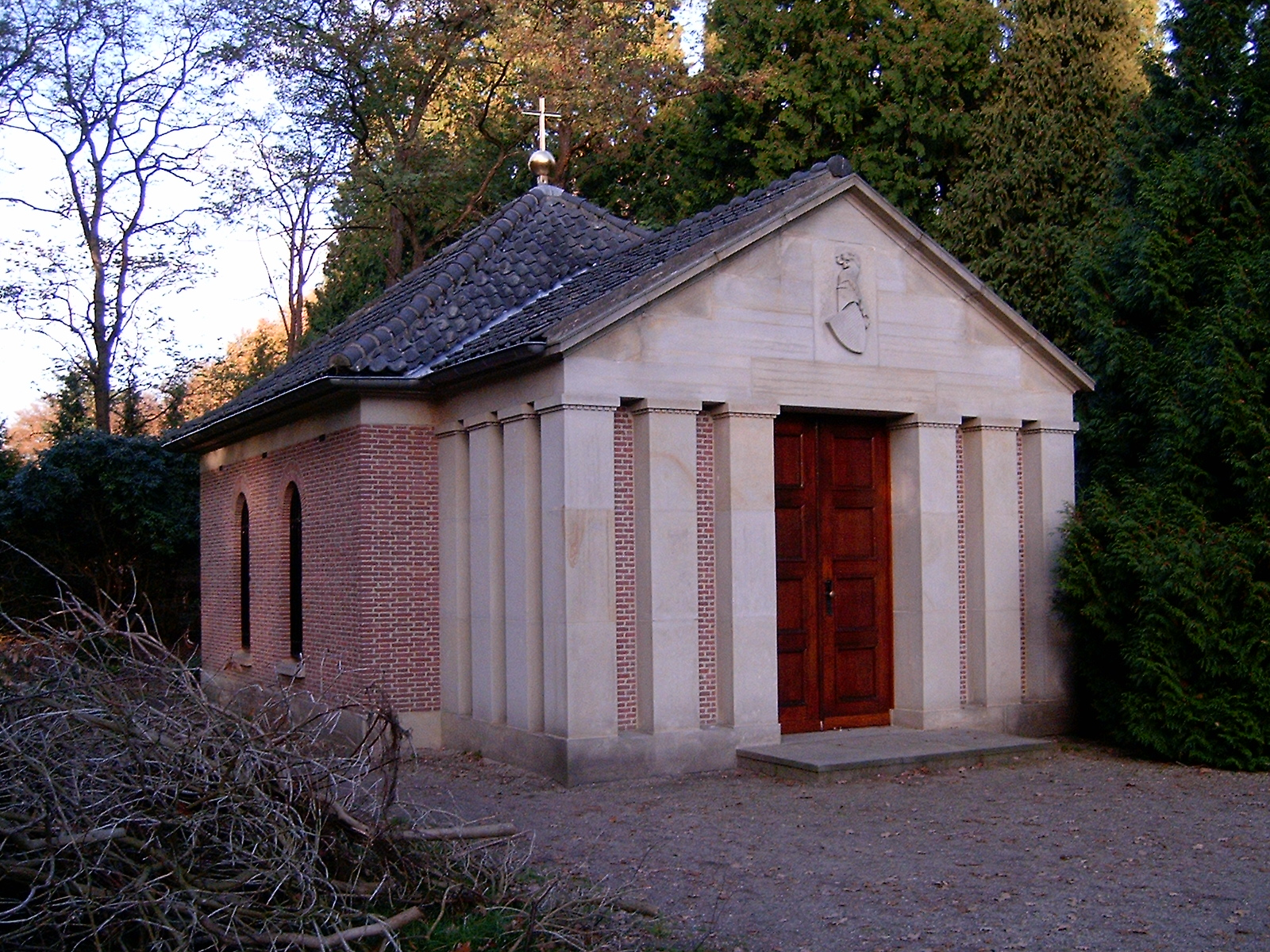
The tomb of Wilhelm II at Huis Doorn

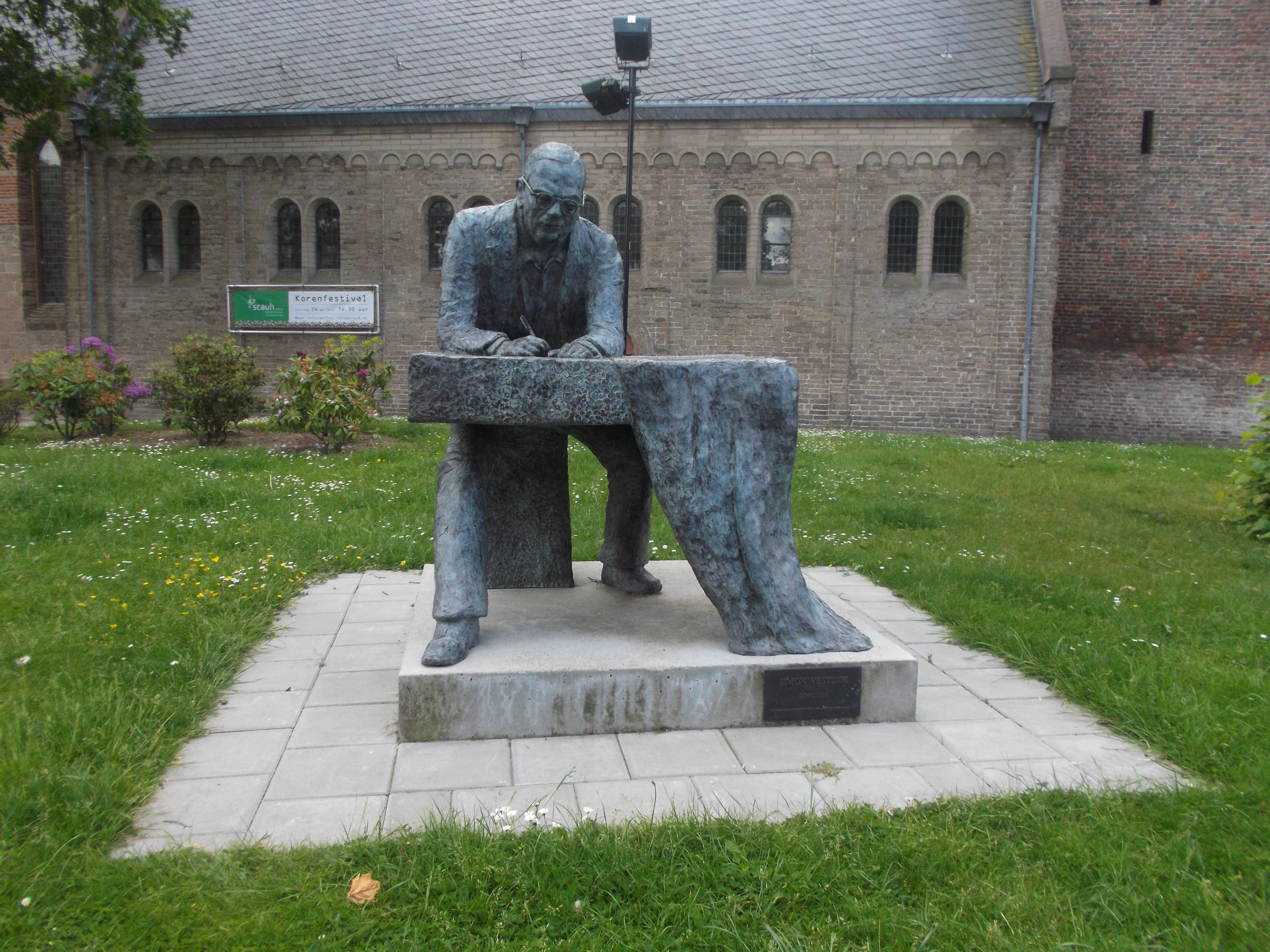
The statue of Simon Vestdijk in Doorn

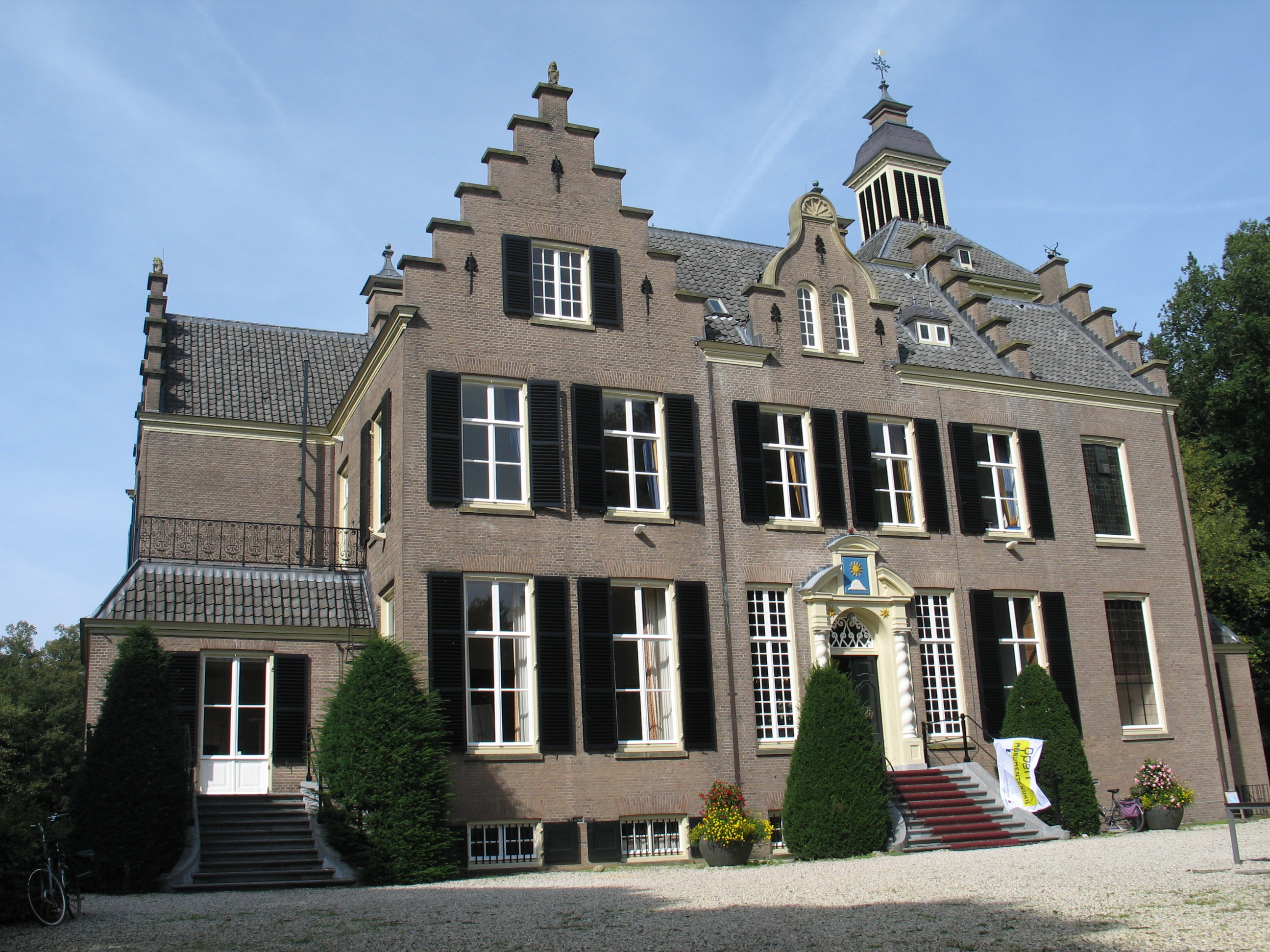
Maarten Maartens' house in Doorn
