= Seaweed cultivator =

A seaweed cultivator is a device used to grow and harvest seaweed biomass, usually in weekly or bi-weekly cycles. It remains distinct from manual seaweed cultivation using large nets in open waters, mainly in Asia.

The devices are slowly becoming available to the public, mainly because the implementation of LED has made waterproof illumination low-cost and reliable.

Currently, chlorophyta are the most practical species for cultivation using this device due to their high tolerance to temperature, salinity, and light intensity. Species such as sea lettuce can be grown at room temperature, whereas others such as nori require more complex control of the water temperature and other variables, making them harder to cultivate at scale.

== Background ==
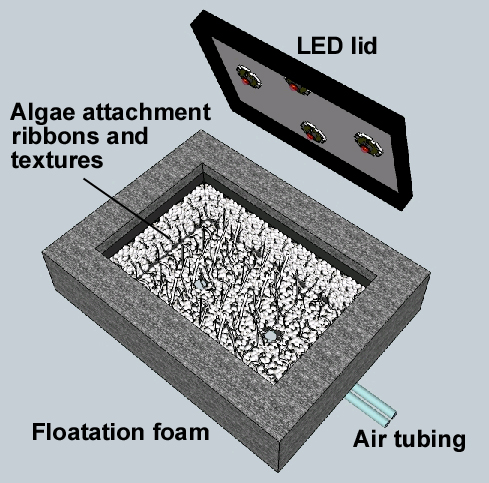
Layout of an algae scrubber

Seaweed cultivators have been developing in recent years in response to demands for seaweed in food, medicine, and biofuels. They emerged as an adaptation of the algae scrubber, invented in the 1970s by Smithsonian scientist Dr. Walter Adey. The algae scrubber was initially designed to remove harmful, excess nutrients from aquariums, and use them to stimulate biomass growth.

The seaweed cultivator adapts this technology to maximize biomass production. By replacing an aquarium with a reservoir of fertilized seawater, a stand-alone cultivator becomes a sound mechanism for seaweed production.

== Applications ==
In addition to a growing demand for traditional uses of seaweed across disciplines, seaweed aquaculture has been proposed as a mechanism for long-term carbon sequestration.

Through a rapid photosynthetic process, seaweed can convert anthropogenic carbon into biomass. In addition to the biomass that sinks naturally into seabeds, intentional sinking of farmed seaweed below 2,000 meters serves as a longer-lasting method of sequestration.

Scaling carbon dioxide removal is an urgent next step to limit global warming to 1.5º C, a key goal set by the 2015 Paris Agreement. There is a necessity for reaching net-zero emissions, which is impossible without extracting existing CO2 from the atmosphere.

While this work began in Asia, interest has spread to Europe, where the EU has a goal of producing eight million tons of seaweed by 2030. Seaweed has been widely recognized as a mechanism to help the EU meet climate targets, but sources agree that it must work in tandem with existing industries to scale profitably and effectively.

== See also ==
- Algaculture
- Algae bioreactor
- Algae scrubber
- Carbon sequestration
- Seaweed farming
