= G.B.J. Hiltermann =

G.B.J. Hiltermann

Gustavo Bernardo José Hiltermann (born 1 May 1914 in Buenos Aires, died 15 July 2000 in Amsterdam) was a Dutch journalist, jurist, political commentator, publisher and, since receiving his Ph.D. in 1972 with a dissertation on 'Eastern Europe and the German partition', also a historian.

== Given names ==
Hiltermann was born from Dutch parents in Argentina. As told by himself his parents wanted to name him Gustaaf Bernard Jozef but Argentinian law only allowed Spanish given names. Hiltermann never accepted it when people referred to him by his full name and he was often called Geebeejee, after the abbreviation of his given names.

== Career ==
He worked for some time for De Telegraaf. In 1942 he resigned from the newspaper because the Germans forced him to publish an antisemitic article. Afterwards he became one of the founders of Elsevier. Between 1952 and 1965 he was owner and director of the Haagse Post of which his wife Sylvia Brandts Buys was the editor. Later he was the head editor of the sixth edition of the Winkler Prins Encyclopedie.

== "De toestand in de wereld" ==
He became nationally famous with his weekly commentaries on international politics in the AVRO radio show item De toestand in de wereld, door mr. G.B.J. Hiltermann (English: The state of the world by mr. G.B.J. Hiltermann) which was aired from October 1956 till 22 November 1999, which were noted for his pro-western viewpoints.
