= God's Fool =

Novel by Maarten Maartens

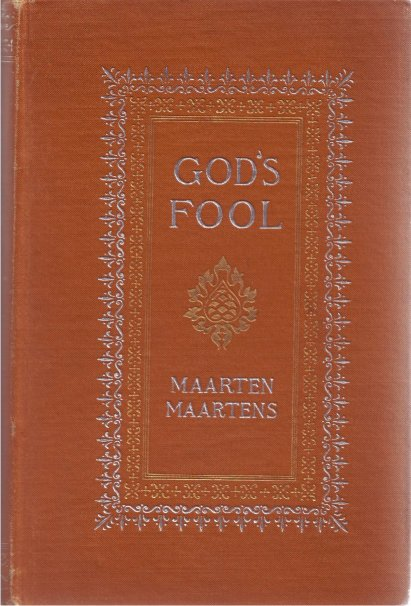
- Cover of the American edition of God's Fool, published by D. Appleton & Company, New York
- Author: Maarten Maartens
- Language: English
- Genre: Psychological novel
- Publisher: Richard Bentley & Son (UK); D. Appleton & Company (US)
- Publication date: 1892
- Publication place: Netherlands
- Media type: Print (hardback)
- Preceded by: A Question of Taste (1891)
- Followed by: The Greater Glory (1894)

God's Fool: A Koopstad Story is an English-language novel by the Dutch writer Maarten Maartens, first published in 1892. The title is based on 1 Corinthians 3:19: "For the wisdom of this world is foolishness with God." Elias Lossell, the principal character, may be a fool, but he has God's wisdom.

== Publication ==
The novel was first published in serial form in the literary periodical Temple Bar in 1892. The novel appeared as a book in the same year, simultaneously with Richard Bentley & Son in London in three volumes and D. Appleton & Company in New York in one volume. The book was reprinted several times; the last printing was in 1927, by Appleton. There are also editions by Macmillan (from 1902 onwards), Tauchnitz (in the Collection of British and American Authors) and Constable & Co. (as a volume of the Collected Works, 1914).

The book was translated into German as Gottes Narr in 1895 and into Dutch as God's gunsteling in 1896 and as De dwaas Gods in 1975. The German translation has been reprinted several times, for the last time in 1924. The Dutch translations did not meet with any success.

To honour the hundredth anniversary of Maartens' death De dwaas Gods was reprinted in 2015.

== Plot summary ==
The novel is set in the fictitious Dutch town of Koopstad. The novel's ‘hero’, Elias Lossell, becomes deaf and blind from an accident when he is nine years old. The people around him can communicate with him by writing letters with a finger on the palm of his hand. Although communication is possible, mentally he always remains a boy of nine.

Thanks to a somewhat thoughtless testament Elias becomes the rightful owner of the firm of Volderdoes Zonen, tea-merchants. His half-brothers, the twins Hendrik and Hubert, manage the firm on his behalf. Elias lives in a house of his own at the outskirts of Koopstad, looked after by his old nurse, Johanna, and occupies himself by growing flowers and helping the needy.

Hendrik tries to save up as much money as he can to buy out Elias and take over the firm. His spendthrift wife Cornelia does not make it easy for him. While Hubert stays in China to look after the firm's interests there, Hendrik starts speculating with Elias's money at the instigation of his brother-in-law, Thomas Alers. Hubert returns to Koopstad and gradually learns what his brother has done. He firmly disapproves.

This leads to a quarrel between the twins in Elias's house that escalates into murder: Hubert kills Hendrik. Elias understands what happened. In the last chapter he decides to take the blame of the murder on himself, giving the novel an open ending.

== Critical reception ==
God’s Fool was Maartens's best known novel and it was favourably received by most critics. One German critic, E. Kühnemann, even compared it to Dostoyevsky's The Idiot. This was exceptional though; more often Maartens was compared with Thackeray. Breuls's chapter III.2: ‘The principles of method’ focuses on the differences and similarities between the two writers. Many critics, like, for instance, another German, Leon Keller, praised its ‘Dutch characteristic atmosphere’. Marion Spielmann said the characters of Thomas Alers and the Lossells in God’s Fool ‘live for us in his pages with a vividness that makes it hard to believe that they have no counterparts except as types.’ In 1924 the book was still so well known that Dru Drury, president of the South African Medical Association, mentioned it in his address at the 19th South African Medical Congress: ‘You may hear an articulate infant mind speaking in (…) Elias Lossell.’

The book has been criticized too, especially the beginning and the end. The first two chapters are flashforwards. Gertrude Buck and Elisabeth Woodbridge Morris in their book A Course in Narrative Writing found fault with them and called this way of telling a story ‘gallery-play’. Edmund Gosse told Maartens in a letter dated 6 December 1892 that he did not like ‘the end of vol. III, which you must really forgive me for sternly disapproving of. I don’t think this melodramatic burst of fratricide worthy of you – I don’t indeed.’ Van Maanen too called the end ‘not wholly satisfactory’, but: ‘we cannot but praise [the book] for its skilfully-spun intrigue, its clever psychological analysis and its keen satire.’

== About the book ==
- Willem van Maanen, Maarten Maartens, Poet and Novelist, doctoral dissertation, Noordhoff, Groningen, 1928, Chapter III.5: ‘God’s Fool’ (pp. 59–65).
- Hendrik Breuls, A Comparative Evaluation of Selected Prose by Maarten Maartens, doctoral dissertation Technische Universität Dresden, 2005, Chapter II.5: ‘Christian ideals crushed: God’s Fool (1892)’ (pp. 67–71).
