= Algae bioreactor =

Device used for cultivating micro or macro algae

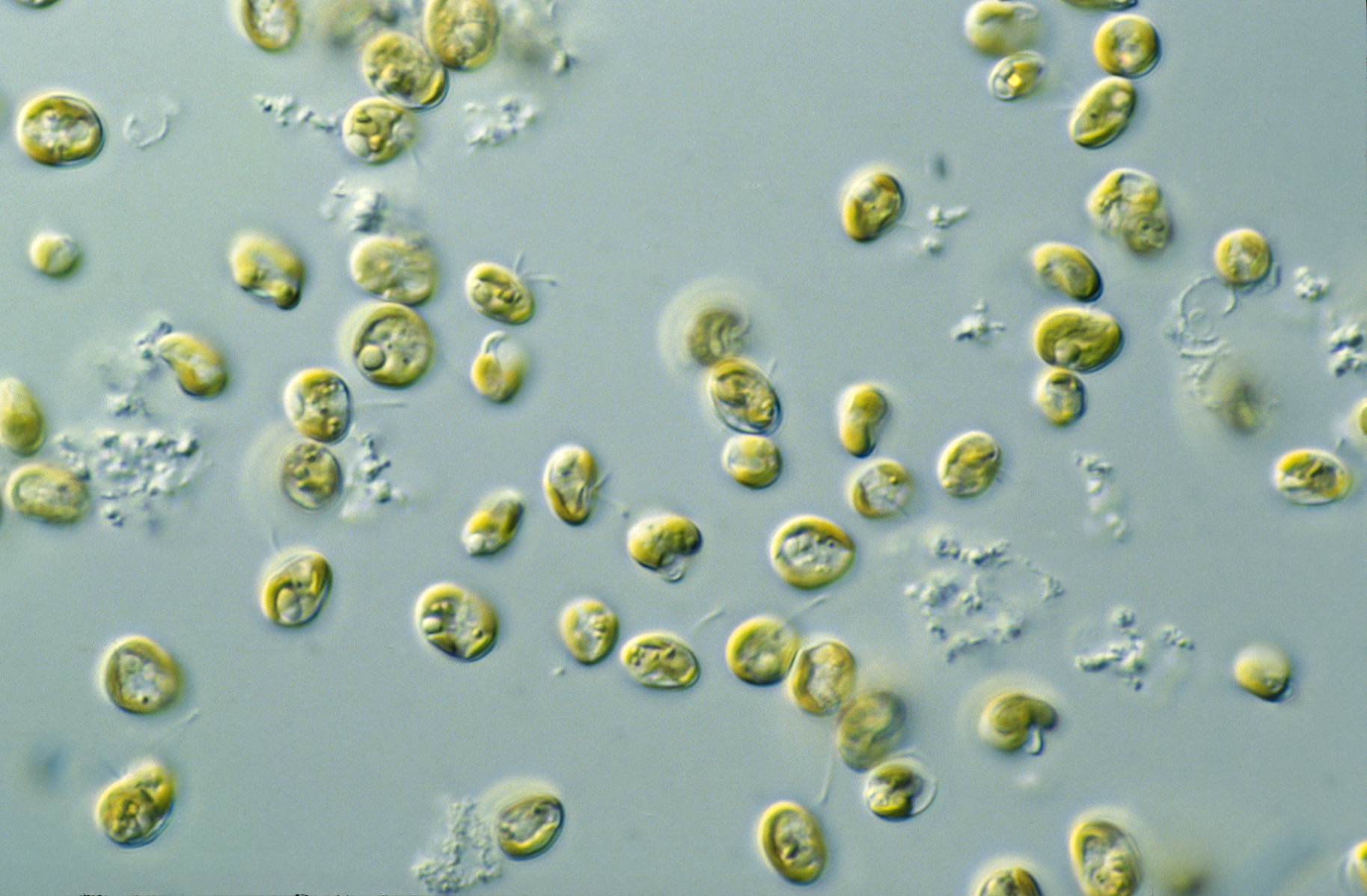
A close up of microalgae – Pavlova sp.

An algae bioreactor is used for cultivating micro or macroalgae. Algae may be cultivated for the purposes of biomass production (as in a seaweed cultivator), wastewater treatment, CO_{2} fixation, or aquarium/pond filtration in the form of an algae scrubber. Algae bioreactors vary widely in design, falling broadly into two categories: open reactors and enclosed reactors. Open reactors are exposed to the atmosphere while enclosed reactors, also commonly called photobioreactors, are isolated to varying extents from the atmosphere. Specifically, algae bioreactors can be used to produce fuels such as biodiesel and bioethanol, to generate animal feed, or to reduce pollutants such as NO_{x} and CO_{2} in flue gases of power plants. Fundamentally, this kind of bioreactor is based on the photosynthetic reaction, which is performed by the chlorophyll-containing algae itself using dissolved carbon dioxide and sunlight. The carbon dioxide is dispersed into the reactor fluid to make it accessible to the algae. The bioreactor has to be made out of transparent material.

== Historical background ==
The first microalgae cultivation was of the unicellular Chlorella vulgaris by Dutch microbiologist Martinus Beijerinck in 1890. Later, during World War II, Germany used open ponds to increase algal cultivation for use as a protein supplement. Some of the first experiments with the aim of cultivating algae were conducted in 1957 by the Carnegie Institution for Science in Washington. In these experiments, monocellular Chlorella were cultivated by adding CO_{2} and some minerals. The goal of this research was the cultivation of algae to produce a cheap animal feed.

== Metabolism of microalgae ==
Algae are primarily eukaryotic photoautotrophic organisms which perform oxygenic photosynthesis. These types of algae are classified by their light-harvesting pigments which give them their color. The green algae species, also known as Chlorophyta, are often used in bioreactors due to their high growth rate and ability to withstand a variety of environments. Blue-green algae, also known as cyanobacteria, are classified as prokaryotic photoautotrophs due to their lack of a nucleus. Light provides essential energy the cell needs to metabolize CO_{2}, nitrogen, phosphorus and other essential nutrients. The wavelengths and intensities of light are very important factors. Available CO_{2} is also an important factor for growth and due to the lower concentration in our atmosphere, supplementary CO_{2} can be added as seen with the bubble column PBR below. Microalgae also possess the ability to take up excess nitrogen and phosphorus under starvation conditions, which are essential for lipid and amino acid synthesis. Higher temperatures and a pH above 7 and below 9 are also common factors. Each of these factors may vary from species to species so it is important to have the correct environmental conditions while designing bioreactors of any sort.

== Types of bioreactors ==
Bioreactors can be divided into two broad categories, open systems and photobioreactors (PBR). The difference between these two reactors are their exposure to the surrounding environment. Open systems are fully exposed to the atmosphere, while PBRs have very limited exposure to the atmosphere.

== Commonly used open systems ==
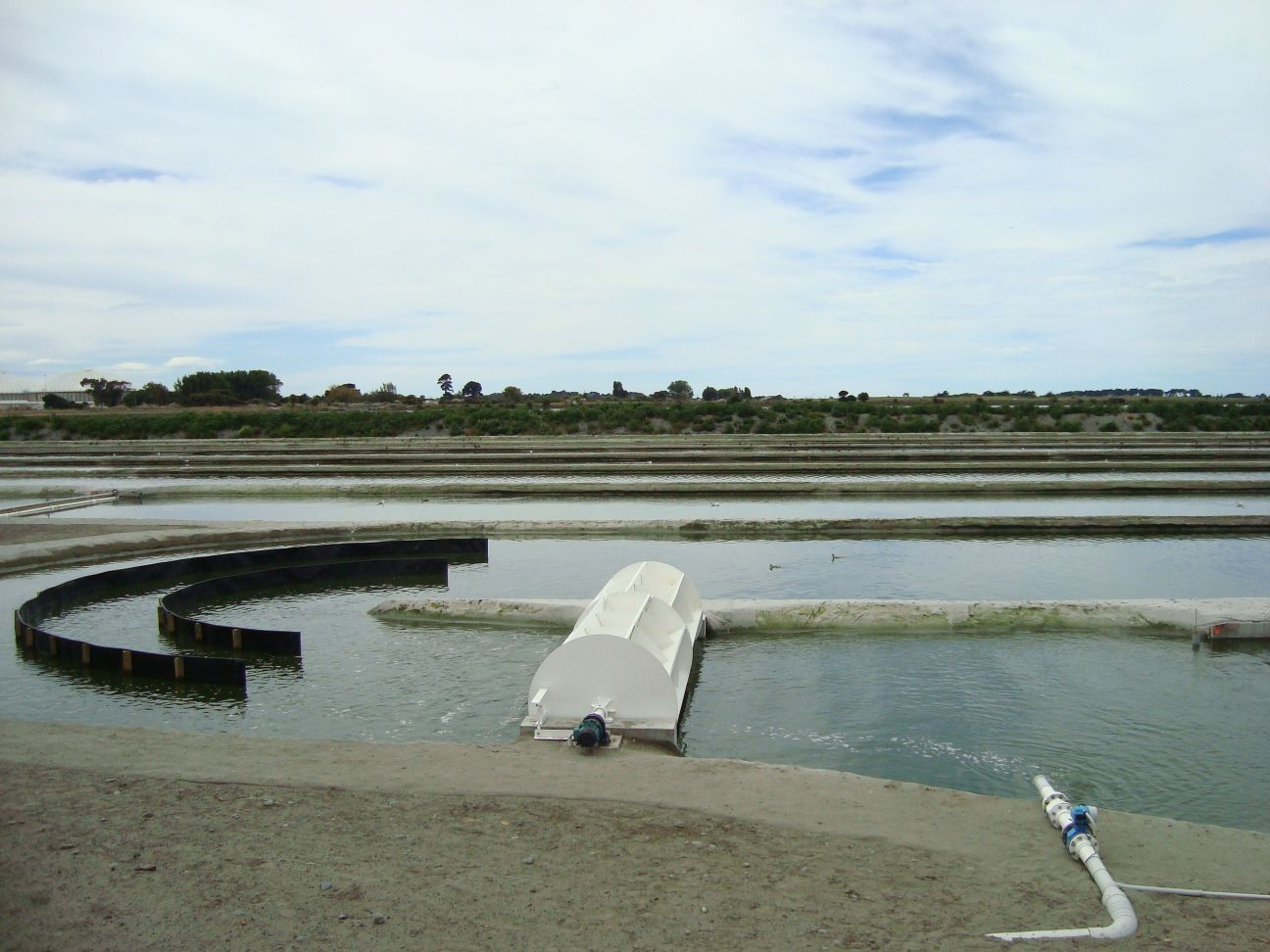
Raceway pond at the Bromley waste water treatment plant in Christchurch, New Zealand used for algae cultivation.

=== Simple ponds ===
The simplest system yields a low production and operation cost. Ponds need a rotating mixer to avoid settling of algal biomass. However, these systems are prone to contamination due to the lack of environmental control.

=== Raceway ponds ===
A modified version of a simple pond, the raceway pond uses paddle wheel to drive the flow in a certain direction. The pond is continuously collecting biomass while providing carbon dioxide and other nutrients back into the pond. Typically, raceway ponds are very large due to their low water depth.

=== Other systems ===
Less common systems include an incline cascade system where flow is gravity-driven to a retention tank, from where it gets pumped back up to start again. This system can yield high biomass densities, but also entails higher operating costs.

== Commonly used photobioreactors (PBRs) ==
Nowadays, 3 basic types of algae photobioreactors have to be differentiated, but the determining factor is the unifying parameter – the available intensity of sunlight energy.

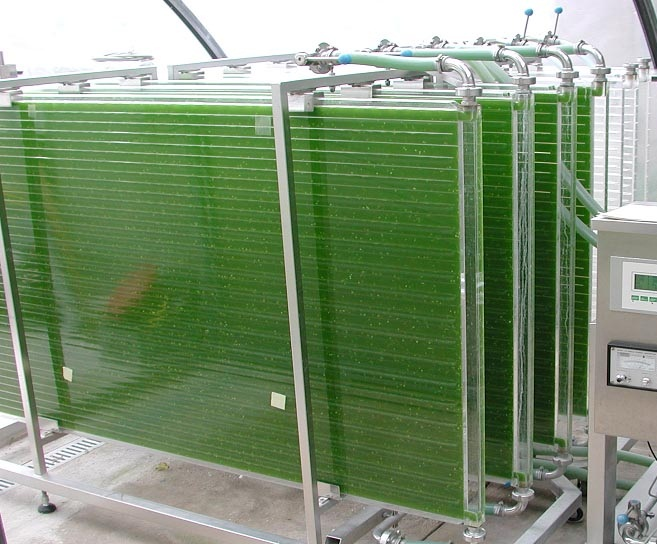
plastic plate photobioreactor for the cultivation of microalgae and other photosynthetic organisms. It has an operational volume of 500 liters.

=== Flat plate PBR ===
A plate reactor simply consists of inclined or vertically arranged translucent rectangular boxes, which are often divided in two parts to affect an agitation of the reactor fluid. Generally, these boxes are arranged into a system by linking them. Those connections are also used for making the process of filling/emptying, introduction of gas and transport of nutritive substances. The introduction of the flue gas mostly occurs at the bottom of the box to ensure that the carbon dioxide has enough time to interact with algae in the reactor fluid. Typically, these plates are illuminated from both sides and have a high light penetration. Disadvantages of the flat plate design are the limited pressure tolerance and high space requirements.

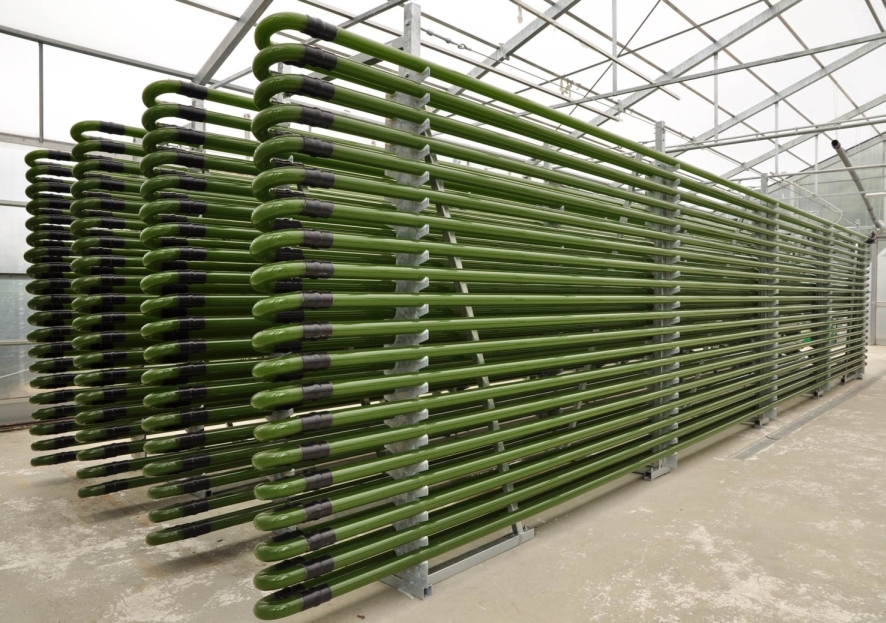
tubular glass photobioreactor for the cultivation of microalgae and other photosynthetic organisms. It has an operational volume of 4000 liters.

=== Tubular PBR ===
A tubular reactor consists of vertically or horizontally arranged tubes, connected together, in which the algae-suspended fluid circulates. The tubes are generally made out of transparent plastics or borosilicate glass, and the constant circulation is kept up by a pump at the end of the system. The introduction of gas takes place at the end/beginning of the tube system. This way of introducing gas causes the problem of carbon dioxide deficiency and high concentration of oxygen at the end of the unit during the circulation, ultimately making the process inefficient. The growth of microalgae on the walls of the tubes can inhibit the penetration of the light as well.

=== Bubble column PBR ===
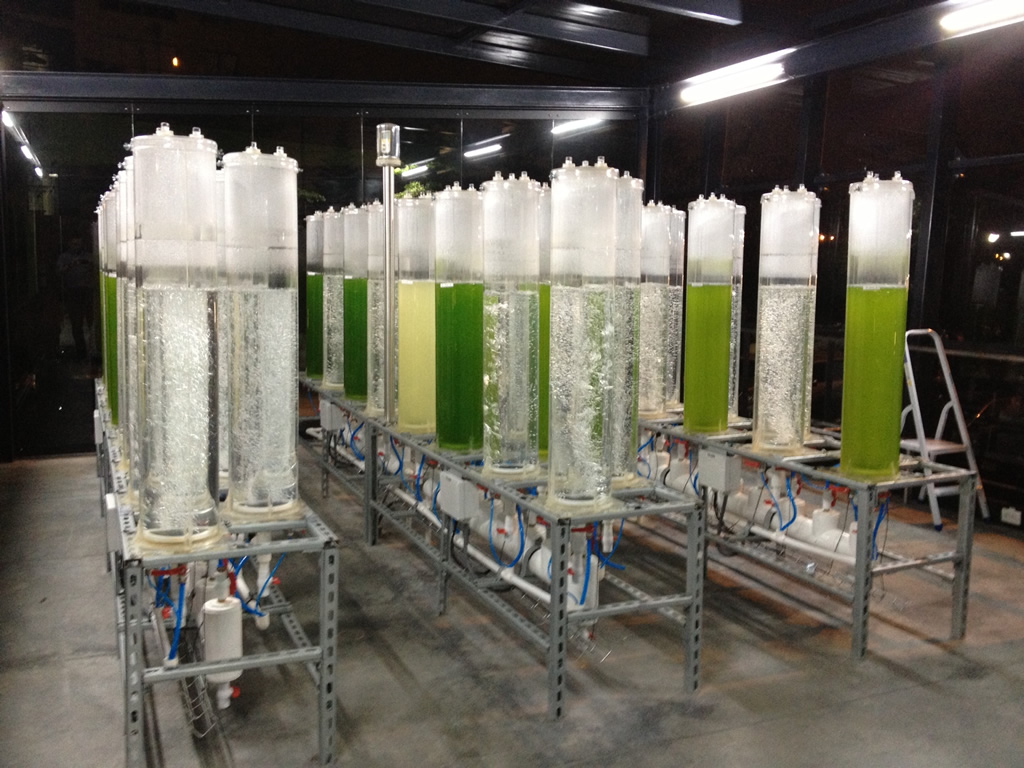
Vertical bubble columns, a project at the Universidad EAFIT to utilize algae to reduce CO_{2} emissions.

A bubble column photo reactor consists of vertically arranged cylindrical columns made out of transparent material. The introduction of gas takes place at the bottom of the column and causes a turbulent stream to enable an optimum gas exchange. The bubbling also acts as a natural agitator. Light is typically sourced from outside the column, however recent designs introduce lights inside the column to increase light distribution and penetration.

== Industrial usage ==
The cultivation of algae in a photobioreactor creates a narrow range of industrial application possibilities. There are three common pathways for cultivated biomass. Algae may be used for environmental improvements, biofuel production and food/biofeed. Some power companies already established research facilities with algae photobioreactors to find out how efficient they could be in reducing CO_{2} emissions, which are contained in flue gas, and how much biomass will be produced. Algae biomass has many uses and can be sold to generate additional income. The saved emission volume can bring an income too, by selling emission credits to other power companies. Recent studies around the world look at the algae usage for treating wastewater as a way to become more sustainable.

The utilization of algae as food is very common in East Asian regions and is making an appearance around the world for uses in feedstock and even pharmaceuticals due to their high value products. Most of the species contain only a fraction of usable proteins and carbohydrates, and a lot of minerals and trace elements. Generally, the consumption of algae should be minimal because of the high iodine content, particularly problematic for those with hyperthyroidism. Likewise, many species of diatomaceous algae produce compounds unsafe for humans. The algae, especially some species which contain over 50 percent oil and a lot of carbohydrates, can be used for producing biodiesel and bioethanol by extracting and refining the fractions. The algae biomass is generated 30 times faster than some agricultural biomass, which is commonly used for producing biodiesel.

== Microgeneration ==
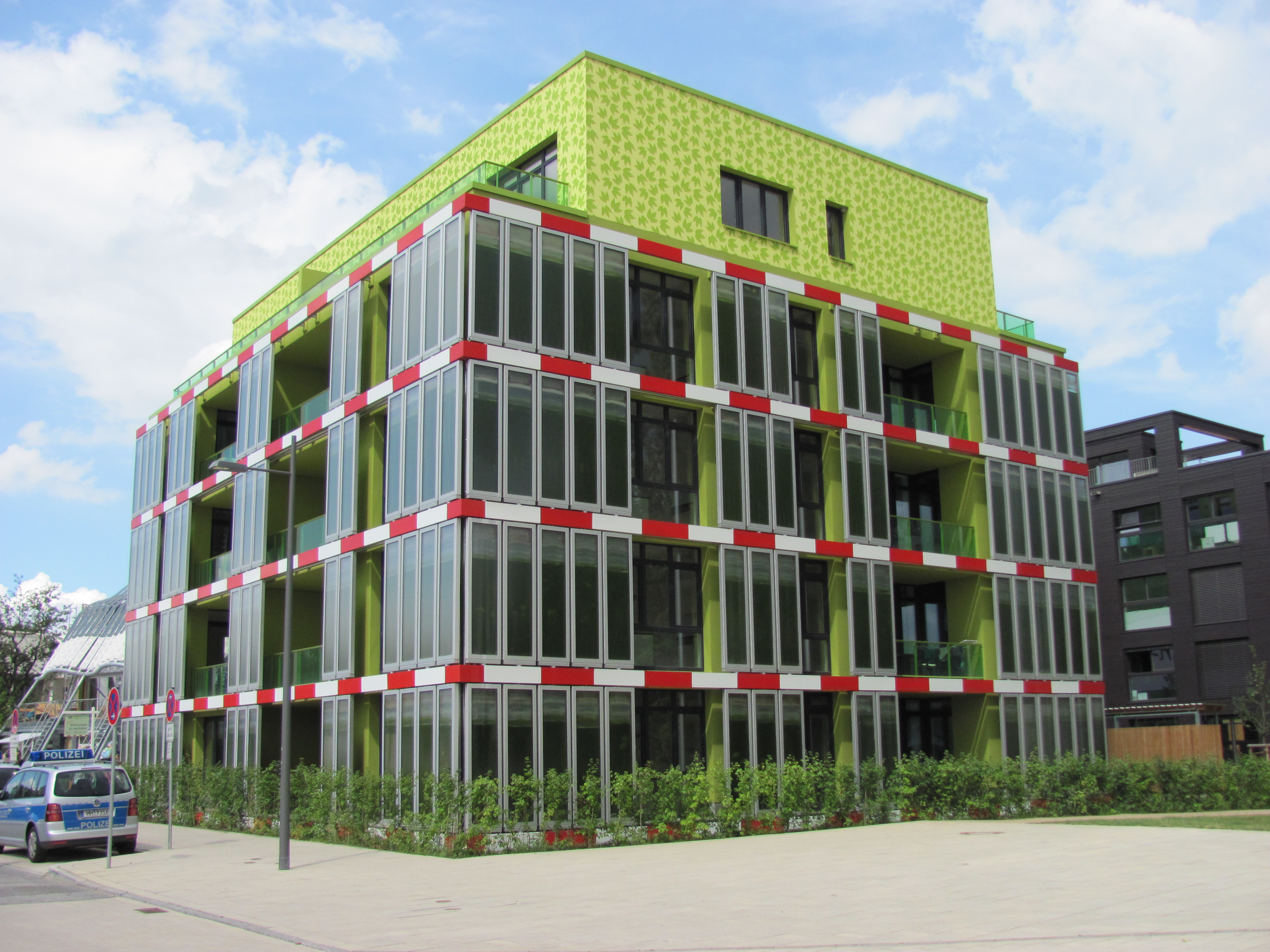
The Bio-Intelligent Quotient (BIQ) House in Hamburg

The BIQ House built in 2013 in Germany is a showcase experimental bionic house using glass facade panels for the cultivation of micro algae. Once the panels heat up thermal energy can also be extracted through a heat exchanger in order to supply warm water to the building. The technology is still in an early stage and not yet fit for a wider use.

The Green Power House in Montana, United States used newly developed Algae Aquaculture Technology within a system that uses sunlight and woody debris waste from a lumber mill for providing nutrients to eight algae ponds of the AACT that cover its floor. Identified challenges of algae façades include durability of microalgae panels, the need for maintenance, and construction and maintenance costs

In 2022, news outlets reported about the development of algae biopanels by a company for sustainable energy generation with unclear viability.

== See also ==
- Moss bioreactor
