= Jan Joustra =

Jan Joustra is an Australian Anglican priest. He is currently the rector of St Mary's South Perth in Western Australia. He was previously vicar of St Mary's, North Melbourne, and was the Dean of Waikato in New Zealand from 2007 until 2011.

Joustra was born in the Netherlands before emigrating to Australia. He was educated at the University of Tasmania. After working as a lecturer in textiles and design he was ordained in 1991. He served curacies in East Melbourne and Wangaratta. After this he was rector of Rutherglen-Chiltern. In 1997 he became priest in charge of St Stephen's Hong Kong, a post he held until his appointment as the Anglican chaplain in Monaco. In 2007 he was appointed as Dean of Waikato. From 2012 he was the vicar of St Andrew's Brighton.
