= Remington & Co =

British publisher

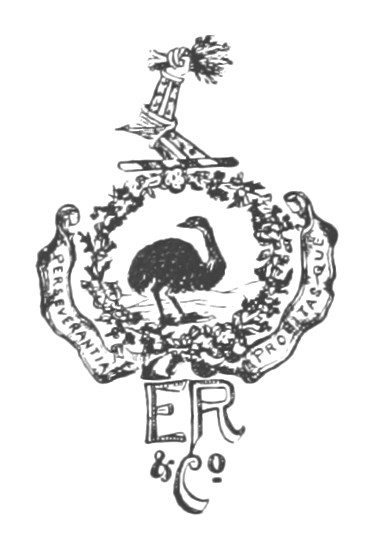
Signet (1893)

Remington & Co was a UK-based publishing company founded in the 19th century and characterised by a number of books published about life in Australia.

At one point the company was known as Eden, Remington & Co. It was headquartered at a number of London addresses including, 134, New Bond St., London & Henrietta Street, Covent Garden, London.
