= Wim Zaal =

Dutch journalist, essayist, translator and literary critic (1935–2021)

Willem Philippe Maria "Wim" Zaal (14 August 1935 – 11 October 2021) was a Dutch journalist, essayist, translator and literary critic. He was literary editor of Elsevier for years.

He has edited anthologies from the works of many authors, including Joost van den Vondel. He translated works by the Belgian writer Neel Doff from French into Dutch and also translated the memoirs of King Louis Bonaparte in 1983.

Zaal also wrote a few books about Italy, a country that has always fascinated him.

In 2001, Queen Beatrix of the Netherlands awarded him the Honorary Cross of the Order of the House of Orange. Zaal died on 11 October 2021, at the age of 86.

== Works ==
- Vloekjes bij de thee: Een reportage over de 19de eeuw in Nederland, J.M. Meulenhoff, Amsterdam, 1961. Re-issued in 1993 by Goossens, Rijswijk
- Zó ben ik nu eenmaal: Nederlanders schrijven over zichzelf in dagboeken, autobiografieën en brieven, Bonaventura, Amsterdam, 1962
- Aan de rol met Sisyfus: Divagatiën en consideratiën, Wereldbibliotheek, Amsterdam, 1964
- De Herstellers: Lotgevallen van de Nederlandse fascisten, Ambo, Utrecht, 1966
- Nooit van gehoord: Stiefkinderen van de Nederlandse beschaving, Ambo, Utrecht, 1969. Re-issued in 1974 by De Arbeiderspers, Amsterdam
- Geliefde Gedichten die iedereen kent maar niet kan vinden, De Arbeiderspers, Amsterdam, 1972
- Gods onkruid: Nederlandse sekten en messiassen, J.M. Meulenhoff, Amsterdam, 1972. Re-issued in 1985 by Kruseman, The Hague, and in 2004 by Aspekt, Soesterberg
- De Nederlandse fascisten, Wetenschappelijke Uitgeverij, Amsterdam, 1973
- Geheime Gedichten: Die Niemand Kent Maar Die Toch Gezien Mogen Worden, De Arbeiderspers, Amsterdam, 1974
- Zoek het koninkrijk: Heiligenlevens voor niet-gelovigen verteld, J.M. Meulenhoff, Amsterdam, 1976
- Rome: Gids om Rome lief te hebben, J.H. Gottmer, Haarlem, 1977.
- De heiligen: Erflaters van Europa, Ambo, Baarn, 1982
- Flip van der Burgt: 1927-1977, Stichting Vrienden van Flip van der Burgt, Amsterdam, 1984
- Voorlopige uitslag, De Oude Degel, Eemnes, 1985
- Rome, Terra, Zutphen, 1985
- Vlak bij Vlaanderen: Een Hollander over het zuiden, Manteau, Antwerpen/Amsterdam, 1986
- Verhalen van man tot man, Goossens, Tricht, 1987
- Een tik van Italië: Reisverhalen, Amber, Amsterdam, 1991. Re-issued in 2001 by Aspekt, Soesterberg
- De verlakkers, Amber, Amsterdam, 1991. Re-issued in 2009 as Valsheid in geschriften
- Roma magica: Mysteries en mirakelen van de eeuwige stad, Conserve, Schoorl, 1993
- Onnozele kinderen: Lodewijk XVII, Victor van Aveyron, Kaspar Hauser, De Arbeiderspers, Amsterdam, 1995
- De buitenbeentjes: 36 schrijvers die ik heb gekend, Aspekt, Nieuwegein, 1995
- De vuist van de paus: De Nederlandse zouaven in Italië, 1860-1870, Aspekt, Nieuwegein, 1996
- De eeuwige belofte van Eldorado, Aspekt, Nieuwegein, 1996
- Rust in Rome: Wandelen langs dodenakkers, grafkerken, catacomben, mausolea en andere plaatsen van eeuwige rust, Elmar, Rijswijk, 1999
- Bar en boos: De slechtste gedichten in de Nederlandse taal, Prometheus, Amsterdam, 2001
- Zestig jaar in de beschaving, Aspekt, Soesterberg, 2002
- Engelenzang en andere gedichten, De Beuk, Amsterdam, 2003
- Rome: een religieuze gids, Aspekt, Soesterberg, 2004
- Alle heiligen: Heiligenkalender voor Nederland en Vlaanderen, Elmar, Rijswijk, 2004
- Moord in het Vaticaan: De mooiste verhalen over Rome, Aspekt, Soesterberg, 2006
- Een leeuw is eigenlijk iemand: Nederlandstalige dierenpoëzie, J.M. Meulenhoff, Amsterdam, 2006
- God en Zoon: Wat iedereen moet weten over bijbel, christendom en kerkelijke feesten, Aspekt, Soesterberg, 2007
- Kaspar Hauser, Aspekt, Soesterberg, 2008
- De 100 leukste dierengedichten, J.M. Meulenhoff, Amsterdam, 2009
- Valsheid in geschriften: Literaire vervalsingen en mystificaties, Aspekt, Soesterberg, 2009 (re-issue of De verlakkers)
- Jan Toorop: Zijn leven, zijn werk, zijn tijd, Aspekt, Soesterberg, 2010

== Obituary ==
- Arendo Joustra: 'Levensbericht Willem Philippe Maria (Wim) Zaal'. In: Jaarboek van de Maatschappij der Nederlandse Letterkunde te Leiden 2021-2022, pag. 251-262 (in Dutch)
