= Mohammed Zaal =

U.A.E. business executive

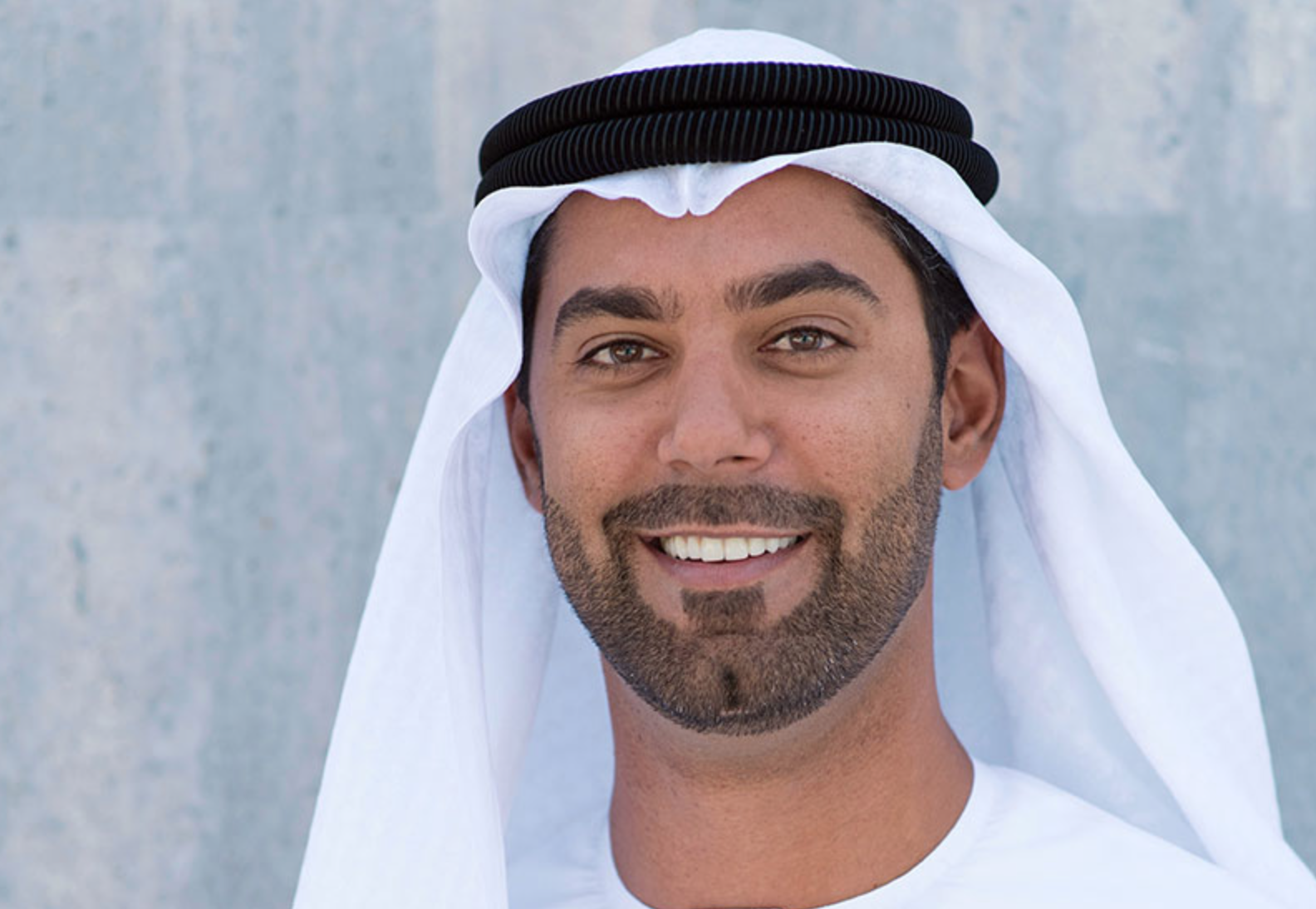
- Born: United Arab Emirates
- Occupation: Businessman
- Years active: 2005–present
- Notable work: CEO Al Barari

Mohammed Zaal (Arabic: محمد بن زعل) is an entrepreneur from the UAE who has created real estate developments and luxury villas in Dubai for sale. He is the former CEO of green villa community named Al Barari. Mohammed is founder and currently the CEO of real estate company KOA launched in September 2016.

Mohammed Zaal is listed by Arabian Business in the "100 most powerful Arabs under 40", and by Scoop Empire in "22 most powerful Emiratis under 40". He is consistently in Construction Week Online's "construction week power 100". He has won "Businessman of the year" Award by the magazine Esquire (Middle East). He serves as an Advisory Board Member to the Dubai Chamber of Commerce and Industry

== Career ==
Mohammed Bin Zaal is a graduate of the Royal Military College of Science at Cranfield University. In 2005, he joined Al Barari as a sales executive following the Zaal clan's green estate business. He was later appointed as CEO of the company.

In early 2015, Mohammed announced a new luxury residential villa project called The Nest which was later shaped into KOA project. He is currently the founder and chief executive officer of KOA.

== Awards ==
During 2018, Mohammed was named Businessman of the Year by esquire for his work with sustainable designs.
