= Hatta number =

Dimensionless number in chemistry

The Hatta number (Ha) was developed by Shirôji Hatta (1895-1973) in 1932, who taught at Tohoku University from 1925 to 1958. It is a dimensionless parameter that compares the rate of reaction in a liquid film to the rate of diffusion through the film. It is related to one of the many Damköhler numbers, Hatta being the square root of such a Damköhler number of the second type. Conceptually the Hatta number bears strong resemblance to the Thiele modulus for diffusion limitations in porous catalysts, which also is the square root of a Damköhler number. For a second order reaction (r_{A} = k_{2}C_{B}C_{A}) Hatta is defined via:

$Ha^2 = {{k_{2} C_{A,i} C_{B,bulk} \delta_L} \over {\frac{D_A}{\delta_L}\ C_{A,i}}} = {{k_2 C_{B,bulk} D_A} \over ({\frac{D_A}{\delta_L}}) ^2} = {{k_2 C_{B,bulk} D_A} \over {{k_L} ^2}}$

For a reaction m^{th} order in A and n^{th} order in B:

$Ha = {{ \sqrt{{\frac{2}{{m} + 1}}k_{m,n} {C_{A,i}}^{m - 1} C_{B,bulk}^n {D}_A}} \over {{k}_L}}$

For gas-liquid absorption with chemical reactions, a high Hatta number indicates the reaction is much faster than diffusion, usually referred to as the "fast reaction" or "chemically enhanced" regime. In this case, the reaction occurs within a thin (hypothetical) film, and the surface area and the Hatta number itself limit the overall rate.

For Ha>2, with a large excess of B, the maximum rate of reaction assumes that the liquid film is saturated with gas at the interfacial (C_{A,i}) and that the bulk concentration of A remains zero; the flux and hence the rate of reaction becomes proportional to the mass transfer coefficient k_{L} and the Hatta number: k_{L}C_{A,i}Ha.

Conversely, a Hatta number smaller than unity suggests the reaction is the limiting factor, and the reaction takes place in the bulk fluid; the concentration of A needs to be calculated taking the mass transfer limitation - without enhancement - into account.

== See also ==
- Dimensionless quantity
- Dimensional analysis
