= Trickle-bed reactor =

Chemical reactor

Scheme of a trickle-bed reactor

A trickle-bed reactor (TBR) is a chemical reactor that uses the downward movement of a liquid and the downward (co-current) or upward (counter-current) movement of gas over a packed bed of (catalyst) particles. It is considered to be the simplest reactor type for performing catalytic reactions where a gas and liquid (normally both reagents) are present in the reactor and accordingly it is extensively used in processing plants. Typical examples are liquid-phase hydrogenation, hydrodesulfurization, and hydrodenitrogenation in refineries (three phase hydrotreater) and oxidation of harmful chemical compounds in wastewater streams or of cumene in the cumene process.
Also in the treatment of waste water trickle bed reactors are used where the required biomass resides on the packed bed surface.

== Kinetics ==
Although the physical reactor is relatively simple, the hydrodynamics in the reactor are extremely complex. It is for this reason that TBRs have been extensively studied over the past five decades and currently the amount of open literature publications on TBRs is increasing, hinting that the understanding of the hydrodynamics is still limited.

A good introduction to the hydrodynamics of TBR can be found in the classic article by Satterfield. Rate of reaction and mass transfer equations are derived by Fogler.

== See also ==
- Trickling filter
