= Population balance equation =

Population balance equations (PBEs) have been introduced in several branches of modern science, mainly in Chemical Engineering, to describe the evolution of a population of particles. This includes topics like crystallization, leaching (metallurgy), liquid–liquid extraction, gas-liquid dispersions like water electrolysis, liquid-liquid reactions, comminution, aerosol engineering, biology (where the separate entities are cells based on their size or intracellular proteins), polymerization, etc. Population balance equations can be said to be derived as an extension of the Smoluchowski coagulation equation which describes only the coalescence of particles. PBEs, more generally, define how populations of separate entities develop in specific properties over time. They are a set of Integro-partial differential equations which gives the mean-field behavior of a population of particles from the analysis of behavior of single particle in local conditions. Particulate systems are characterized by the birth and death of particles. For example, consider precipitation process (formation of solid from liquid solution) which has the subprocesses nucleation, agglomeration, breakage, etc., that result in the increase or decrease of the number of particles of a particular radius (assuming formation of spherical particles). Population balance is nothing but a balance on the number of particles of a particular state (in this example, size).

== Formulation of PBE ==
Consider the average number of particles with particle properties denoted by a particle state vector (x,r) (where x corresponds to particle properties like size, density, etc. also known as internal coordinates and, r corresponds to spatial position or external coordinates) dispersed in a continuous phase defined by a phase vector Y(r,t) (which again is a function of all such vectors which denote the phase properties at various locations) is denoted by f(x,r,t). Hence it gives the particle characteristics in property and space domains. Let h(x,r,Y,t) denote the birth rate of particles per unit volume of particle state space, so the number conservation can be written as

$\frac{d}{dt} \int_{\Omega_x(t)} dV_x \int_{\Omega_r(t)} dV_r\,f(\mathbf{x},\mathbf{r},t) = \int_{\Omega_x(t)} dV_x \int_{\Omega_r(t)} dV_r\,h(\mathbf{x},\mathbf{r},\mathbf{Y},t)$

This is a generalized form of PBE.

== Solution to PBE ==
Monte Carlo methods , discretization methods, numerical techniques like Finite Volume Method and moment methods are mainly used to solve these equations. The choice depends on the application and computing infrastructure.
