= Arendo Joustra =

Dutch writer and journalist

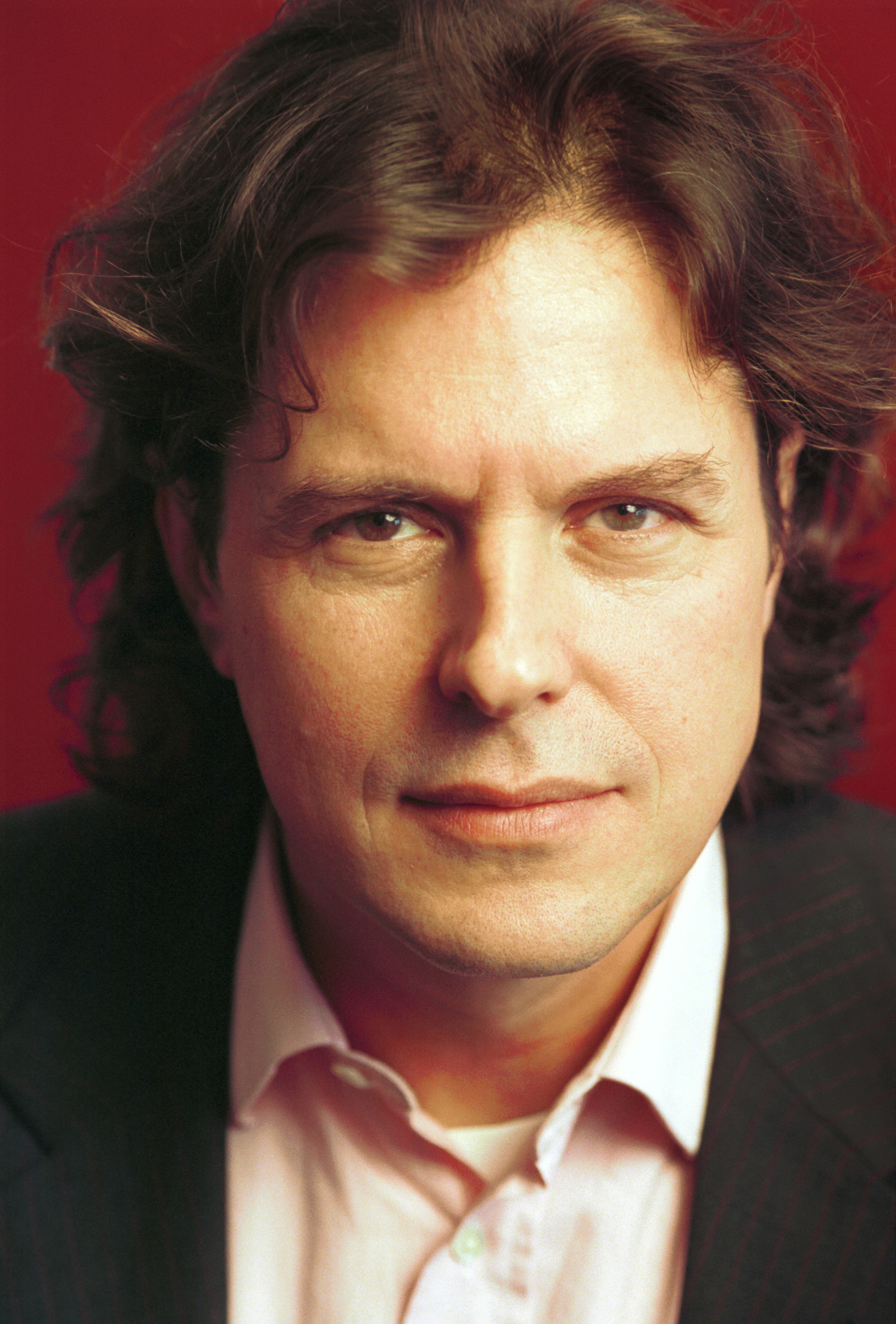
Arendo Joustra

Arendo Joustra (born 19 July 1957, in Vlissingen) is a Dutch writer and journalist.

Joustra was the editor in chief of the Dutch newsweekly Elsevier for 24 years and a commentator on politics and the Dutch monarchy. He is a co-author of books on the Dutch prime minister Ruud Lubbers and the author of a book on the Danish writer Karen Blixen. He studied journalism in Utrecht, the Netherlands, and at Iowa State University (1979–1980).

== Career ==
Before joining Elsevier as a reporter in 1989 he worked for eight years as a social affairs and political correspondent for the daily newspaper de Volkskrant. At Elsevier he was a political writer, bureau chief and correspondent in Brussels, Belgium, to cover European politics. He took on the role as deputy editor in 1996 and as editor in 2000.

He is a member (deputy chair) of the Supervisory Board of the Nederlands Instituut voor Beeld en Geluid in Hilversum, a member of the Academy of the Gouden Ganzenveer in Amsterdam, a board member of the Willem Oltmans Foundation in Amsterdam, and a member of the jury of the Zilveren Camera, a Dutch prize for photojournalism and documentary photography, in Hilversum.

From 2006 to 2010 Joustra served as president of the Nederlands Genootschap van Hoofdredacteuren, the Dutch Association of Editors. He was a member of the Board of Trustees of the Roosevelt Study Center, now called the Roosevelt Institute for American Studies, in Middelburg, the Netherlands (2013-2020), and of the Press Museum in Amsterdam, the Netherlands.

== Bibliography ==
=== As author ===
- 1987: Karen Blixen, Een Deense in Afrika, publisher Nijgh & Van Ditmar, Den Haag, ISBN 9023677919.
- 1988: Het Homo-erotisch Woordenboek, publisher Thomas Rap, ISBN 9060052668.
- 1997: Hof van Brussel, publisher Prometheus, Amsterdam, ISBN 90-57-1347-48.
- 2013: Vier relaties van Beatrix. Ruud Lubbers, Europa, de Prins-gemaal en de natie, publisher Elsevier Boeken, Amsterdam, ISBN 978-90-3525-121-2

=== As co-author ===
- 1984: Ambtenaren in actie, Reportage van een Hollandse herfst (with Pieter Broertjes), publisher Van Gennep, Amsterdam ISBN 9060125894.
- 1989: Ruud Lubbers, Manager in de politiek (with Erik van Venetië), publisher Anthos, Baarn, ISBN 9060746473.
- 1993: De Geheimen Van Het Torentje, Praktische Gids Voor Het Premierschap, publisher Prometheus, Amsterdam ISBN 9053331980.
- 1994: Het versleten corset van de Nederlandse letteren, Scheld- en bijnamen van en voor Nederlandse schrijvers, uitgevers en zo (with Jaap Scholten), publisher Thomas Rap, Amsterdam, ISBN 9060054865.

=== As editor ===
- 1991: Ruud Lubbers: Samen Onderweg, Over Democratie, Christendom & Samenleving, Economie en Internationale Vraagstukken, (editor, with Erik van Venetië), publisher Het Spectrum, Utrecht, ISBN 9027427801.
- 1993: Vreemde ogen, Buitenlanders over de Nederlandse identiteit, publisher Prometheus, Amsterdam ISBN 9053331751.
- 2010 Negenmannen, Oranjes & matpartijen, Elseviers Groot Politiek Lijstenboek (editor, with Jeroen Langelaar and Jos Widdershoven), publisher Elsevier Boeken, Amsterdam, ISBN 90-6882-978-5.
- 2010: Handboek hoofdredacteur. Hoe je het wordt, bent en blijft, publisher Uitgeverij EW, Amsterdam, ISBN 978-90-6882-998-3.
- 2011: De Oranjes. Verrassende feiten over ons Koningshuis, publisher Bertram+de Leeuw Uitgevers, Amsterdam, ISBN 978-94-6156-052-0.
- 2012: Wij mogen niet talmen. Alle regeringsverklaringen van Schermerhorn tot en met Van Agt, publisher Uitgeverij EW, Amsterdam, ISBN 978-90-6882-931-0.
- 2013: De Inhuldigingsrede van koning Willem-Alexander en die van zijn zes voorgangers, publisher Uitgeverij EW, Amsterdam,.
- 2013: Alle 33 Troonredes. Prinsjesdag onder koningin Beatrix, publisher Uitgeverij EW, Amsterdam, ISBN 978-90-352-5117-5.
- 2013: Alle 33 kersttoespraken. De persoonlijke redes van koningin Beatrix, publisher Uitgeverij EW, Amsterdam, ISBN 978-90-352-5118-2.
- 2015: Thom de Graaf, Wim Kok, Mark Rutte e.a., Kwetsbaar koningschap. Voor en tegen de modernisering van de monarchie, publisher Uitgeverij EW, Amsterdam, ISBN 978-90-352-5261-5.
- 2016: Elsevier's maandschrift. Over Elsevier's geïllustreerd maandschrift 1891-1940 Volledige tekst, publisher Uitgeverij EW, Amsterdam, ISBN 978-90-352-5297-4.
- 2017: Gerard Noodt, Over de soevereiniteit van het volk. Een revolutionaire rede uit 1699 over de opperste macht, publisher Uitgeverij EW, Amsterdam, ISBN 978-90-352-5301-8.
- 2017: Een titel maakt de mens niet. Alle Oranje-interviews uit Elsevier, publisher Uitgeverij EW, Amsterdam, ISBN 978-90-352-5345-2.
- 2018: Wacht op onze daden. Alle regeringsverklaringen van Schermerhorn tot en met Rutte, uitgeverij Uitgeverij EW, Amsterdam, ISBN 978-94-6348015-4.
- 2018: Beatrix 80. Reportages, interviews, beschouwingen en brieven uit Elsevier & haar beste toespraken, uitgeverij Uitgeverij EW, Amsterdam, ISBN 978-94-6348021-5.
- 2018: Gerard Noodt, Over de vrijheid van godsdienst. Een invloedrijke rede uit 1706 over religie, vrij van heerschappij, publisher Uitgeverij EW, Amsterdam, ISBN 978-94-6348058-1.
- 2018: In gesprek met de Oranjes (the transcripts of 22 interviews broadcast on television), Fontaine Uitgevers, ISBN 978-90-5956-871-6.
- 2019: Alles wat je moet weten over Nederland. Een liefhebbende gids, publisher Fontaine Uitgevers, ISBN 978-90-5956-895-2
- 2020: Sobibor begon in het Vondelpark. Toespraken van koning Willem-Alexander, publisher Uitgeverij Uitgeverij EW, ISBN 978-94-6348-077-2.
- 2021: Tabé. Het lange afscheid van Ons Indië, publisher Uitgeverij EW, ISBN 978-94-6348-086-4.
