= Elsevier Weekblad =

Dutch weekly news magazine

EW Magazine
- Editor: Hella Hueck
- Former editors: Arendo Joustra
- Categories: News and opinion magazine
- Frequency: Weekly
- Publisher: Roularta Media Group
- Total circulation: Print: 100.000 - 159.000 (2025)
- First issue: 27 October 1945
- Country: Netherlands
- Based in: Amsterdam
- Language: Dutch
- Website: www.ewmagazine.nl
- OCLC: 60615878

EW (formerly Elsevier Weekblad) is the largest Dutch weekly news and opinion magazine, with a reach of 159,000 (print, 2025). The magazine focuses mainly on politics, international affairs and business, where readers tend to be business decision-makers, highly educated, wealthy, entrepreneurial and travel-minded.

It presents itself as a mouthpiece for the “working backbone of the Netherlands” and aims to assist these groups with various choices relating to education, careers, fashion, personal and business-related finances, and leisure.

EW has stood for independent and in-depth background, opinion and analytical journalism. It produces a weekly magazine, a website, a podcast and newsletters. There are also several events per year like the annual HJ Schoo Lecture and the EW Economics Lecture, and selects the Dutch Person of the Year.

The editors have selected a “Dutch Person of the Year” annually since 2004. The choice is usually motivated by the argument that the individual has left a mark on the year, either positively or negatively. In some cases, the person is chosen because they are seen as symbolizing the year.

EW has published the annual EW 500 (or Top 500 Companies) since 24 November 2012, ranking the five hundred largest Dutch companies by revenue. The list also provides information on profit, solvency, number of employees, and type of company (such as publicly listed or family-owned). The ranking reflects the position in the preceding year.

The magazine has been titled EW since 1 December 2020. The name change was necessary because the owner of the “Elsevier” trademark, the British publishing group RELX, wished to use it exclusively for its internationally operating scientific publishing company Elsevier.

== History and profile ==
The predecessor of the magazine, Elsevier's Geïllustreerd Maandschrift (Elsevier's Illustrated Monthly), was first issued in January 1891 and was modelled after Harper's Magazine. It was published by J.G. Robbers and his Elsevier company, which had been founded in 1880 and took its name from the famous (but unrelated) Elzevir family of the 16th to 18th centuries.

In 1940, the magazine was prohibited by the German authorities, who occupied the Netherlands at the time, and the last issue of the magazine was issued in December that year.

Henk Lunshof, a journalist of De Telegraaf, had thought of establishing a new news magazine since 1940. He was approached by Jan Pieter Klautz, director of the publishing company Elsevier, and the two secretly started preparing the establishment of the magazine. They were assisted by G.B.J. Hiltermann, another former journalist of De Telegraaf.

The magazine was finally introduced as Elseviers Weekblad ("Elsevier's Weekly") on 27 October 1945, and Lunshof became its editor. Its aim was to take an independent position, not linked to any political party or association.

By the end of the 1940s, however, EW adopted a clear position against the independence of Indonesia, after which it developed a socially conservative and economically liberal signature, closely linked to the liberals of the VVD and the Catholics of the KVP. The magazine was an instant success and very profitable. The expansion of Elsevier in the scientific field after 1945 was funded with the profits of the newsweekly.

Communists would later become enemies with Elsevier Weekblad. This and the increasingly old-fashioned image of the magazine sparked the demand for a new leadership and a new formula. The new editor in chief, André Spoor, formerly editor in chief of NRC Handelsblad, renewed the redaction, changed the layout and shortened the name to Elsevier.

In the following years, the magazine lost its literary character and started focusing on journalism. It claims that while opinion pieces remained, it became less ideological and more factual.

As of 1 December 2016, Elsevier Weekblad was published by ONE Business, a subsidiary of New Skool Media. On 22 December 2021, the Belgian publisher Roularta announced its intention to acquire New Skool Media. Starting with issue 14, volume 78 (14 April 2022), Roularta Media Group has been listed as the publisher of EW Magazine.

== Circulation ==
The current print circulation in 2025 is estimated at between 100,000 and 159,000 copies.
