= List of educational institutions in Nagpur =

The city of Nagpur is an educational hub for the central India region, hosting a number of institutions of higher education.

== Universities ==
=== State University ===
- Maharashtra Animal and Fishery Sciences University
- Maharashtra National Law University, Nagpur
- Rashtrasant Tukadoji Maharaj Nagpur University (Nagpur University)

=== Deemed Universities ===
- Laxminarayan Innovation Technological University
- Symbiosis International University - Nagpur campus

== Engineering and Technology ==
=== Central government ===
- Indian Institute of Information Technology, Nagpur
- Visvesvaraya National Institute of Technology Nagpur

=== State government ===
- Indian Institute of Fire Engineering, Nagpur
- Laxminarayan Innovation Technological University

=== Other ===
- Cummins College of Engineering for Women, Nagpur
- G. H. Raisoni College of Engineering Nagpur
- Ramdeobaba University
- S. B. Jain Institute of Technology, Management and Research
- St. Vincent Pallotti College of Engineering and Technology
- Wainganga College of Engineering and Management
- Yashwantrao Chavan College of Engineering

=== Non-Autonomous ===
- Institute of Science, Nagpur
- Jhulelal Institute of Technology
- Wainganga College of Engineering and Management

== Polytechnics ==
- Government Polytechnic, Nagpur

== Law ==
- Maharashtra National Law University, Nagpur
- Symbiosis Law School, Nagpur

== Management ==
- Indian Institute of Management Nagpur
- Institute of Management Technology, Nagpur
- Shri Ramdeobaba College of Engineering and Management

== Arts, Commerce and Science ==
- Dhanwate National College, Nagpur
- G.H. Raisoni Department of Microbiology and Biotechnology
- G.S. College of Commerce and Economics, Nagpur
- Hislop College
- Institute of Science, Nagpur
- Vasantrao Naik Government Institute of Arts and Social Sciences

== Medical ==
- All India Institute of Medical Sciences, Nagpur
- Government Medical College and Hospital, Nagpur
- Indira Gandhi Government Medical College, Nagpur
