= WCEM =

WCEM may refer to:

- WCEM (AM), a radio station (1240 AM) licensed to Cambridge, Maryland, United States
- WCEM-FM, a radio station (106.3 FM) licensed to Cambridge, Maryland, United States
- Wainganga College of Engineering and Management, Wardha Road, Nagpur
