= Vaman Krushna Chorghade =

Marathi writer

Vaman Krushna Chorghade (16 July 1914 – 1 December 1995) was a Marathi writer from Maharashtra, India. He was born in Narkhed, Nagpur District and received a master's degree in Marathi and Economics, along with a bachelor's degree in education. His writings strongly reflected Gandhian philosophy.

== Life ==
As a follower of Mahatma Gandhi, Chorghade participated in India's movement for independence from the British Raj. He served for many years as an economics professor at a college in Wardha, before moving on to become the vice-principal of G. S. College of Commerce and Economics in Nagpur. For some time, he chaired the Text Books Board of Maharashtra state government.

In 1979, he presided over the 53rd Marathi Sahitya Sammelan (an annual conference for Marathi-language writers) at Chandrapur.

== Bibliography ==
The following is a partial list of collections of Chorghade's short stories:

- सुषमा (1936)
- पाथेय (1953)
- प्रदीप (1954)
- हवन
- यौवन
- प्रस्थान
- देवाचे काम
- ख्याल
- चोरघडे यांची कथा (1960)
- संपूर्ण चोरघडे (1966)

जडणघडण (1981) is an autobiographical work of Chorghade pertaining to his literary career.
