= Jita =

Jita may refer to:

- Jita people, of Tanzania
- Jita language, their Bantu language
- Jita, Nepal, a village development committee
- Jita Singh (born 1949), Singaporean football coach
- Ali Jita (born 1983), Nigerian singer, songwriter and musician
- Jita 4-4, the main trade hub in EVE Online

== See also ==
- Jeet (disambiguation)
- JIT (disambiguation)
- Jitu (disambiguation)
- Jitan Ram Manjhi, former chief minister of Bihar, India
- Jithan, a 2005 Indian horror-comedy film
  - Jithan 2, its 2014 sequel
