= JIT =

JIT or Jit may refer to:

- Just-in-time compilation
- Just-in-time manufacturing, a concept closely related to lean manufacturing
- Jhulelal Institute of Technology, Nagpur University, India
- Joint investigation team, investigating cross-border crime
- Jit, a style of Zimbabwean dance music
- Jit (film), a 1990 Zimbabwean film
- Jit, Qalqilya, a Palestinian town in the West Bank
- Jit Bose, Indian-Canadian mathematician and computer scientist
- Jit Samaroo (1950–2016), Indo-Trinidadian musician
- Jit Singh (born 1937), Indian wrestler

== See also ==
- Jeet (disambiguation)
- Jita (disambiguation)
- Jitu (disambiguation)
- Just in Time (disambiguation)
