= Jitu (disambiguation) =

Jitu is a village in Iran

Jitu or Jeetu may also refer to:

== Places ==
- Jitu, Siliguri, a census town in Darjeeling district, India

== People with the given name ==
- Jitu Bhagat (born 1962), in full Jitendrakumar Ramanlal Patel, Indian BJP politician, Member of the Legislative Assembly of Gujarat, general secretary of BJP in Ahmedabad
- Jitu Goswami, Indian BJP politician, Member of the Legislative Assembly of Assam
- Jitu Jirati (born 1976), Indian politician
- Jitu Patnaik, Indian politician, former Member of the Legislative Assembly of Odisha
- Jitu Patwari (born 1973), Indian INC politician, former minister in Madhya Pradesh and the current president of INC in Madhya Pradesh
- Jitu Rai (born 1996), Indian shooter of Nepalese origin
- Jitu Soni (born 1969), Tanzanian CCM politician
- Jitu Vaghani (born 1970), in full Jitendrabhai Savjibhai Vaghani, Indian politician, Member of the Legislative Assembly of Gujarat
- Jitu Weusi (1939–2013), American educator
- Jeetu Kamal, Indian actor in Bengali cinema
- Jeetu Nepal, in full Jeet Bahadur Nepal, Nepalese stand-up comedian
- Jeetu Verma, Indian actor in Hindi cinema

== See also ==
- Jeet (disambiguation)
- Jita (disambiguation)
- JIT (disambiguation)
- Jithu Madhavan, Indian filmmaker
- Jeethu Joseph (born 1972), Indian film director
