= Green Heaven =

Green Heaven may refer to:

- Green Heaven UAV, a series of Chinese UAVs developed by Lechang
- "Green Heaven" (song), a 1984 song by the 'Red Hot Chili Peppers' off their eponymous album The Red Hot Chili Peppers (album)
- Green Heaven (film; Chinese: 碧雲天), a 1953 film by the Shaw Brothers, see List of Shaw Brothers films
- Green Heaven (Chinese: 蒼天; pinyin: Cāng Tiān), a heaven of Chinese mythology; see Chinese folk religion
- Green Heaven Institute of Management and Research, Nagpur, Maharashtra, India; see List of educational institutions in Nagpur
- Green Heaven, Permas Jaya, Johor Bahru, Johor, Malaysia; a building, see List of tallest buildings in Johor Bahru

== See also ==
- The dictionary definition of 蒼天 at Wiktionary
- Green Hell (disambiguation)
- Heaven (disambiguation)
- Green (disambiguation)
