= Laxminarayan Innovation Technological University =

India's technical college

- Former names: Laxminarayan Institute of Technology (LIT)
- Type: State university
- Established: 1942; 84 years ago
- Accreditation: NBA, NAAC A+
- Chancellor: Governor of Maharashtra
- Vice-Chancellor: Dr. Atul Vaidya
- Students: 210
- Undergraduates: 150
- Postgraduates: 60
- Doctoral students: Yes
- Location: Nagpur, Maharashtra, India
- Campus: 78 acres (32 ha); Urban
- Nickname: LITians
- Website: litu.edu.in

Laxminarayan Innovation Technological University (LITU) is a public state university of the Government of Maharashtra situated at Nagpur, Maharashtra, India. It was established in 1942 and is one of the oldest engineering colleges for Chemical Engineering and Technology in India.

== History ==
The Laxminarayan Innovation Technological University is one of the premier institutes in India for Chemical Engineering. The land, donated by Rao Bahadur D. Laxminarayan, housed both the Nagpur University and the Institute. The Laxminarayan Institute of Technology was founded in 1942 by Laxminarayan of Kamptee. His work brought him into contact with complex problems that required the aid of technologists. He believed the lack of qualified thinkers should not stand in the way of progress, so he donated the main part of his property, then estimated at ₹ 3,520,540 to the Nagpur University in his will dated 3 May 1930, for "Teaching of Applied Science and Chemistry". Subsequently, a committee was appointed by Nagpur University on 6 February 1932, known as the "Bequest Scheme Committee", that consisted of notable men from the fields of science, industry, and public affairs throughout India. The committee recommended establishing an Institute of Technology to teach industrial chemistry with particular emphasis on the application of science to the industrial development of the province, then known as the Central Provinces and Berar.

In 1934, the scheme was prepared for starting a two-year BSc (Tech) course. The present site for the Institute was selected in the year 1936 by Harisingh Gour. In 1937, the University appointed Ram Simha Thakur as the officer-on-special duty to oversee the construction of the Institute.

The Institute started functioning with admissions into a two-year BSc (Tech) program in Chemical Engineering, Chemical Technology, and Oil Technology on 1 August 1942 with S.A. Saletore, Professor of Organic Chemistry (Applied) as Director-in-Charge. It was officially inaugurated on 9 January 1943 by N.R. Sirkar.

The development from 1942 to 1947 was not very noteworthy because of World War II. However, the students' numbers increased to 34, and 11 members of the staff were appointed.

On 28 July 1945, the Executive Committee of the Nagpur University appointed R. B. Forster, the then-Head of the Department of Chemical Technology at the University of Bombay as Director of the Institute. Ing. H. G. Kayser took over as the Director in 1950, succeeded by P. S. Mene in 1951. The number of admissions increased to 36 and the four-year degree course started in 1951. The courses of study were revised to provide for more intensive specializations.

In 1959, the Ministry of Education recommended a recurring grant for the building and equipment. The AICTE (All India Council for Technical Education) decided to increase the intake of engineering graduates in all institutions and recommended that the Laxminarayan Institute of Technology should admit 60 students instead of 36 and start a 5 Year Integrated Course in Chemical Engineering. In 1969, the University Grants Commission (UGC) gave an additional grant for starting a three-year BSc (Tech) course in Oil Technology. The Institute took in sixty students to start the Five Year Integrated Course in 1967. During these years, the post-graduate degrees of Nagpur University in the field of Technology were awarded on the basis of a research thesis. The MTech courses (Petro-Chemical Technology, Oil Technology, Paint Technology, and Chemical Engineering) began in 1967 and were pursued more in 1969.

The institute introduced two new courses in 1971: three-year programs in Food and Petro-chemical Technology. In 1976, a BSc Technology. course in Cellulose Technology was introduced.

In response to the new educational pattern of 10+2, the Institute introduced a Four Year BTech (Chemical Engineering) course and the first set of students were admitted in 1977. In 1994, the Institute discontinued its BSc.Tech. course and replaced it with a new BTech course in Chemical Technology with a specialization in Petrochemical Technology, Food Technology, Pulp & Paper Technology, Oil Technology, and Plastic & Polymer Technology. Presently, the Institute offers a Four Year BTech (Chemical Engineering) program, Four Year BTech program in Chemical Technology with areas of specialization such as Petrochemical Technology, Food Technology, Pulp & Paper Technology, Oil Technology, Plastic & Polymer Technology, and Surface Coating Technology.

Both the houses of Maharashtra state legislature have passed the Bill of Laxminarayan Innovation Technological University (LITU). On 3 August 2023 by Legislative assembly and on 4 August 2023 by legislative council unanimously passed the bill during the monsoon session of state Legislature.

== Admissions ==
Admissions to the undergraduate course are done through the Maharashtra Health and Technical Common Entrance Test and JEE Mains. The Institute offers programs through seven disciplines.

- Chemical Engineering
- Food Technology
- Petroleum Refining and Petrochemicals Technology
- Surface-coating Technology
- Paper and Pulp Technology
- Oils, Fats and Surfactants Technology
- Plastics and Polymers Technology

== Rankings ==
The institute was ranked no. 46 in Mint C-Fore Top Government Engineering College Rankings in 2008 and has consistently found its place among the top fifty engineering colleges in India in leading education surveys.

The National Institutional Ranking Framework (NIRF) ranked it in the 200-250 band among engineering colleges in 2021.

== Accreditations ==
The institute has been accredited with A+ grade by the National Assessment and Accreditation Council (NAAC) with a score of CGPA 3.48 out of 4.

== Notable alumni ==
- Harish Bhimani, Indian voiceover artiste, writer and anchor. He is the voice of Samay (Time), the narrator of the TV series Mahabharat.
- Suresh Kashinath Haware, nuclear scientist, politician and managing director of Haware Engineers & Builders Pvt. Ltd
- B. D. Kulkarni, Distinguished Scientist of Chemical Engineering and Process Development at the National Chemical Laboratory, Pune.
- G. S. Laddha, former director of Alagappa College of Technology.

== Infrastructure ==
Institute has a campus of about 78 acres (320,000 m^{2}) located at Amravati Road in the western part of the city and houses all the departments of the Institute.

== See also ==
- Nagpur
- Nagpur University
- List of educational institutions in Nagpur
