= S. B. Jain Institute of Technology, Management and Research =

College in Nagpur, India

S. B. Jain Institute of Technology, Management & Research
- Other name: SBJITMR
- Former name: S B Jain College of Engineering
- Type: Private co-educational
- Established: 2008
- Affiliations: Autonomous College Affiliated to RTMNU
- Principal: Dr. Sanjay L. Badjate
- Faculty: 110
- Students: 1967
- Location: Nagpur, Maharashtra, India
- Campus: Rural, 14 acres (5.7 ha)
- Website: www.sbjit.edu.in

S. B. Jain Institute of Technology, Management and Research (SBJITMR) an autonomous institute, formerly known as S B Jain College of Engineering, is a college in Nagpur, India. It was established in 2008 by the Shantilal Badjate Charitable Trust. The institute is sanctioned by AICTE in New Delhi, DTE in Mumbai, and is partnered to Nagpur University.

== History ==
The institution was established in 2008 by the Shantilal Badjate Charitable Trust, an initiative of Shri Shantilalji Badjate, who devoted his life to education.

In February 2018, the Institute held the annual event "Technostav", which ran for three days and which was organized by the "Student Representative Council". The 2019 edition of the event was also held and ran from 23 to 25 January 2019, and this was also supported by the "Central Decipline [sic] Team".

In March 2021, the University Grants Commission and Rashtrasant Tukadoji Maharaj Nagpur University granted autonomous status to the Institute for 10 years from the 2020-2021 academic session.

== Campus ==
The institute is situated on a 14-acre (5.7 ha) campus that was designed with a British architectural pattern.

== Departments ==
- Electrical Engineering
- Electronics and Telecommunication Engineering
- Artificial Intelligence & Data Science
- Electronics Engineering
- Computer Science and Engineering
- Emerging Technologies [AI&DS]
- Mechanical Engineering
- Business Administration (MBA)
- Electronics Engineering (M.Tech)
- Artificial Intelligence & Machine Learning (Extinct)

== Admission ==
- Passing the HSSC or its equivalent exam with Physics, Chemistry/Biotechnology/Biology/Technical Vocational subject & Mathematics as subjects is a prerequisite.
- Candidates shall also have appeared in JEE (Mains) in that particular academic year.

== Student life ==
=== Scholarships ===
SB Jain Institute offers merit-based scholarships a needs-based scholarship named the "late Mrs. Jaswantiben Anantrai Parekh need-based scholarship", under the aegis of the Sir Shantilal Badjate Charitable Trust Nagpur, for students belonging to economically weaker families.

=== College fest ===
Technotsav is a national-level technical event with participation from many reputed engineering colleges in India. It has various events including technical paper presentations, line tracer robots, RoboWars, LAN gaming, and sports activities. Eminent speakers like Shri. Nitinji Gadkari, Transport minister under the BJP central cabinet, and Shri Devendra Fadnavis, Chief Minister of Maharashtra have spoken at this event.

=== Student associations ===
- Students Representative Council (SRC)
- IEEE Student Branch
- Emergicon (Departmental Forum of Emerging Technologies Department)
- Department of Training & Placement
- SuiGeneris (Departmental Forum of CSE Department)
- ELAN (Departmental Forum of Electrical Department)
- FEETA (Departmental Forum of ETC-ETRX Department)
- AIMES (Departmental Forum of Mechanical Department)

The placement policies and other related activities are handled by T & P Officer in consultation with the Principal and the college management.

== Recognition ==
In June 2021, Zee Digital recognized the Institute in the Edufuture Excellence Awards as an "Outstanding Business School (West)".
