= Harish Bhimani =

Indian voiceover artist, writer and anchor

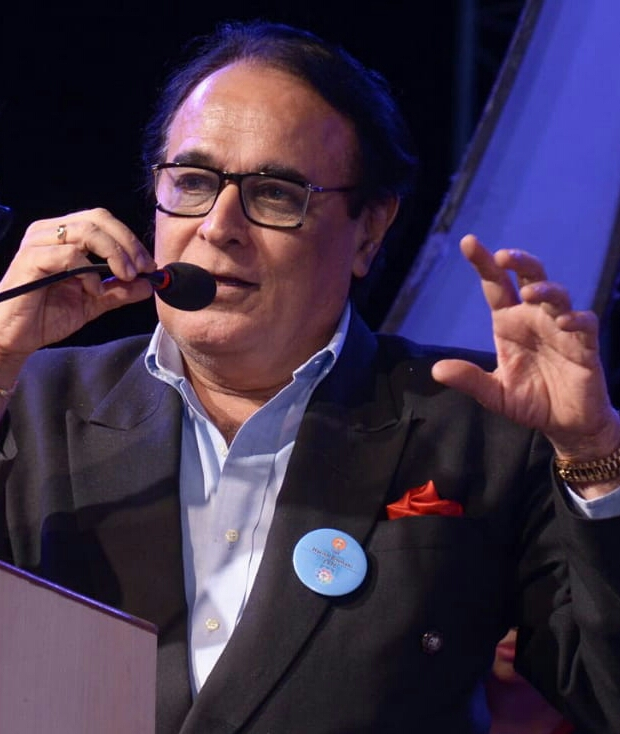
- Born: 15 February 1956 (age 70); Mumbai, Maharashtra, India
- Citizenship: India
- Education: Laxminarayan Innovation Technological University (B.E); Jamnalal Bajaj Institute of Management Studies (MBA)
- Occupations: Voiceover artiste, anchor, writer
- Known for: 'Samay' of Mahabharat
- Relatives: Kishore Bhimani (brother)
- Awards: National Film Award for Best Non-Feature Film Narration / Voice Over (2015)
- Website: Official Website

Harish Bhimani (born 15 February 1956) is an Indian voiceover artiste, writer and anchor. He was the voice of Samay (Time), the narrator of the TV series Mahabharat.

== Personal life ==
Harish was born in Mumbai, Maharashtra on 15 February 1956. His brother Kishore Bhimani was a sports journalist and cricket commentator. Harish completed his graduation from LITU, Nagpur, (previously LIT Nagpur) and MBA from Jamnalal Bajaj Institute of Management Studies (JBIMS), Mumbai.

== Career ==
He started with TV news anchoring on Bombay TV; from narrating the Mahabharat to the legendary playback singer Lata Mangeshkar's biography titled In Search of Lata Mangeshkar, Ajeeb Dastan Hai Yeh (1995).

He is set to be the voice of the god Shiva in the multiplayer online battle arena (MOBA) game Smite.

== Awards ==
Harish was conferred with the coveted (63rd) National Award for Voiceovers/Narration in 2015.

== Works ==
- Lata Didi Ajeeb Dastan Hai Yeh (Hindi). 1995, ISBN 978-93-5000-018-2.
