= G. S. Laddha =

Indian chemical engineer

- Born: 26 August 1922; India
- Died: 2010
- Education: Laxminarayan Institute of Technology (B.Sc); Purdue University (PhD)
- Known for: Research on liquid–liquid extraction and crystal growth
- Awards: 1980 IIChE Ambrose Congreve award 1995 Anna University (D.Sc) 2001 Burjor P. Godrej lifetime achievement award
- Scientific career
- Fields: Chemical Engineering

G. S. Laddha (26 August 1922 – 2010) was an Indian chemical engineer. He was known for his research on liquid–liquid extraction at Alagappa College of Technology, Anna University, and his contribution for the establishment of several chemical industries in India. He played a major role in the progress review committee of IIT Madras which was constituted by the President of India. He took part in the formation of Indian Institute of Chemical Engineers and served as its president. He died in 2010.

== Early life and education ==
Laddha was born in India in August 1922. He attained his B.Sc. at Laxminarayan Institute of Technology (LIT) in Nagpur in 1944. and completed his Ph. D.(1949) at Purdue University in United States.

== Career ==
Laddha was the director of Alagappa College of Technology for more than 30 years. His research in Crystal growth led to the establishment of Crystal growth center in Anna University.

The first recipient of the Ambrose Congreve award and the honour of Chemical Engineer of the Year (1980) nominated by the Indian Institute of Chemical Engineers,

In the 1980s he established the Chennai Regional Centre of IIChE.

On 1 September 1995, Anna University conferred on Prof Laddha the degree of D.Sc. (Honoris Causa).

In 2001 he was presented with the Dr. Burjor P. Godrej lifetime achievement award at the Indian Chemical Engineering Congress.

The Indian Institute of Chemical Engineers has instituted an award in his name "Prof G S Laddha Chemcon Distinguished speaker award". The Alagappa College of Technology awards renowned academics with an award "Professor G S Laddha Distinguished Professorship award". He was honoured by the governor of Tamil Nadu for his contributions to Chemical Engineering. He also served as a director of Chemplast Sanmar Limited.

== Selected publications ==
- G. S. Laddha; T. E. Degaleesan (1978). Transport phenomena in liquid extraction. McGraw-Hill.
- G. S. Laddha (1976). Towards the Establishment of the Department of Space Science. University of Madras.
