= B. D. Kulkarni =

Indian chemical engineer (1949–2019)

- Born: 5 May 1949; Nagpur, Maharashtra, India
- Died: 14 January 2019 (aged 69); Pune, India
- Education: Laxminarayan Institute of Technology; National Chemical Laboratory
- Known for: Development of delayed diffusion concept in chemical reaction engineering
- Awards: 1981 INSA Young Scientist Medal; 1981 IIChE Amar Dye Chem Award; 1988 Herdillia Award; 1988 Shanti Swarup Bhatnagar Prize; 1992 NCL Best Scientist of the Year; 2000 ChemTech-CEW Award; 2000 FICCI Award
- Scientific career
- Fields: Chemical reaction engineering
- Workplaces: National Chemical Laboratory
- Doctoral advisor: L. K. Doraiswamy

Bhaskar Dattatraya Kulkarni (5 May 1949 – 14 January 2019), popularly known as B. D. among his friends and colleagues, was an Indian chemical reaction engineer and a Distinguished Scientist of Chemical Engineering and Process Development at the National Chemical Laboratory, Pune. An INSA Senior Scientist and a J. C. Bose fellow, he was known for his work on fluidized bed reactors and chemical reactors. He is an elected fellow of the Indian Academy of Sciences, Indian National Science Academy, The World Academy of Sciences and the Indian National Academy of Engineering. The Council of Scientific and Industrial Research, the apex agency of the Government of India for scientific research, awarded him the Shanti Swarup Bhatnagar Prize for Science and Technology, one of the highest Indian science awards for his contributions to Engineering Sciences in 1988. (Note: Long link - please select award year to see details)

== Biography ==
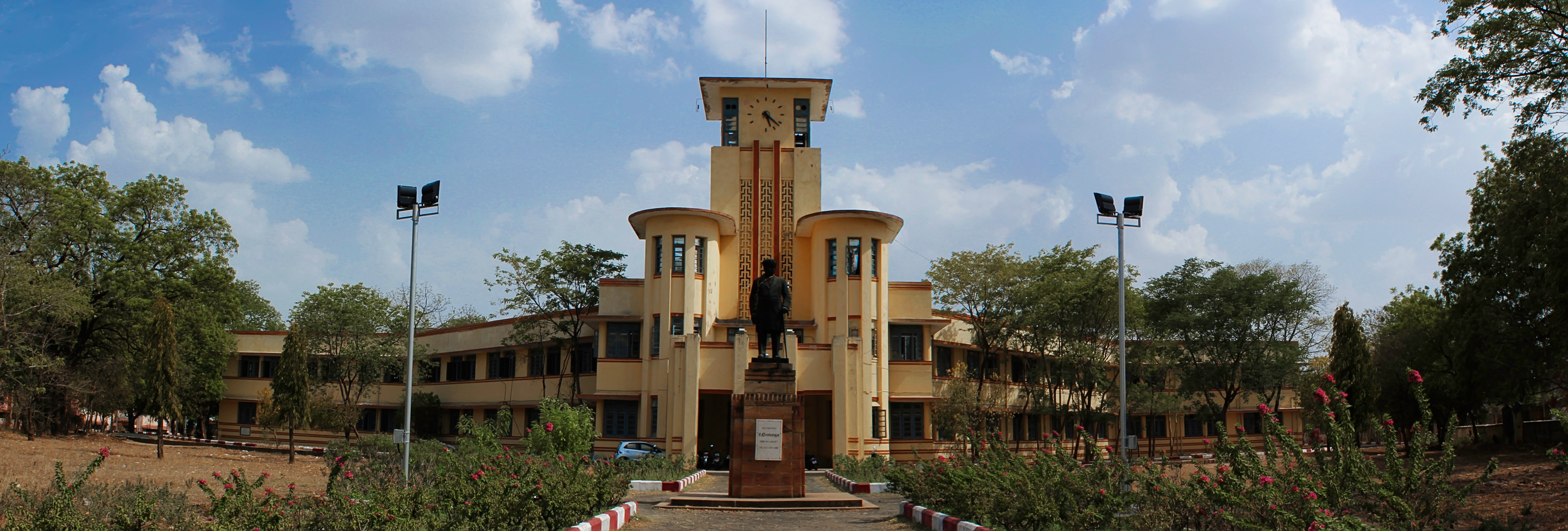
Laxminarayan Institute of Technology

B. D. Kulkarni, born on 5 May 1949 into a Deshastha Brahmin family in Nagpur in the western Indian state of Maharashtra, did his schooling at New English High School and after passing the matriculation with distinction in 1964, he did his pre-university course at Hislop College before joining Laxminarayan Institute of Technology of Nagpur University from where he graduated in chemical engineering in 1970. He continued there to complete his master's degree in chemical engineering in 1972 and enrolled at National Chemical Laboratory, Pune (NCL) in 1973 for his doctoral degree under the guidance of L. K. Doraiswamy, a noted chemical engineer and Padma Bhushan recipient. He worked under Doraiswamy, who is credited with developing Organic Synthesis Engineering as a definitive scientific stream, and secured a PhD in 1978 during which time he was invited by Man Mohan Sharma, a Padma Vibhushan laureate, to join the Institute of Chemical Technology, Mumbai but, on advice from Doraiswamy, he remained at NCL where he would spend the rest of his career. He served the institution in various capacities as Scientist C (1979–84), Scientist EI (1984–88), Scientist EII (1988), Scientist F (1988–93) and superannuated as Scientist G in 2010. On the administration front, he served as the Deputy Director and Head of the Chemical Engineering Division. Post-retirement, he served NCL as a Distinguished Scientist and continues his researches.

== Career ==
Fluidized Bed Reactor Graphic

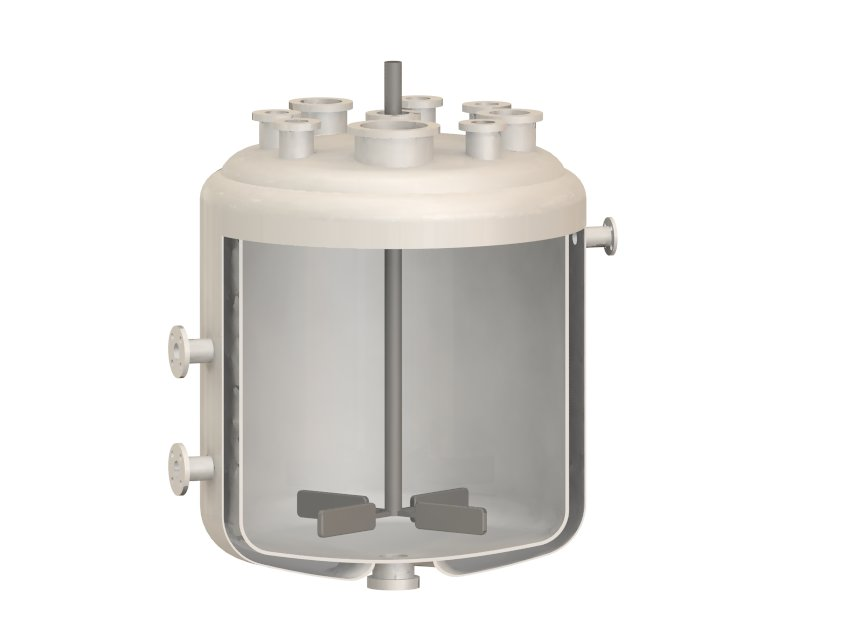
Batch reactor

Kulkarni's researches were mainly in the fields of Chemical Reaction Engineering, Applied Mathematics and Transport phenomena and he is known for his work on fluidized bed reactors and chemical reactors. He is credited with introducing an integer-solution approach and novel ideas on noise-induced transitions and his work on Artificial Intelligence-based evolutionary formalisms is reported to have assisted in a better understanding of reacting and reactor systems. His work spanned from conventional chemical reaction engineering in gas-liquid and gas-solid catalytic reactions to reactor stability to stochastic analysis of chemically reacting systems as well as inter-disciplinary fields. A model reaction system termed Encillator, an analytical approach for the solving model equations based on arithmetics, use of initial value formalism for modelling fluidized-bed reactors, introduction of normal form theory, evolutionary algorithms and stochastic approximation in analysing reactor behavior and performance are some of the contributions made by him. He holds US and Indian patents for several processes he has developed which include Method and an Apparatus for the Identification and/or Separation of Complex Composite Signals into its Deterministic and Noisy Components, Process for preparation of pure alkyl esters from alkali metal salt of carboxylic acid, and Enantioselective resolution process for arylpropionic acid drugs from the racemic mixture.

Kulakrni's researches have been documented in several peer-reviewed articles; (Note: Please see Selected articles section) and the online article repository of Indian Academy of Sciences has listed 250 of them. Besides, he has contributed chapters to books edited by others and has published seven edited or authored texts, including Recent Trends in Chemical Reaction Engineering, Advances in Transport Processes, The Analysis of Chemically Reacting Systems: A Stochastic Approach and Transport processes in fluidized bed reactors. He has guided several master's and doctoral scholars in their studies and has conducted training for students on mathematical modelling. He also serves as one of the directors of Hitech Bio Sciences India Limited, a probiotics and nutraceuticals manufacturer based in Pune and is a member of the advisory committee of the International Conference on Sustainable Development for Energy and Environment (ICSDEE 2017).

== Awards and honors ==
The Indian National Science Academy awarded Kulkarni the Young Scientist Medal in 1981, making him the first chemical engineer to receive the honor. He received another award in 1981, the Amar Dye Chem Award of the Indian Institute of Chemical Engineers; IIChE would honor him again in 1988 with the Herdillia Award for Excellence in Basic Research in Chemical Engineering. The Council of Scientific and Industrial Research awarded him the Shanti Swarup Bhatnagar Prize, one of the highest Indian science awards the same year. The National Chemical Laboratory selected him s the Best Scientist of the Year in 1992 and the year 2000 brought him two awards, ChemTech-CEW Award of the ChemTech Foundation and the FICCI Award of the Federation of Indian Chambers of Commerce & Industry.

Kulkarni, a CSIR Distinguished Scientist at NCL, was elected as a fellow by Maharashtra Academy of Sciences in 1988, the same year as he became a fellow of the Indian Academy of Sciences. He received the elected fellowship of the Indian National Academy of Engineering and the Golden Jubilee Fellowship of the Institute of Chemical Technology (then known as the University Department of Chemical Technology-UDCT) in 1989. The Indian National Science Academy elected him as a fellow in 1990 and The World Academy of Sciences chose him as an elected fellow in 2002. When the Science and Engineering Research Board of the Department of Science and Technology selected scientists for the J. C. Bose National Fellowship in 2009, he was also included in the list of recipients. Industrial & Engineering Chemistry Research, the official journal of the American Chemical Society, issued a festschrift on him in 2009 titled Kulkarni Issue with the guest editorial written by his mentor, L. K. Doraiswmy and the issue featured his biosketch jointly written by Ganapati D. Yadav, V. K. Jayaraman and V. Ravikumar, all known chemical engineers.

== Selective work ==
=== Books ===
- B. D. Kulkarni (1987). Recent Trends in Chemical Reaction Engineering. Wiley Eastern Limited. ISBN 978-0-85226-509-3.
- A.S. Mujumdar; Laxmangudi Krishnamurthy Doraiswamy; B. D. Kulkarni (1987). Advances in Transport Processes. Wiley Eastern.
- Laxmangudi Krishnamurthy Doraiswamy; B. D. Kulkarni (January 1987). The Analysis of Chemically Reacting Systems: A Stochastic Approach. Taylor & Francis. ISBN 978-0-677-21670-6.
- Laxmangudi Krishnamurthy Doraiswamy; B. D. Kulkarni (1 January 1987). Transport processes in fluidized bed reactors. Wiley Eastern. ISBN 978-0-85226-171-2.

=== Chapters ===
- L. K. Doraisway; B. D, Kulkarni (29 September 1986). "Gas-Solid Non-catalytic Reactions". In Carberry (ed.). Chemical Reaction and Reactor Engineering. CRC Press. pp. 293–. ISBN 978-0-8247-7543-8.

=== Patents ===
- Viruthiamparambath Ravi Kumar; Bhaskar Dattatraya Kulkarni; Narendra Madhukar Dixit; Nitin Vaish (27 March 2001). "Method and an Apparatus for the Identification and/or Separation of Complex Composite Signals into its Deterministic and Noisy Components". US 6208951 B1. Google Patents.
- Prashant Purushottam Barve, Bhaskar Dattatraya Kulkarni, Milind Yashwant Gupte, Sanjay Narayan Nene, Ravindra William Shinde (5 May 2011). "Process for preparation of pure alkyl esters from alkali metal salt of carboxylic acid". WO 2011027211 A3. Google Patents.
- Nirmal Kishor Yadav, Bhaskar Dattatraya Kulkarni, Ramdas Bhagvan Khomane (15 March 1999). "Enantioselective resolution process for arylpropionic acid drugs from the racemic mixture". US6093830 A. Google Patents.

== See also ==
- List of chemical engineers
- History of chemical engineering
