= Kishore Bhimani =

Indian sports journalist (1939–2020)

Kishore Bhimani (28 February 1939 – 15 October 2020) was a veteran sports journalist and cricket commentator. He continued sports journalism for nearly four decades. According to veteran cricketer Bishan Singh Bedi "he was one of the good Old Fashioned Crkt writer who took Crkt writings like a player who takes to playing".

== Personal life ==
Bhimani went to England to study at London School Of Economics in the 1960s. He completed his graduation from there, prior to which he was a contestant on the first ever series of University Challenge. Bhimani was married to Rita and couple have a son Goutam who is a cricket commentator. His brother Harish Bhimani is a famous voiceover artist.

== Career ==
Bhimani had worked for The Statesman, English newspaper as a columnist. He had worked as a commentator at Akashbani and Doordarshan. Bhimani was most recognised English voice in 1980s. From 1978 to 1980 Bhimani was the president of Calcutta Sports Journalists Club.

== Death ==
Bhimani was admitted in a private hospital at Kolkata for a month. He died on 15 October 2020 at Woodland Nursing home at Kolkata due to COVID-19 infection.

== Book ==
Books include:

1. Director's special book of cricket, first published in 1992 ISBN 81-7023-507-3
2. The Accidental Godman', first published in 2012 ISBN 9789381506134

== Awards ==
Bhimani had received H&G Clinic Lifetime Achievement Award in 2012 by former Indian cricketer Ravi Shastri for his outstanding contribution in media and sports commentary.
