= Jeet =

Jeet may refer to these in Indian cinema:

- Jeet (1949 film), a Hindi film starring Dev Anand and Durga Khote
- Jeet (1972 film), a Hindi film by Adurthi Subba Rao
- Jeet (1996 film), a Hindi film by Raj Kanwar
- Thamizhan, a Tamil film by Majith, Hindi title Jeet: Born to Win
- Jeet (TV series), Indian television series which aired on Star Plus
- Jeet (actor) (born 1978), Indian actor
- Jeet Gannguli (born 1977), Indian music composer and singer
- Jeet Heer, Indian-Canadian writer
- Jeet Raval, Indian-New Zealand cricketer
- Jeet Thayil (born 1959), Indian writer
- Jeet, shortened form of pajeet, a derogatory and offensive ethnic slur for Indian people

== See also ==
- JIT (disambiguation)
- Jita (disambiguation)
- Jitu (disambiguation)
