= Directorate of Technical Education, Maharashtra =

Directorate of Technical Education, Mumbai
- Legal status: Active
- Purpose: Agency responsible for technical education in maharashtra state, conducting state common entrance tests, counselling and admission process.
- Headquarters: Mumbai
- Coordinates: 19°04′34″N 72°52′40″E
- Region served: Maharashtra
- Parent organisation: Government of Maharashtra India
- Website: dtemaharashtra.gov.in

The Directorate of Technical Education Maharashtra has more than 2000 educational institutions in the state use DTE Maharashtra exams.

The Directorate conducts entrance test including MH-CET, the state entrance test for admission in technical institute degree courses, including Diploma courses for Bachelor of Architecture and Bachelor of Hotel Management and catering technology.

== Objective ==
The Directorate is to maintain and enhance the quality of technical education by defining policies, developing government institutions, supervising private institutions, interacting with industry and national level institutions, coordinating with other state and national departments and organizations and to contribute to the development of industry society at large.

- Efficiently and effectively manage the Technical Education System, ensuring transparency and integrity.
- Develop Technical manpower to meet the needs of the economy.
- Elevate research levels in Technical Education system.

== Enrollment ==
The Directorate conducts admission tests to manage enrollment of tens of thousands of engineering students across the state. After the fourth round of counseling during the academic year 2016-2017 more than 51,000 seats were vacant.

The Directorate of Technical education obtained permission from the Maharashtra government for another round testing, but not enough qualified candidates emerged.
