= Dhanwate National College, Nagpur =

Higher-educational institution in Nagpur, India

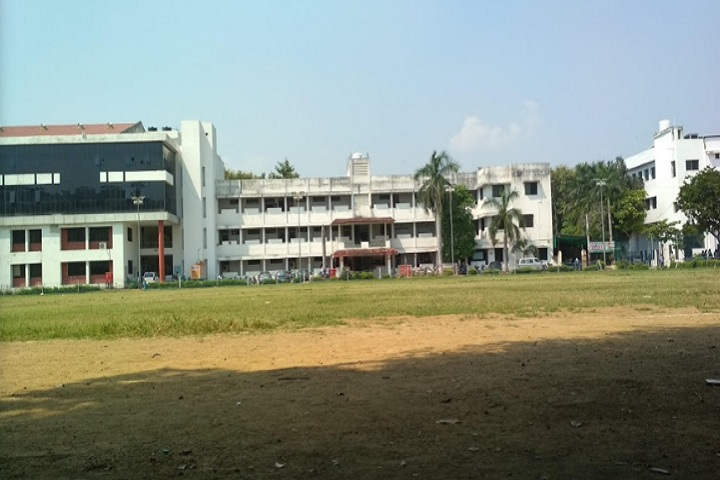
- Campus View of Dhanwate National College, Nagpur
- Type: Private
- Established: 1935 (91 years ago)
- Accreditation: NAAC Re-Accredited 'B' Grade, CGPA 2.53
- Affiliations: Rashtrasant Tukadoji Maharaj Nagpur University
- Principal: Dr. Jayant D. Wadate
- Academic staff: 31
- Students: 3445
- Location: Congress Nagar, Nagpur, Maharashtra, 440012, India
- Campus: 6 acres (2.4 ha); Urban
- Nickname: DNC college
- Website: www.dhanwatenationalcollege.com

Dhanwate National College, Nagpur established in 1935, is one of the oldest general degree college in Nagpur, Maharashtra, India. This college offers different courses in arts and commerce. It is affiliated to Rashtrasant Tukadoji Maharaj Nagpur University.

== Departments ==
- Marathi
- English
- Hindi
- History
- Political Science
- Economics
- Sanskrit
- Sociology
- Geography
- Philosophy
- Physical Education
- Computer Science
- Management
- Commerce

== Accreditation ==
The college is recognized by the University Grants Commission (UGC).
