= St. Vincent Pallotti College of Engineering and Technology =

St. Vincent Pallotti College of Engineering and Technology, Nagpur
- Other names: Pallotti College
- Motto: Arise and Shine
- Type: Autonomous
- Established: 2004
- Affiliations: RTMNU, NAAC & NBA
- Chairman: Fr. Dr. Joy Palachuvattil SAC
- Chancellor: Governor of Maharashtra
- Principal: Dr. Vijay M. Wadhai
- Director: Fr. Dr. Paul Chandrankunnel
- Undergraduates: Yes
- Postgraduates: Yes
- Doctoral students: Yes
- Location: Nagpur, Maharashtra, India; 21.0047°N 79.0476°E
- Campus: Urban
- Website: www.stvincentngp.edu.in

St. Vincent Pallotti College of Engineering and Technology (SVPCET) is an engineering college located at Gavsi Manapur, Wardha road, Nagpur, Maharashtra, India. It has been founded in 2004 by The Nagpur Pallottine Society. When the college started, it was affiliated to Rashtrasant Tukadoji Maharaj Nagpur University (RTMNU). The University Grants Commission (UGC) conferred autonomous status on St. Vincent Pallotti College of Engineering & Technology on 7 September 2021. In 2019, it was given grade "A" by the National Assessment and Accreditation Council (NAAC).
