= Jita, Nepal =

Jita, Nepal जिता
- Municipality, Madhyanepal Municipality
- Location in Nepal Jita, Nepal (Nepal)
- Coordinates: 28.13°N 84.31°E
- Country: Nepal
- Zone: Gandaki Zone
- District: Lamjung District

Population (1991)
  - Total: 2,906
- Time zone: UTC+5:45 (Nepal Time)

Jita, Nepal is a village development committee in Lamjung District in the Gandaki Zone of northern-central Nepal. At the time of the 1991 Nepal census it had a population of 2906 people living in 585 individual households.
