= Indian Institute of Fire Engineering, Nagpur =

Indian Institute of Fire Engineering (IIFE)
- Motto: TRAIN TO SAVE
- Type: Government Approved Technical Institute
- Undergraduates: 150
- Location: Nagpur, Maharashtra, India; 21.175437°N 79.032563°E
- Campus: Metropolitan
- Website: Indian Institute of Fire Engineering

Indian Institute of Fire Engineering, Nagpur (IIFE) is the first Government of Maharashtra recognized institute in India for advanced courses in fire safety engineering and security management studies.

IIFE is registered under the Government Society Act 1860 (Regd. No. MAH-365/97) and is recognised by Maharashtra State Board of Technical Education (MSBTE) and Director of Technical Education (DT Board), Mumbai.

IIFE is located on five acres of land at Makardhokda, near Friends Colony on Nagpur Katol highway, Nagpur City Nagpur.

== Courses ==
The following MSBTE recognised diploma courses are conducted at IIFE, Nagpur.

- Diploma in Fire Service Engineering (FR)
- Advance Diploma in Fire Safety Engineering (FS)
- Advance Diploma in Industrial Safety (IT)
- Post Diploma in Fire Engineering (FI)
- Advance Diploma in Fire and Security Management (FU)
- Advance Diploma in Industrial Safety and Security Management (FF)
