= Maharashtra Health and Technical Common Entrance Test =

Indian state entrance exam

- Acronym: MHT-CET
- Type: Electronic assessment
- Administrator: CET Cell
- Skills tested: Physics, Chemistry, and Mathematics or Physics, Chemistry and Biology
- Purpose: Admission to undergraduate engineering, agriculture and pharmacy courses in the state of Maharashtra.
- Duration: 3 hours
- Score range: 0 to 200
- Offered: Twice a year
- Regions: India
- Languages: English, Marathi
- Annual number of test takers: 16,29,484
- Prerequisites: Class 12 or equivalent with Mathematics, Physics and any one of the technical subjects prescribed by AICTE from recognised board/university.
- Website: cetcell.mahacet.org

The MHT-CET or Common Entrance Test is an multiple-choice annual entrance exam conducted by the Government of Maharashtra. MHT-CET is given by students after completing standard 12th or a diploma. MHT-CET is conducted by the Directorate of Technical Education. The Entrance exam is given by students seeking to study Engineering, Pharmacy, and Agricultural courses in colleges of Maharashtra. The test was conducted in online mode for the first time in 2019 and continues to be a Computer Based Test (CBT).

== Syllabus ==
MHT-CET syllabus consists of three subjects: Physics, Chemistry, Maths or Biology for Pharmacy. MHT-CET entrance exam has 150 questions from PCM and 200 questions for PCB while the total marks is 200 marks. The subject-wise number of questions is different based on the stream. Each question answered correctly is worth a single mark in Physics, [|Biology], Chemistry, but in Maths each questions answered correctly is graded as 2 marks; making Maths an important subject in the whole syllabus. The questions are asked from the state-approved HSC textbook of standard 11th and 12th. The syllabus weightage is 80% from standard 12th, and 20% from standard 11th.

== The Admission Process ==
The Admission process starts after the entrance exam. There is a gap of 2 months before the admission process gets started. The whole process is conducted online through Centralized Admission Process (CAP) via the official website. There are four CAP rounds and each round lasts for a week. To get admission to a college through Centralized Admission Process (CAP) in popular fields like Computer science and Information technology, students usually need above 70 percentile. Linguistic and Religious minority students are given concession, to make it easier for them to study further, to apply for concessions, The applicant needs to submit and verify all the valid documentation before or after the entrance exam.

== The Supreme Court Verdict ==
Earlier, The Maharashtra Heath and Technical Common Entrance Test was also used to admit students into medical colleges in Maharashtra. After the Supreme Court of India insisted that only NEET can be used for undergraduate medicine admissions all over India, MHT-CET has been scrapped for medical colleges and is no longer used for admission in Medical Colleges in Maharashtra.

== Sources ==
- https://www.mahacet.org/cetcell/wp-content/uploads/2019/01/Draft-Copy-of-MHT-CET-2019-Information-Brochure-for-Engg_Tech_Pharmacy_Pharm.D..pdf MHT-CET 2020 Brochure
