= Jitu Soni =

Tanzanian politician (born 1969)

Honourable Jitu Soni MP
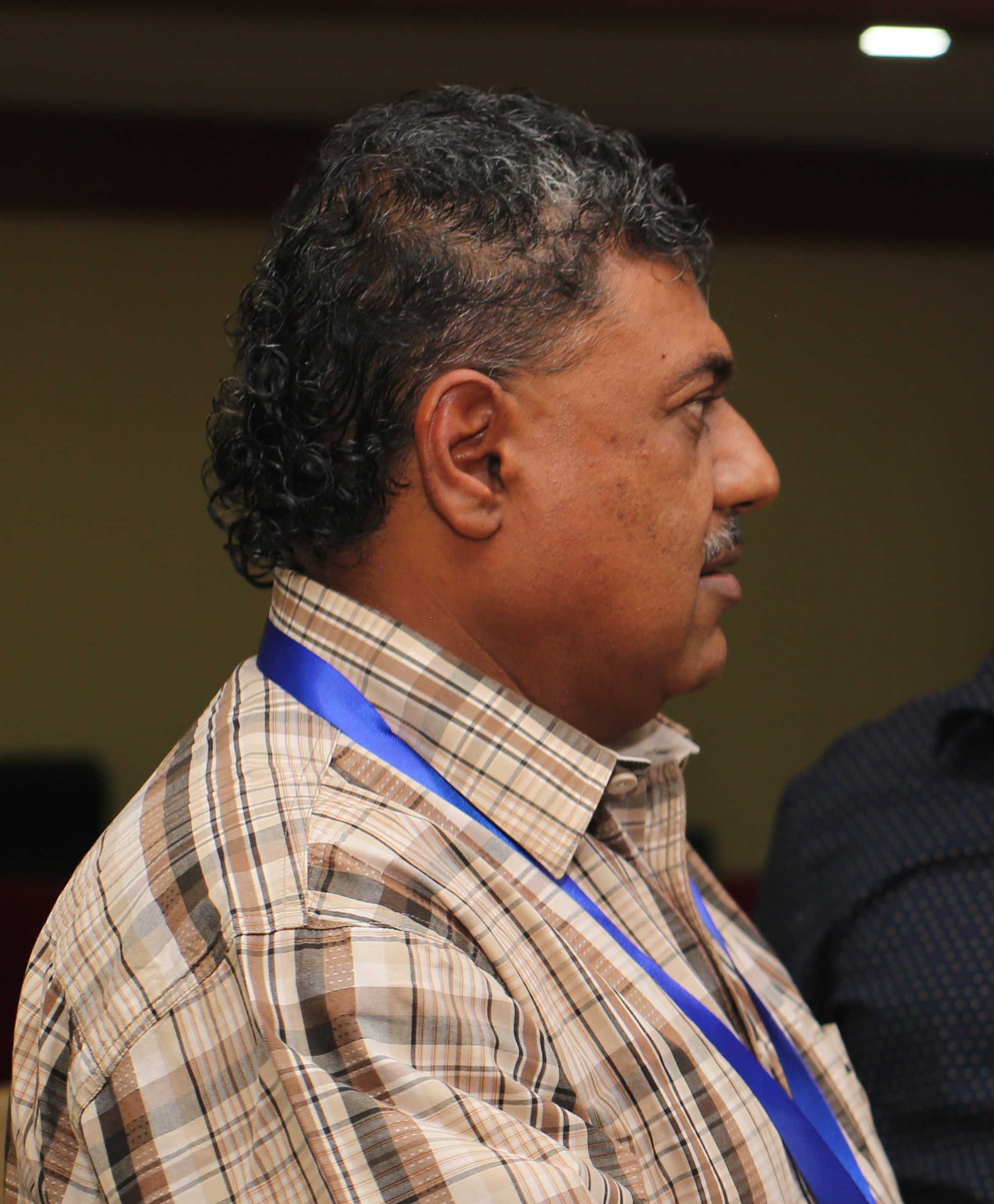

Member of Parliament for Babati Rural
- Incumbent
- Assumed office November 2010

Personal details
- Born: 2 July 1969 (age 56)
- Party: CCM

Jitu Soni (born 2 July 1969) is a Tanzanian CCM politician and Member of Parliament for Babati Rural constituency since 2010.
