= Jhulelal Institute of Technology =

Jhulelal Institute of Technology, Nagpur
- Motto: Creating a breed of thorough professionals is our forte!
- Type: Public (Engineering and Management College)
- Established: 2008
- Academic affiliations: Nagpur University, Samridhi Sarwajanik Charitable Trust (SSCT)
- Location: Nagpur, Maharashtra, India; 21.2475°N 79.0508°E
- Campus: Urban
- Colors: Navy blue
- Website: www.jit.org.in

Jhulelal Institute of Technology (JIT) is an engineering and management college established in 2008 is named after the community God of Sindhi people-Jhulelal (Sindhi/Urdu: جهوللال), (Sanskrit: झूलेलाल) or Dariyalal.

The institute is affiliated with the Rashtrasant Tukadoji Maharaj Nagpur University and approved by the All India Council for Technical Education (AICTE), as an autonomous institute.

JIT offers undergraduate and postgraduate programs in various engineering disciplines such as computer science, electronics and telecommunication, mechanical engineering, civil engineering, and electrical engineering. The institute also offers a master's degree in business administration (MBA) and a diploma in mechanical engineering.

== Campus ==
JIT campus is 5.5 km (3.4 mi) from Koradi Naka. The campus is divided into two buildings. The academic area chiefly comprises the main building and another building where the auditorium is located.

The institute has basketball, volleyball, and badminton courts. It also has an indoor games facility for students, where they play table tennis, carrom, chess, and cards.

- Campus area: 20 acres (8.1 ha)
- Location

12.1 km (7.5 mi) from zero mile, Nagpur
12.7 km (7.9 mi) from Nagpur Railway Station
20.4 km (12.7 mi) from Dr. Babasaheb Ambedkar International Airport, Nagpur

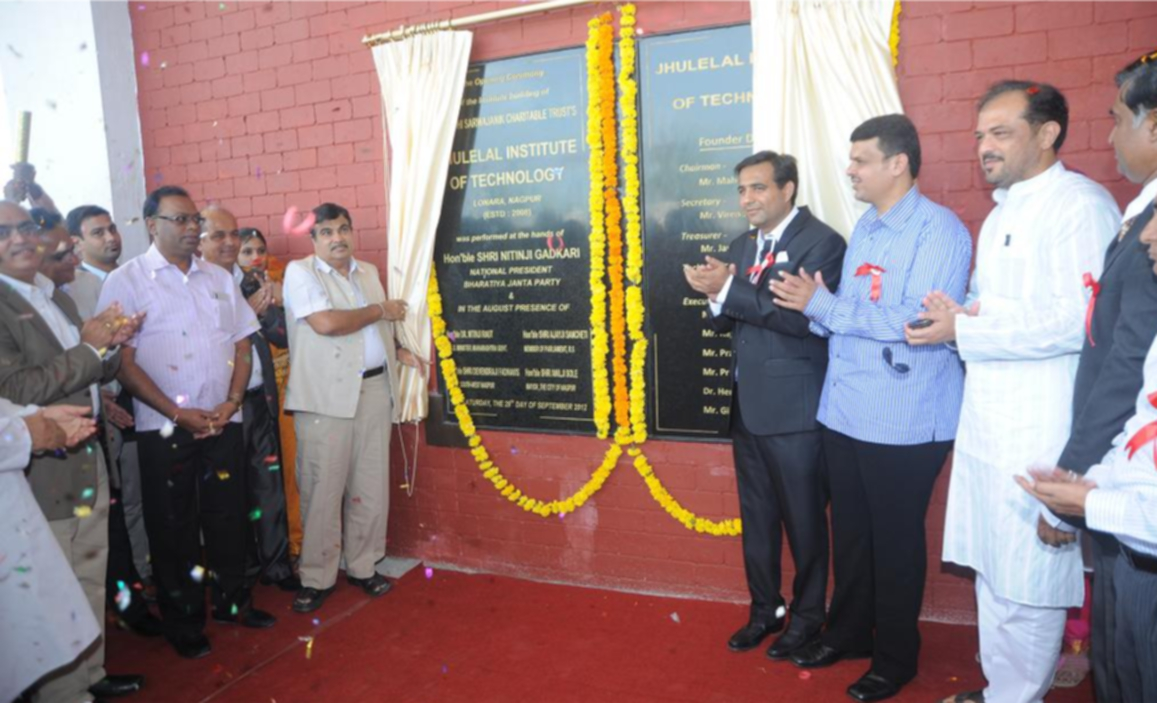
Hon'ble Shri Nitinji Gadkari (center) inaugurating college building. From right: Pramod Pampatwar, Anil Sole, Devendra Fadnavis, Sunil Kedar, Virendra Kukreja, Chandrashekhar Bawankhule, Mahesh Sadhwani

=== Inauguration of the college building ===
On 29 September 2012, the JIT college building was inaugurated with the hands of BJP National President Nitinji Gadkari. MLA Vikas Kumbhare, NMC Standing Committee Chairman Dayashankar Tiwari, MLA Vijay Ghodmare, MLA Chandrashekhar Bawankhule, Devendra Fadnavis, Sunil Kedar, and Mayor Anil Sole were also present as guests.

JIT Campus at a Glance
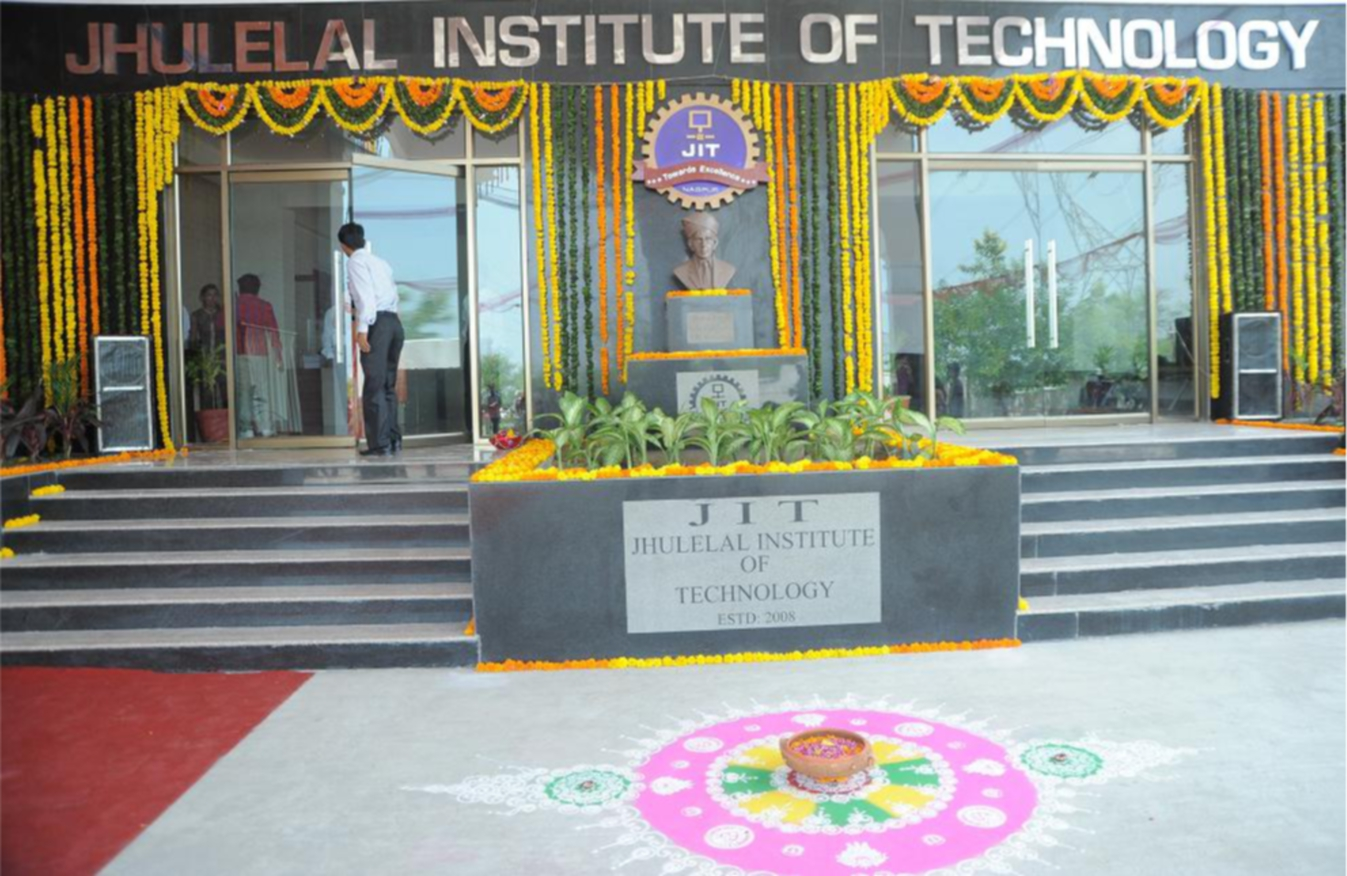
Visvesvaraya Statue

== Academics ==
The institute offers Bachelor of Engineering (BE) courses in various disciplines, with a total intake of 390 students per annum in the first year and 78 in the second. The institute also offers a Master of Business Administration (MBA) course with 60 seats per annum.

== Cultural and non-academic activities ==
=== Technical activities ===
==== Shikhar technology festival ====
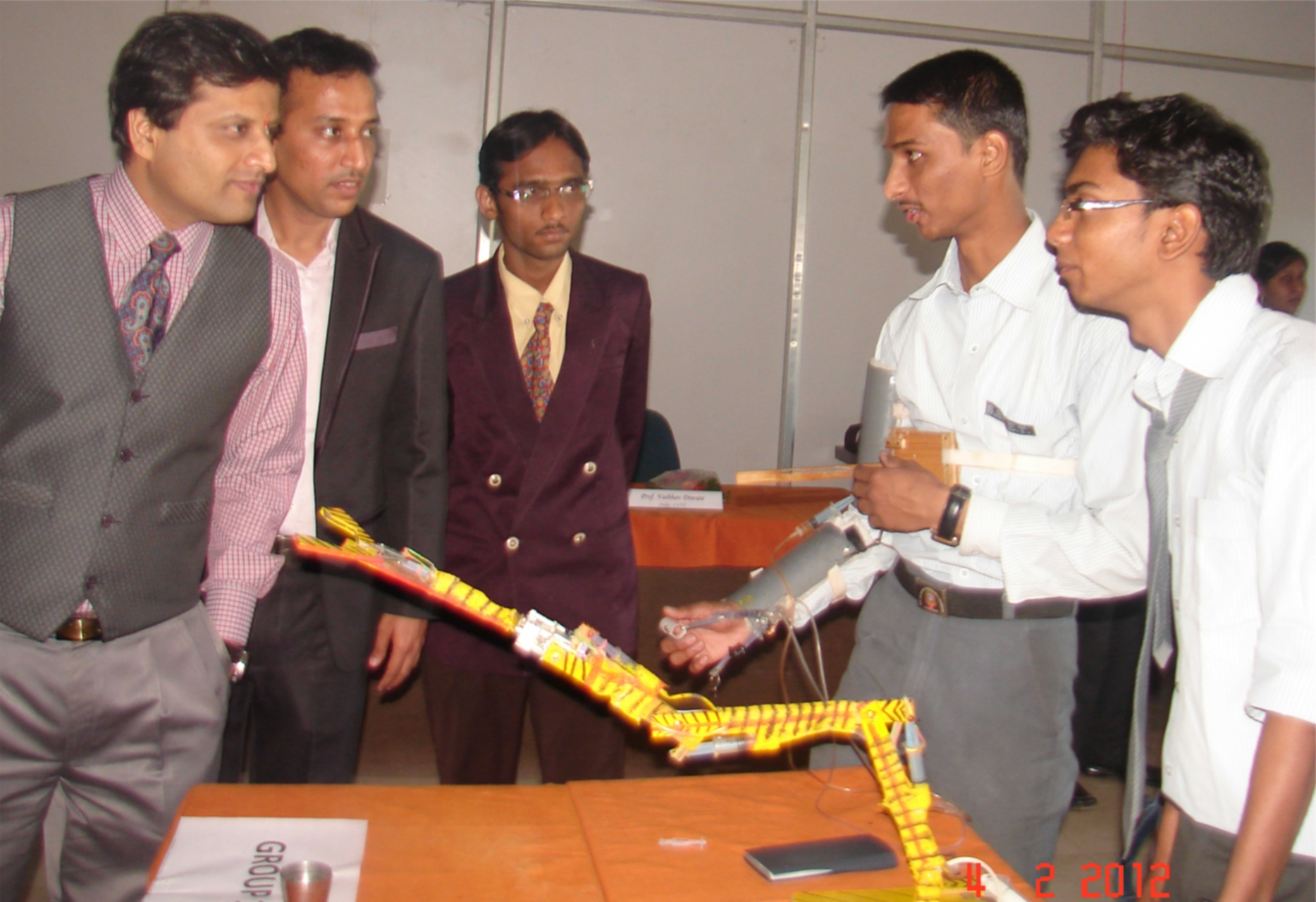
Robotic arm demo - Shikhar 2012. From left: Dr. Harold D’Costa, (Cyber Crime, India), Prof. R.M. Ingle (JIT) and participants

A national level tech-fest, "Shikhar", is conducted every year. Thousands of students from engineering and management colleges across India participate. It is organized at the JIT campus under the aegis of ISTE, JIT Students Chapter. Around 1000 students from 36 engineering colleges from Pune and Tamil Nadu, and Andhra Pradesh Universities along with students from Chandrapur, Wardha, Gondia and Yavatmal districts engineering colleges participate. It is a technical event with various competitions like C-coding, web design, project exhibition, Robo-Race, Line Follower, Wall Follower, and LAN gaming are held.

A total of 179 technical papers were presented by students in parallel sessions. Projects were also displayed. Participants from various branches such as electronics, electrical, computer science, IT, mechanical, civil, and MBA participated. Around 200 students along with their robots took part.

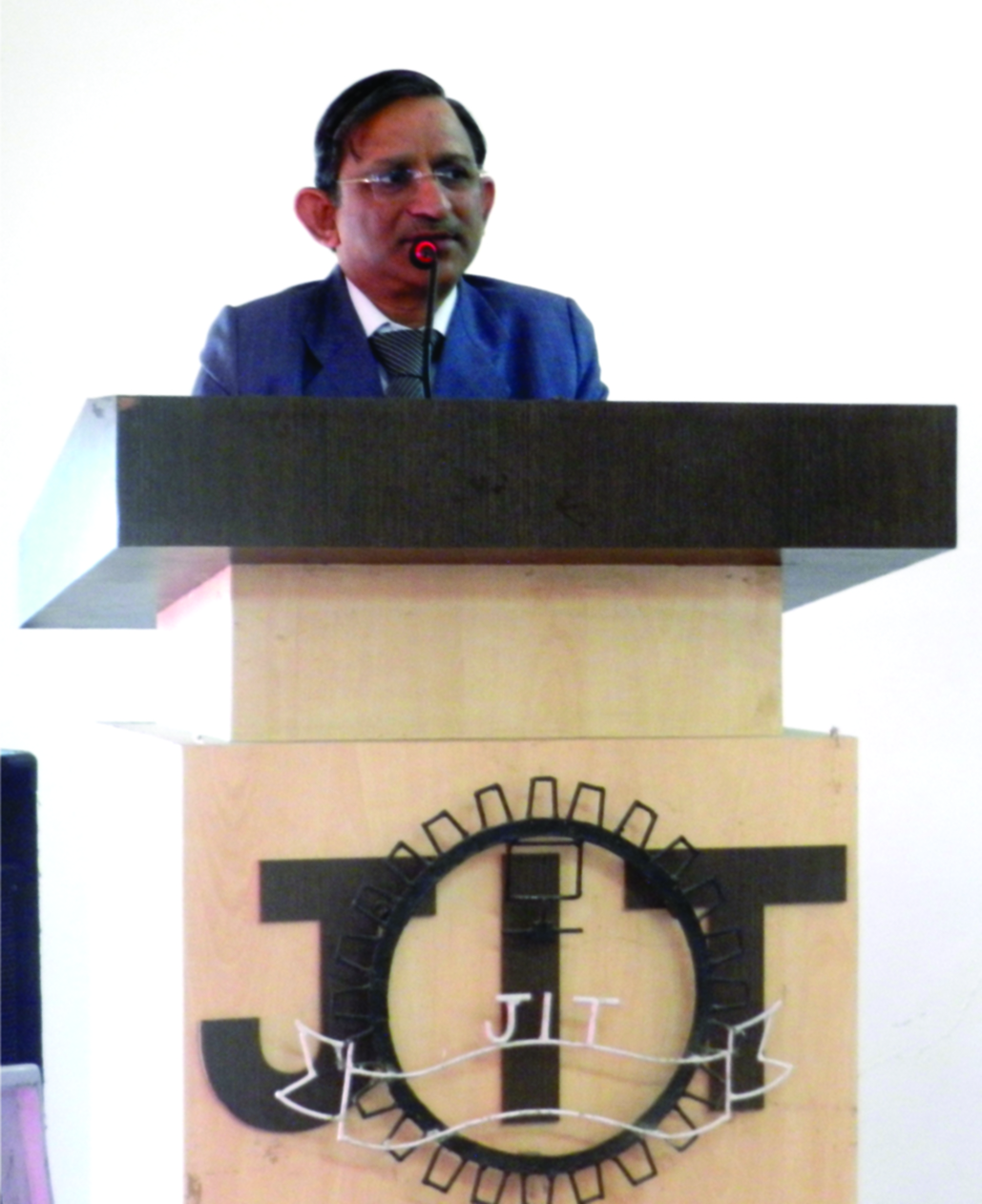
Dr. Vilas Sapkal, Vice Chancellor of Rashtrasant Tukdoji Maharaj Nagpur University, addressing during WAD-DIP 2012

==== Workshop on Aptitude Development (WAD) ====
The workshop consists of technical sessions by experts along with interactive and participative sessions for the students on various topics including: 1. Analytical ability 2. English Language 3. Aptitude building 4. Group discussion techniques 5. Public speaking 6. Personal interview techniques 7. Logical thinking and reasoning

A principals' discussion panel on "Personality Development in Technical Education" was organized in WAD, emphasizing the importance of being focused. Students were given valuable input and were evaluated for their performance in social skills by eminent panelists during WAD.

In 2012, Mr. Anil Malviya, a senate member, of RTMNU was the guest of honor of the function. WAD-DIP Dr. Vilas Sapkal, Vice Chancellor of Rashtrasant Tukdoji Maharaj Nagpur University (RTMNU) addressed career opportunities and students' options after graduation. He also talked about the new developments in Nagpur University which will benefit the students. He answered queries regarding the syllabus, fee structure, and time taken for services provided by the university.

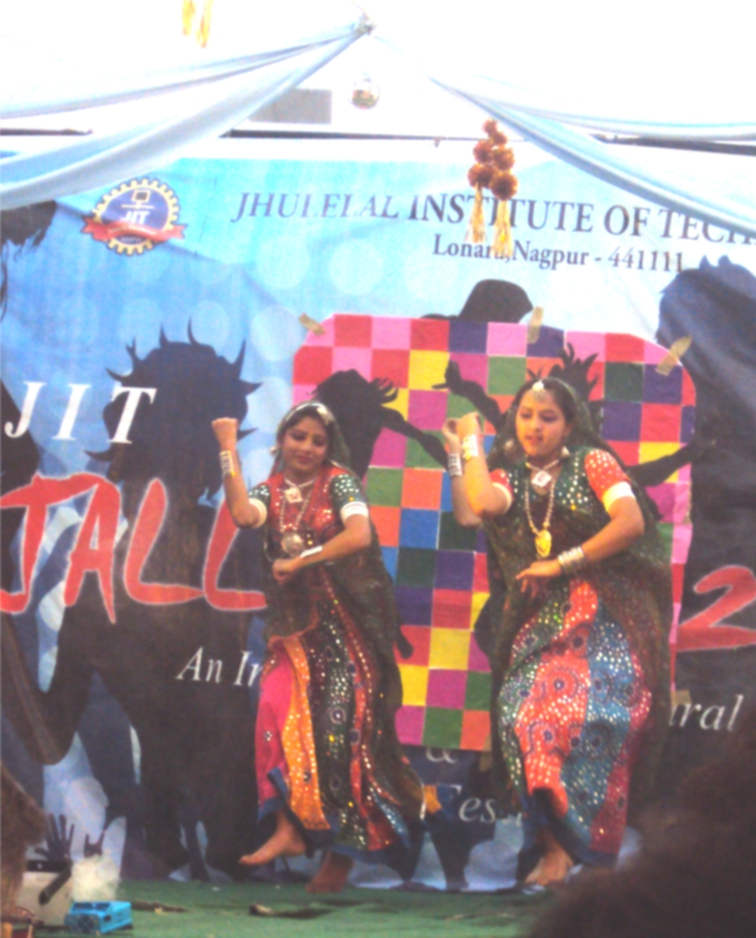
Gujarati Dance Performance in JIT-Jallosh 2012.

==== Jallosh culture festival ====
JIT-Jallosh is an annual culture festival organized every year by the college. Cultural activities like singing, dancing, rangoli, art, quiz, debate, and personality also mark an important feature in the life of a student. Singing and dancing have always been very popular with JIT students. JITians actively participate in quiz and debate activities.

JIT-Jallosh includes events like "BRAIN BOX" (a general quiz competition) and the RUPAK singing competition. The next event was ICON, a student personality competition for the male and female icons of JIT. WORD WAR is a debate competition, followed by Sur-Sangram-antakshari. JIT-JALLOSH ended with the THIRKAN dance competition.

==== Mythbusters - Talent and Beyond ====
This was a five-day mega youth event organized by JIT students (Anurag Deshpande, Anup N Nair, Nikhil Vanjani, Esha Ghosh, Sanket S Parma, Shashwath Kamath, and Abhijeet Shiwankar). Around 800 students from about 60 colleges in and around Nagpur participated in this event. The event took place at various locations around Nagpur. The event tested the students on various aspects such as team-building, and social, mental, and physical skills.

=== Social activities ===
==== National Service Scheme ====
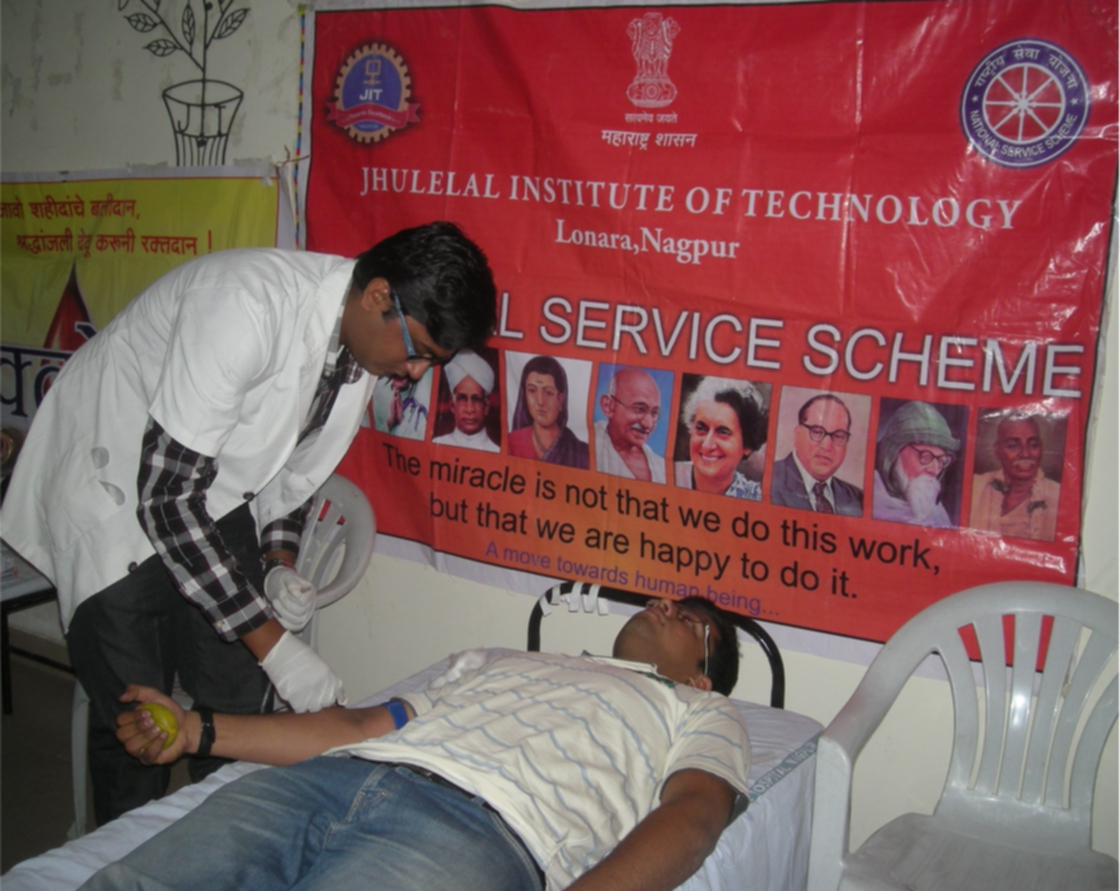
NSS activity - blood donation camp at JIT

The National Service Scheme (NSS), under the Ministry of Youth Affairs and Sports Government of India, was launched in Gandhiji's centenary birth year of 1969, in 37 universities involving 40,000 students with a primary focus on the development of students' personality through community service.

JIT has a very active NSS unit. This helps the students to grow as responsible citizens and also enjoy the pleasure of giving.

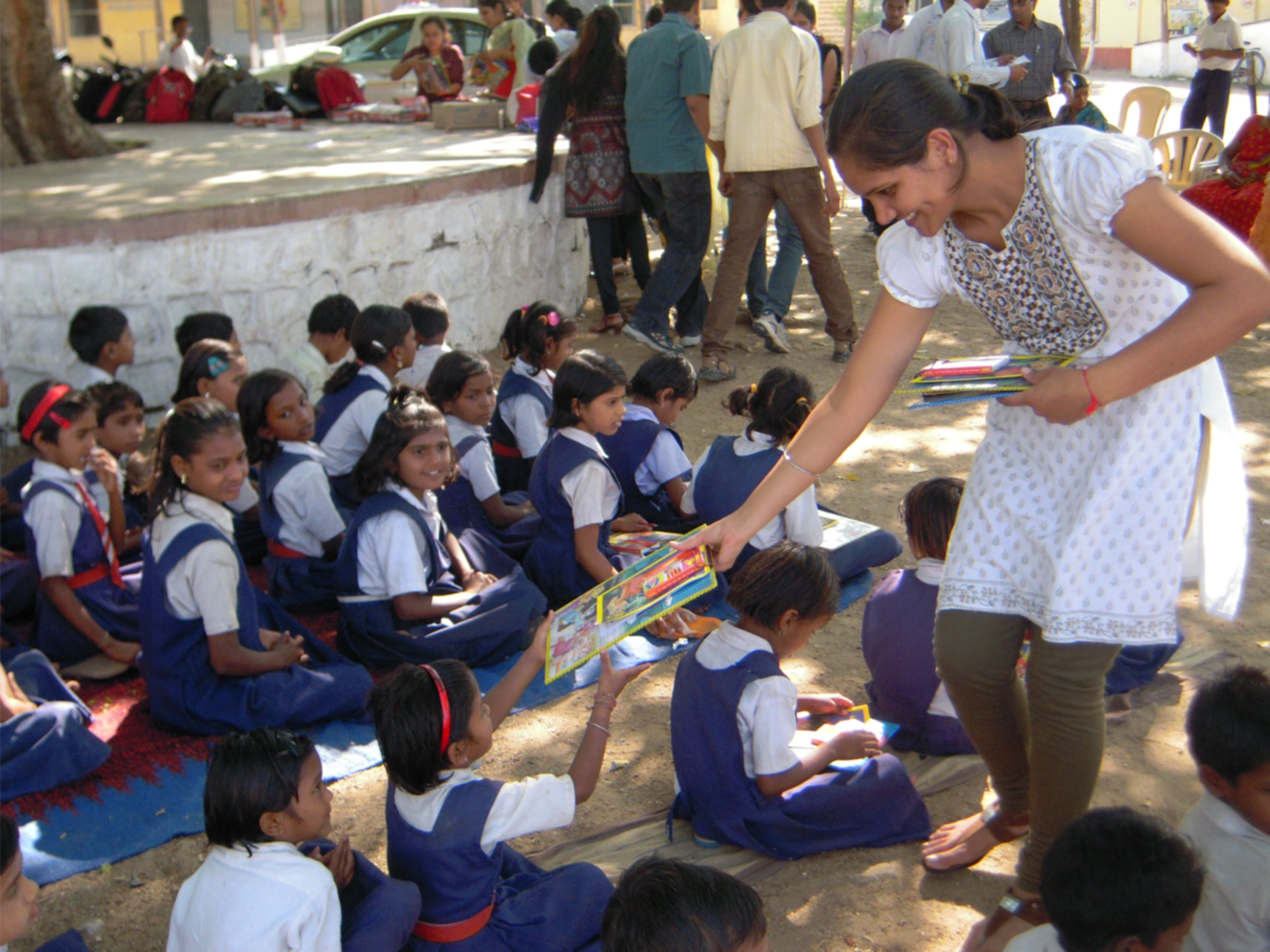
NSS activity - stationery distribution at Central Higher Primary School, Ghumtada, Nagpur by JIT.

Activities taken by National Service Scheme:

- Blood donation camp for students and staff
- Stationary distribution to Prathamik Shala children in Lonara village
- Old garment distribution to poor and needy people in Lonara and Gumthala villages
- Polio awareness program
- Nail cutter distribution and health check-up camp in villages
- Awareness of healthy habits / gram Swachchhata Abhiyan at Lonara or Gumtala
- Annadan donation program at deaf and dumb/disabled children school in Saoner
- Fruit distribution program in old age home on Hingna Road
- Ganeshotsav celebration at JIT
- Tree planting programme

==== Rotaract Club ====
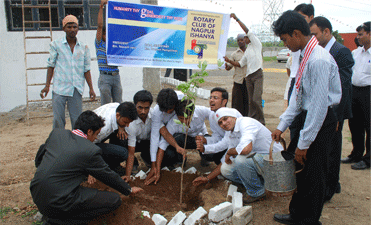
Rotaract activity - tree planting event by Rotaract Club of Nagpur, JIT

An installation ceremony of the Rotaract Club of Nagpur took place in JIT on 15 August 2009 by the hands of Shri Sanjay Meshram, the chief guest of the function. The Rotaract Club comes under Rotary Club, Nagpur, Ishanya. Shri Kamal Taori, Director of Youth Services; Rtn Naresh Jain, President Nagpur – Ishanya; Shri. Pramod Pampatwar, Secretary of Rotary Club, Nagpur; Shri Mahesh Sadhwani, Chairman SSCT; Dr. S.V. Gole, Vice-principal JIT; Shri Virendra Kukreja, and Secretary SSCT graced the function with their presence. The installation was followed by tree planting.

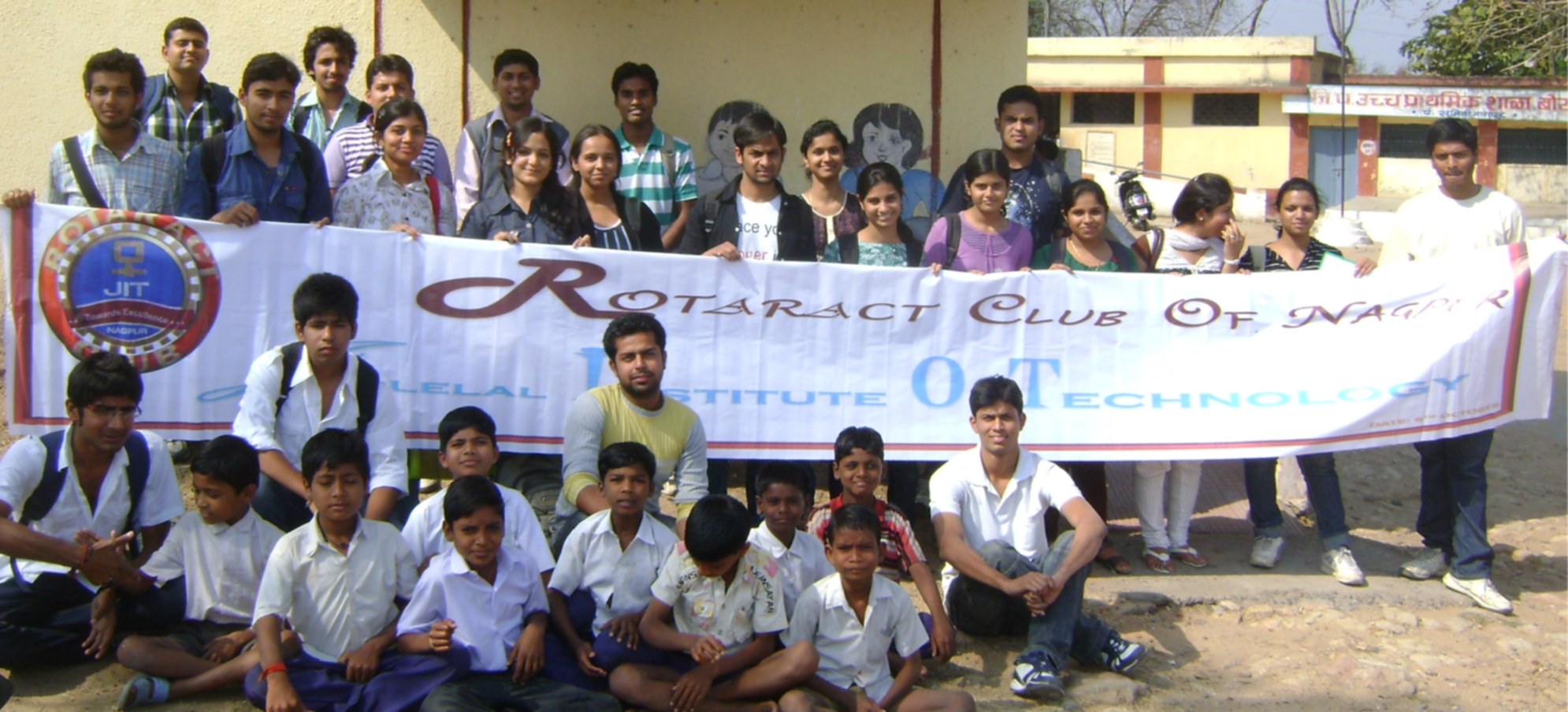
Rotaract activity - JIT organized teaching campaign at Bokara, Nagpur. Members of JIT Rotaract Club and village students.

In Rotaract Club, students were taught about personality development, time management, and leadership skills.

=== Student Association ===
==== Zeal - department electronics and telecommunications ====
A state-level mini project competition "Rhapsodize" was organized at JIT on 1 March 2011 by CS/IT and ETC departments under the forum Encyphrist and Zeal. Students from various colleges participated in the events. The event was held in the computer center of the college. Prizes were distributed.

== Sports ==
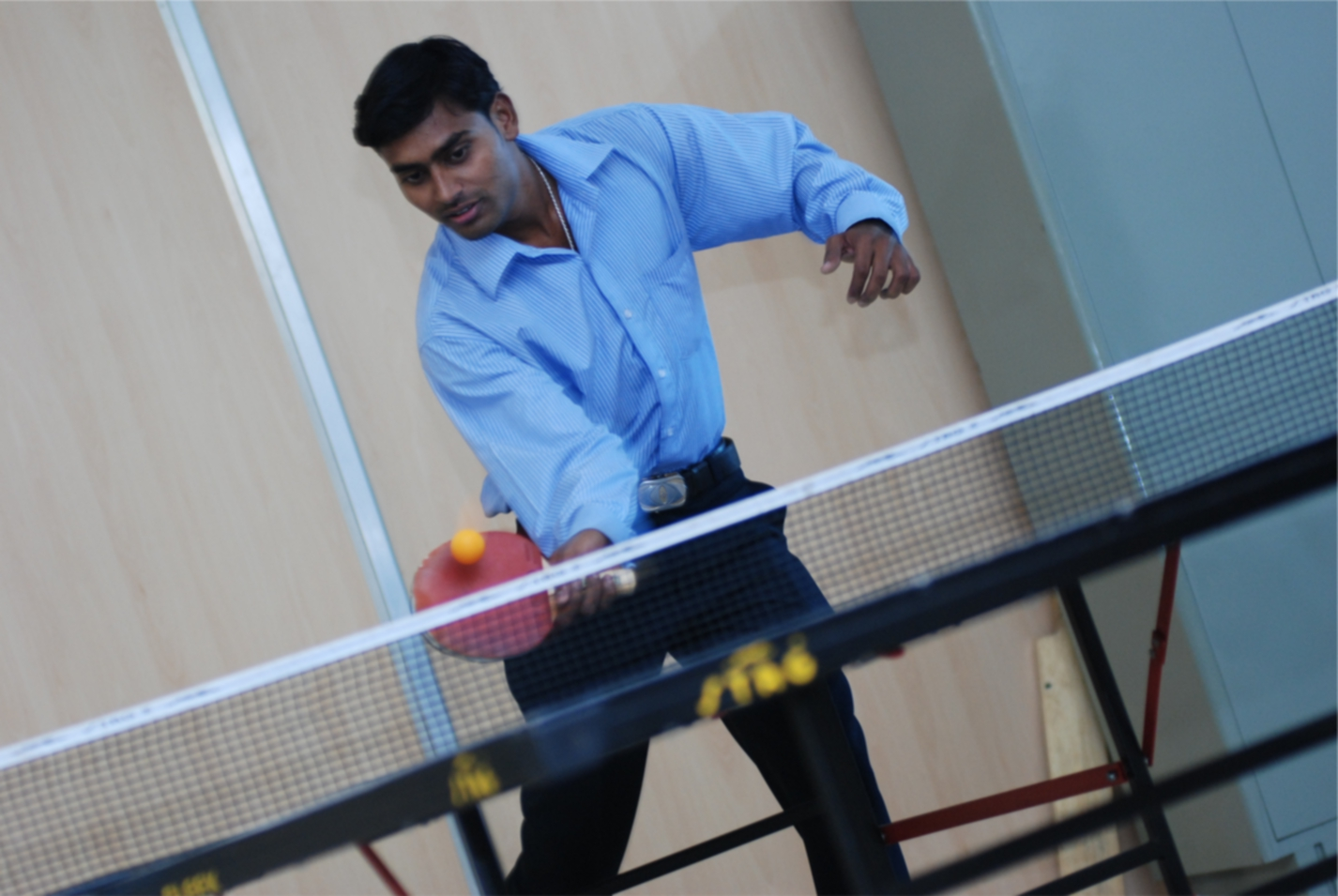
Shalab Shrivastav, JIT athlete, playing table tennis

=== Department of Physical Education ===
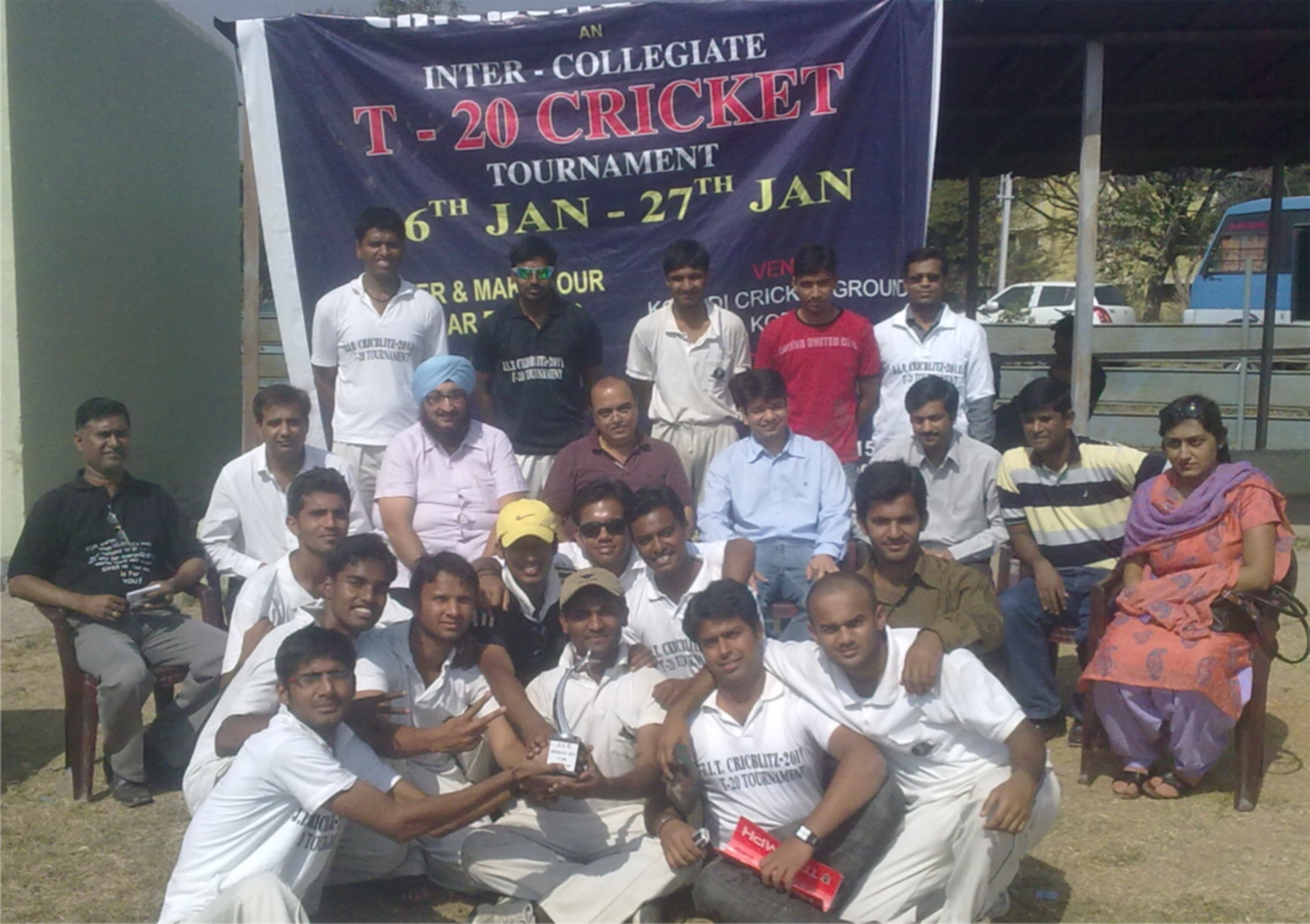
JIT wins T-20 cricket tournament in 2010. From left: Pramod Pampatwar, Virendra Kukreja, Mr. Tuli, Mahesh Sadhwani, Madhvi Wairagade and students

As per the university calendar, the teams for various events are selected through inter-section intra mural jallosh cup matches. Games in which Jitians participated at the university level are as follows:

- Chess (men)
- Chess (women)
- Basketball (men)
- Basketball (women)
- Volleyball (men)
- Volleyball (women)
- Badminton (men)
- Badminton (women)
- Cricket (men)
- Softball
- Korfball
- Table tennis (men)
- Table tennis (women)
- Athletics

== See also ==
- List of universities in India
- Universities and colleges in India
- Education in India
- Distance Education Council
- University Grants Commission (India)
