= G.S. College of Commerce and Economics, Nagpur =

Higher-educational institution in Nagpur, India

G.S. College of Commerce and Economics (Autonomous)
- जी. एस. वाणिज्य आणि अर्थशास्त्र महाविद्यालय
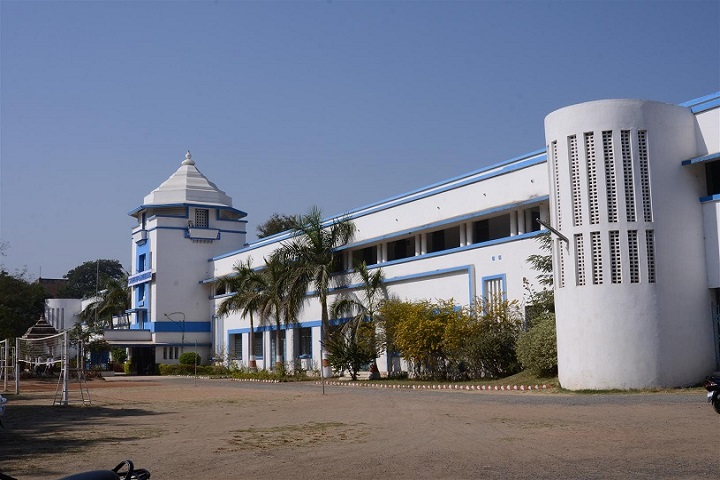
- Campus view of G.S. College of Commerce and Economics, Nagpur
- Motto: “Udyoginam Purushsinham Urpeti Laxmi” i.e. Industrious and Lion-hearted Men Generate Wealth”
- Type: Public (Autonomous)
- Established: 1945
- Founder: Shiksha Mandal
- Affiliations: Rashtrasant Tukadoji Maharaj Nagpur University
- Principal: Dr. Praveen Mustoor
- Academic staff: 100+
- Students: 4000+
- Undergraduates: B.Com., B.Com. (Computer Applications), B.Com. Finance & Accountancy with ACCA London (UK), B.Com. Business Administration
- Postgraduates: M.Com., MBA
- Location: Civil Lines, Amravati Road, Nagpur, Maharashtra 440001, India
- Campus: Urban, 6 acres (2.4 ha)
- Language: English, Marathi, Hindi
- Website: gscen.shikshamandal.org

G.S. College of Commerce and Economics, Nagpur (Autonomous), established in 1945, is the first Commerce College in the city of Nagpur and only the second in Nagpur University. It was established by the prestigious Shiksha Mandal Educational Trust and named after cotton tycoon Govindram Seksaria who donated a large parcel of land at Law College Square for the college.

The establishment of the college reflected the broader vision of the Indian nationalist movement, which strongly emphasised indigenous education and institution-building during the last years of British colonial rule.

== History ==
G.S. College of Commerce and Economics, Nagpur, was established in 1945 by Shiksha Mandal, Wardha, to meet the growing demand for commerce education in Central India. Founded during the final years of British rule, the institution reflected the growing emphasis on professional education and the development of Indian business and industry.

Professor M. R. Tokhi was the college’s Founding Principal, as identified in the institution’s 2019–20 prospectus. He led the college from its establishment until his retirement in 1975. [16]

Tokhi had been teaching in Wardha when, in 1942, he came into contact with Mahatma Gandhi at the Sewagram Ashram and became a follower of Gandhian ideals. He subsequently came to Nagpur at the initiative of Kamal Nayan Bajaj to explore the establishment of a commerce college in the city.

The college initially operated from a small bungalow in Dharampeth Extension. Its subsequent development was supported by a donation of land at Law College Square by industrialist and philanthropist Govindram Seksaria, enabling the institution to establish a permanent campus.

Under Tokhi’s leadership, the college developed into a prominent centre for commerce education in Central India, preparing generations of students for careers in business, finance, industry and public service.

=== Early Years ===
In 1945, the college initially focused on the Bachelor of Commerce (B.Com) program, covering Accounting, Economics, Corporate Law, and Business Management. It emphasised industry-aligned curriculum design to ensure graduates were equipped with the skills to excel in business. This initiative responded to the urgent need for career-oriented education in India before and after Independence and reflected the transformation of the late-colonial education system into a national service-oriented one.

=== 1970s–1990s ===
G.S. College of Commerce and Economics has emerged as the premier business education institution in Central India. The college has added Postgraduate Degree-M.com programs in Finance, Banking, and Taxation. During this period, the Indian economy was undergoing a transformation from state regulation to market opening, and the curriculum structure of colleges and universities was also adjusted accordingly to enhance students' employment competitiveness in the "mixed economy" environment.

=== 2000 – present ===
To meet the demands of globalisation and the rise of digital transformation in education, the College has gradually introduced courses in emerging areas such as computer applications, financial management and e-commerce. E-learning resources, smart classrooms and digital libraries have also been introduced to enhance the learning experience. This is in line with the Outcome Based Education (OBE) model promoted by the All India Council for Technical Education (AICTE).

== Campus and Facilities ==
The campus of G.S. College of Commerce and Economics is located in the heart of Nagpur on approximately 6 acres of land. The style is an example of the ingenious fusion of colonial-era institutional architecture with modern academic infrastructure, marked by high arches, airy galleries and red-brick facades, reflecting the mid-20th century design philosophy of Indian educational architecture that emphasised "rational order" and "functional aesthetics". Such buildings are not only of historical value but have also been designed to adapt to the climatic conditions of tropical cities such as Nagpur, creating a stable and comfortable learning space for students. A growing body of research has demonstrated that the built environment within educational settings significantly influences student engagement, satisfaction, and learning outcomes, especially in higher education institutions focused on business and commerce.

=== Library ===
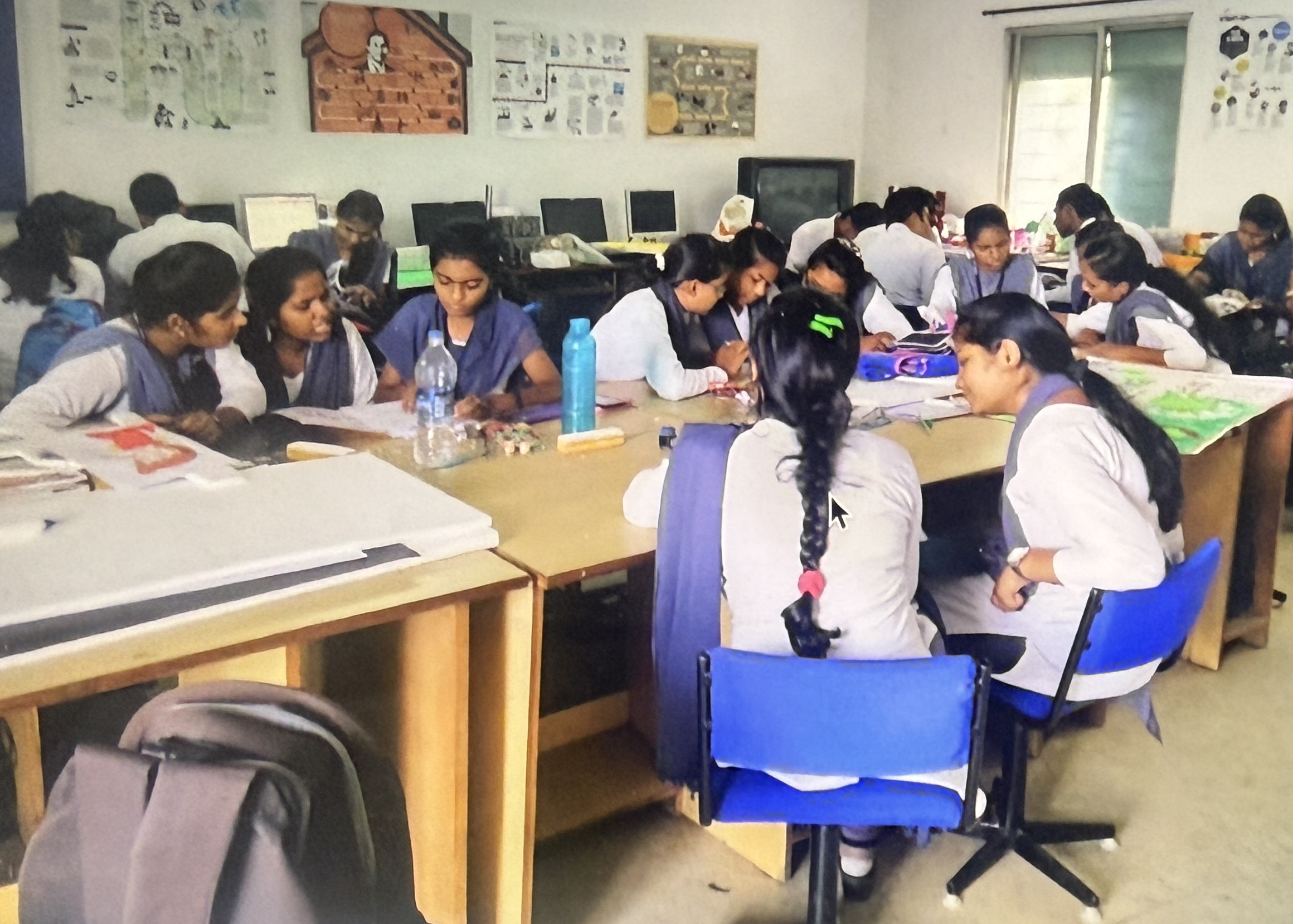
Classroom Nagpur

The library at G.S. College of Commerce and Economics (GSCCE), Nagpur, serves as a vital academic resource centre catering to students, faculty, and researchers. GSCCE is one of the most significant Business and Economics libraries in Central India, with a collection of more than 50,000 volumes covering a large number of journals and research papers related to business, economic management and other rare journals and research papers supporting the institution's programs in Business, Commerce and Economics. In addition, G.S. College of Commerce and Economics runs an online digital library that provides access to e-books, online journals and databases (including JSTOR, ProQuest, NDLI, etc.). This digital resource allows students to access materials remotely in any situation, giving convenience to those working on research projects outside of regular class hours. The increasing integration of digital resources into library services reflects a national trend, with the All-India Higher Education Survey noting that libraries with hybrid access models have higher student use and satisfaction levels.

Apart from academics, the campus offers sports facilities, cultural clubs and student societies.

=== Nitin Gadkari ===
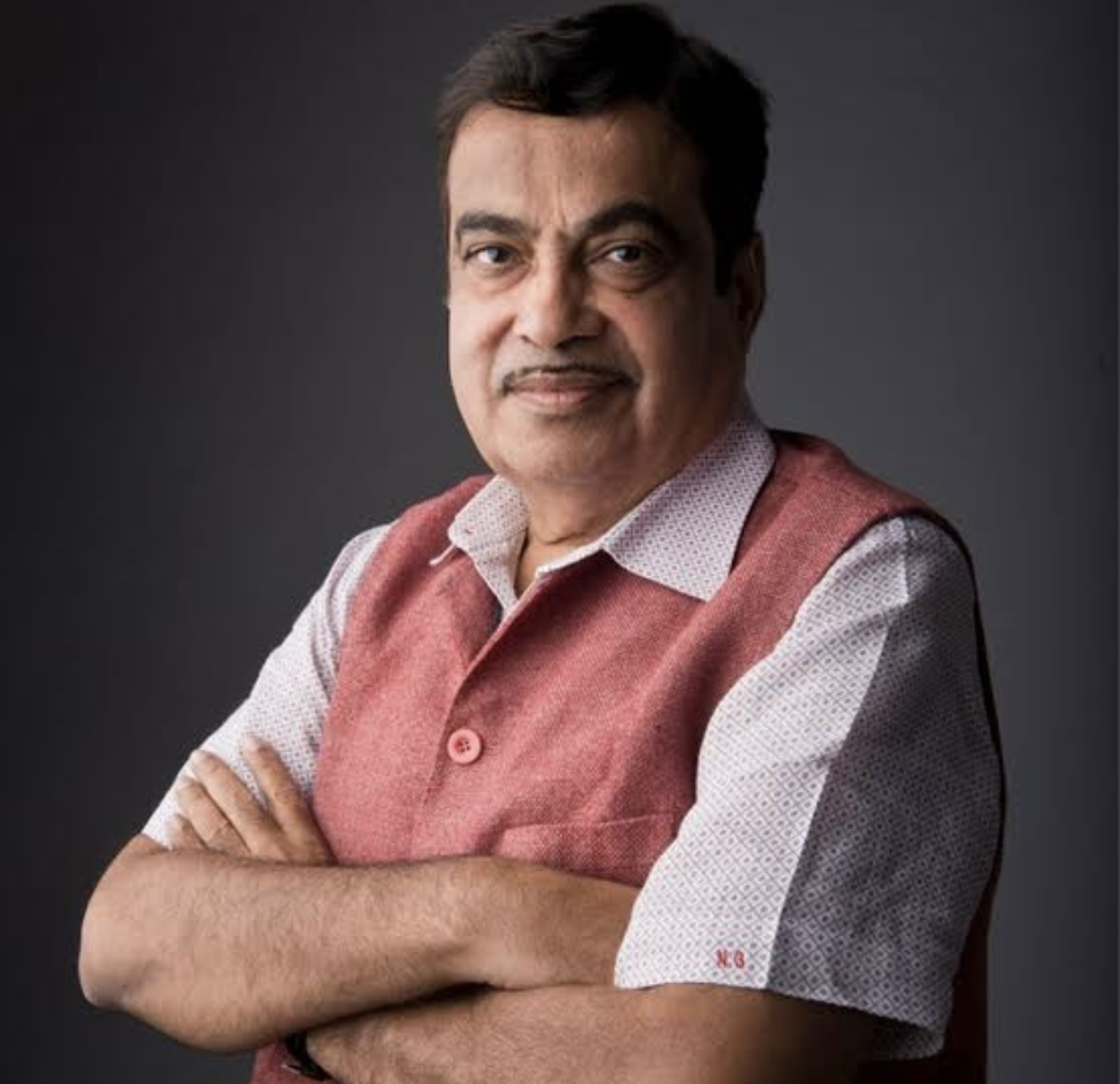
Nitin Gadkari

Notable alums of the university include Nitin Gadkari, who served as the Minister of Road Transport and Highways in the Government of India and occupied a prominent position in Indian politics. During his tenure, he took India's infrastructure sector a long way. At the same time, his leadership and infrastructure development initiatives profoundly impacted India's economic growth. Gadkari has played a key role in planning and implementing major road and shipping projects, connecting different parts of India more efficiently. His work has improved transportation and increased many trade and business opportunities, including initiatives such as Plan India (Bharatmala Pariyojana) and inland waterway development.

=== Harish Salve ===
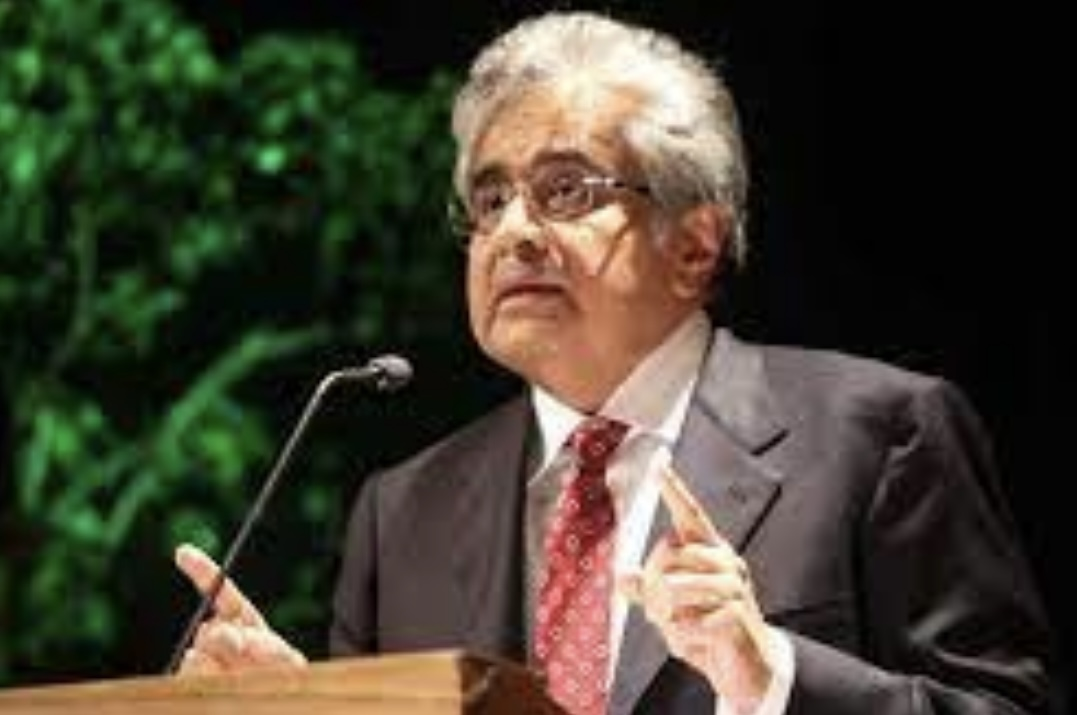
Harish Salve

In the field of law, Mr. Harish Salve obtained his Bachelor of Commerce (B.Com) and Bachelor of Laws (LL.B) degrees from Nagpur University. He is a prominent Supreme Court of India lawyer and has served as Solicitor General of India. He has been involved in several high-profile legal cases, representing clients in constitutional law, corporate law and international arbitration.

== Academic Research and Industry Collaboration ==
=== Academic Publications and Regional Policy Studies ===
The G.S. College of Commerce and Economics has become a centre for academic research and industry collaboration in a variety of areas, including finance, public policy, entrepreneurship and sustainability.

In 2022, the Ministry of Commerce led an empirical study titled "The Impact of Microcredit on Entrepreneurial Growth in the Vidaba Region", focusing on the growth paths and operational strategy adjustments of micro-enterprises after obtaining financial resources. The research team surveyed 513 MSME owners from Akola, Amravati and Nagpur through a structured questionnaire to analyse their asset growth, employment structure and market expansion after accessing microfinance.

=== E-commerce Growth and Commerce Education ===
Complementing institutional developments since the 2000s, broader national trends in commerce and digital education have reshaped curricula across India. The expansion of the e-commerce sector has significantly influenced the direction of commerce education, including at G.S. College. In response to emerging industry demands, institutions have increasingly incorporated subjects such as e-banking, digital marketing, and cyber law into their academic offerings. This shift highlights the alignment between commerce education and the evolving needs of trade and industry in the digital era. Modern commerce programmes have also focused on developing students' capacity in areas like online finance, cyber law, and e-commerce management to support India’s transition to a knowledge-based economy.

=== Industry Collaboration and Practical Learning Platforms ===
The College has actively aligned its research focus with India's contemporary economic reform agenda, drawing on frameworks such as the National MSME Policy (2020) and the National Education Policy (NEP, 2020) that emphasise industry-academia collaboration and entrepreneurship education. In line with these directives, the College has set up internal mechanisms such as the Research Advisory Group (RAG) and the Entrepreneurship Development Cell (EDC) aimed at fostering innovation, interdisciplinary research and start-up incubation among students and faculty. These bodies often collaborate with industry associations, chambers of commerce, and regional development agencies to conduct research in the context of the real economy of the Maharashtra and Vidarbha regions. In 2022, EDC partnered with the Maharashtra Entrepreneurship Development Centre (MEDC) to conduct a capacity-building programme for first-generation entrepreneurs, focusing on business model development and access to capital.
