= Wainganga College of Engineering and Management =

Engineering college in Nagpur, India

Coordinates: 20°59′42″N 79°01′44″E

- Established: 2008
- Location: Nagpur, Maharashtra, India
- Website: http://wcem.edu.in

Wainganga College of Engineering and Management (WCEM) located in Dongargaon, Nagpur, India, was established in 2008. In 2018, a panel led by Nagpur University found irregularities in the college's finances and alleged that WCEM had collected excess fees from students and failed to refund caution money. In 2019, WCEM applied to reduce its intake capacity. In 2020, principal Manish Bihade accused WCEM management of refusing to pay staff unless they recruited students.
