= Relative volatility =

Comparative volatility of components in a solution

Relative volatility is a measure comparing the vapor pressures of the components in a liquid mixture of chemicals. This quantity is widely used in designing large industrial distillation processes. In effect, it indicates the ease or difficulty of using distillation to separate the more volatile components from the less volatile components in a mixture. By convention, relative volatility is usually denoted as $\alpha$.

Relative volatilities are used in the design of all types of distillation processes as well as other separation or absorption processes that involve the contacting of vapor and liquid phases in a series of equilibrium stages.

Relative volatilities are not used in separation or absorption processes that involve components reacting with each other (for example, the absorption of gaseous carbon dioxide in aqueous solutions of sodium hydroxide).

== Definition ==
For a liquid mixture of two components (called a binary mixture) at a given temperature and pressure, the relative volatility is defined as

$$\alpha=\frac {(y_i/x_i)}{(y_j/x_j)} = K_i/K_j$$

where:
$\alpha$	= the relative volatility of the more volatile component $i$ to the less volatile component $j$
$y_i$	= the vapor–liquid equilibrium mole fraction of component $i$ in the vapor phase
$x_i$	= the vapor–liquid equilibrium mole fraction of component $i$ in the liquid phase
$y_j$	= the vapor–liquid equilibrium concentration of component $j$ in the vapor phase
$x_j$	= the vapor–liquid equilibrium concentration of component $j$ in the liquid phase
$(y/x)$	= Henry's law constant (also called the K value or vapor-liquid distribution ratio) of a component

When their liquid concentrations are equal, more volatile components have higher vapor pressures than less volatile components. Thus, a $K$ value (= $y/x$) for a more volatile component is larger than a $K$ value for a less volatile component. That means that $\alpha$ ≥ 1 since the larger $K$ value of the more volatile component is in the numerator and the smaller $K$ of the less volatile component is in the denominator.

$\alpha$ is a unitless quantity. When the volatilities of both key components are equal, $\alpha$ = 1 and separation of the two by distillation would be impossible under the given conditions because the compositions of the liquid and the vapor phase are the same (azeotrope). As the value of $\alpha$ increases above 1, separation by distillation becomes progressively easier.

Schematic diagram of a typical large-scale industrial distillation column

A liquid mixture containing two components is called a binary mixture. When a binary mixture is distilled, complete separation of the two components is rarely achieved. Typically, the overhead fraction from the distillation column consists predominantly of the more volatile component and some small amount of the less volatile component and the bottoms fraction consists predominantly of the less volatile component and some small amount of the more volatile component.

A liquid mixture containing many components is called a multi-component mixture. When a multi-component mixture is distilled, the overhead fraction and the bottoms fraction typically contain much more than one or two components. For example, some intermediate products in an oil refinery are multi-component liquid mixtures that may contain alkane, alkene and alkyne hydrocarbons—ranging from methane, having one carbon atom, to decanes having ten carbon atoms. For distilling such a mixture, the distillation column may be designed (for example) to produce:

- An overhead fraction containing predominantly the more volatile components ranging from methane (having one carbon atom) to propane (having three carbon atoms)
- A bottoms fraction containing predominantly the less volatile components ranging from isobutane (having four carbon atoms) to decanes (ten carbon atoms).

Such a distillation column is typically called a depropanizer.

The designer would designate the key components governing the separation design to be propane as the so-called light key (LK) and isobutane as the so-called heavy key (HK). In that context, a lighter component means a component with a lower boiling point (or a higher vapor pressure) and a heavier component means a component with a higher boiling point (or a lower vapor pressure).

Thus, for the distillation of any multi-component mixture, the relative volatility is often defined as

$$\alpha=\frac {(y_{LK}/x_{LK})}{(y_{HK}/x_{HK})} = K_{LK}/K_{HK}$$

Large-scale industrial distillation is rarely undertaken if the relative volatility is less than 1.05.

The values of $K$ have been correlated empirically or theoretically in terms of temperature, pressure and phase compositions in the form of equations, tables or graph such as the well-known DePriester charts.

$K$ values are widely used in the design of large-scale distillation columns for distilling multi-component mixtures in oil refineries, petrochemical and chemical plants, natural gas processing plants and other industries.

== See also ==
- Continuous distillation – Form of distillation
- Fractional distillation – Separation of a mixture into its component parts
- Vacuum distillation – Low-pressure and low-temperature distillation method
- Fractionation column – Equipment to separate liquids by distillation
- Phase diagram – Chart used to show conditions at which physical phases of a substance occur
- Theoretical plate – Hypothetical stage of matter
- McCabe–Thiele method – Chemical engineering technique
- Fenske equation – Equation used in chemical engineering
- Flash evaporation § Equilibrium flash of a multi-component liquid
- Volatility (chemistry) – Tendency of a substance to vaporize
