= Continuous distillation =

Form of distillation

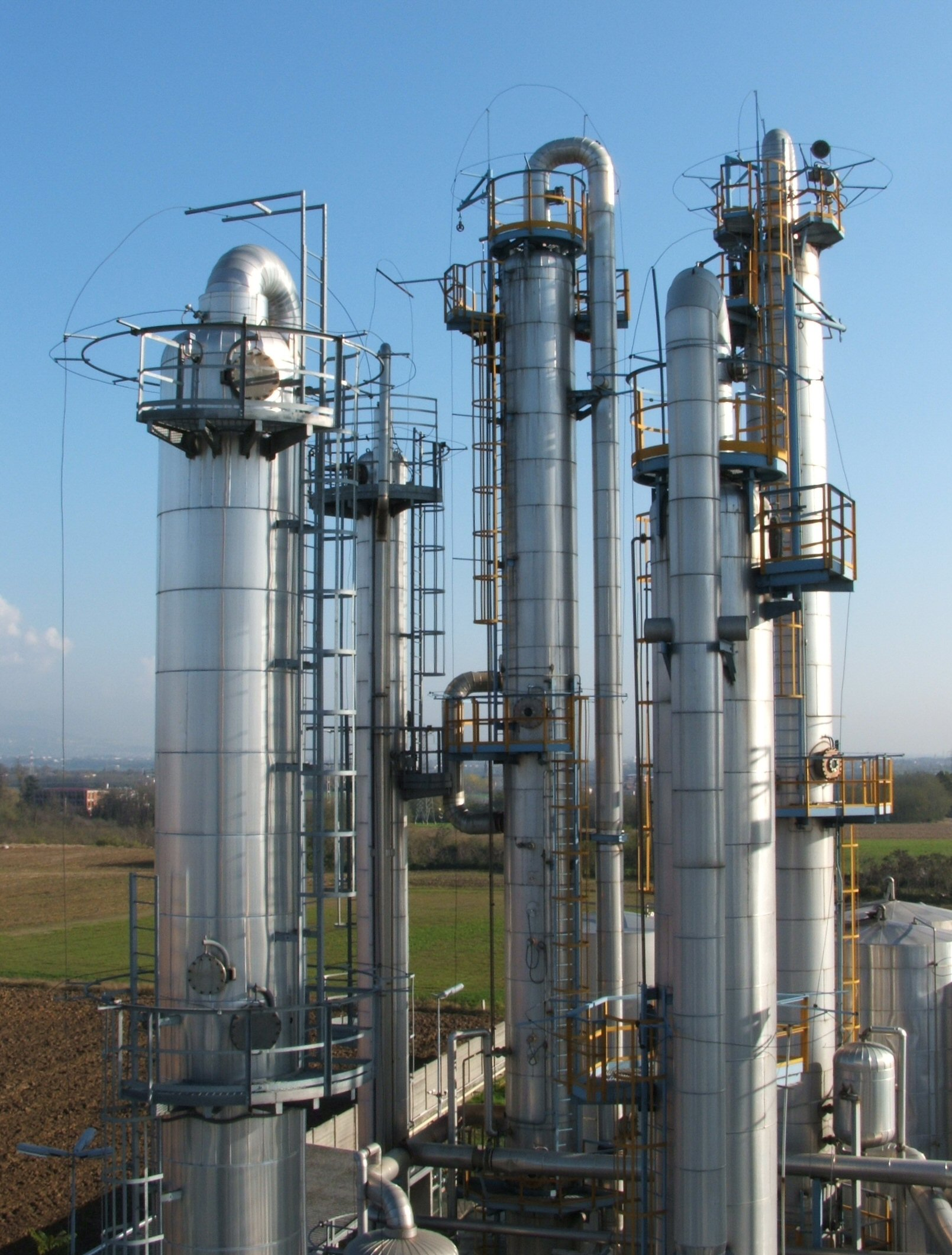
Image 1: Typical industrial distillation towers

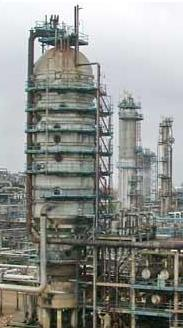
Image 2: A crude oil vacuum distillation column as used in oil refineries

Continuous distillation, a form of distillation, is an ongoing separation in which a mixture is continuously (without interruption) fed into the process and separated fractions are removed continuously as output streams. Distillation is the separation or partial separation of a liquid feed mixture into components or fractions by selective boiling (or evaporation) and condensation. The process produces at least two output fractions. These fractions include at least one volatile distillate fraction, which has boiled and been separately captured as a vapor condensed to a liquid, and practically always a bottoms (or residuum) fraction, which is the least volatile residue that has not been separately captured as a condensed vapor.

An alternative to continuous distillation is batch distillation, where the mixture is added to the unit at the start of the distillation, distillate fractions are taken out sequentially in time (one after another) during the distillation, and the remaining bottoms fraction is removed at the end. Because each of the distillate fractions are taken out at different times, only one distillate exit point (location) is needed for a batch distillation and the distillate can just be switched to a different receiver, a fraction-collecting container. Batch distillation is often used when smaller quantities are distilled. In a continuous distillation, each of the fraction streams is taken simultaneously throughout operation; therefore, a separate exit point is needed for each fraction. In practice when there are multiple distillate fractions, the distillate exit points are located at different heights on a fractionating column. The bottoms fraction can be taken from the bottom of the distillation column or unit, but is often taken from a reboiler connected to the bottom of the column.

Each fraction may contain one or more components (types of chemical compounds). When distilling crude oil or a similar feedstock, each fraction contains many components of similar volatility and other properties. Although it is possible to run a small-scale or laboratory continuous distillation, most often continuous distillation is used in a large-scale industrial process.

== Industrial application ==
Distillation is one of the unit operations of chemical engineering and food engineering. Continuous distillation is used widely in the chemical process industries where large quantities of liquids have to be distilled. Such industries are the natural gas processing, petrochemical production, coal tar processing, liquor production, liquified air separation, hydrocarbon solvents production, cannabinoid separation and similar industries, but it finds its widest application in petroleum refineries. In such refineries, the crude oil feedstock is a very complex multicomponent mixture that must be separated and yields of pure chemical compounds are not expected, only groups of compounds within a relatively small range of boiling points, which are called fractions. These fractions are the origin of the term fractional distillation or fractionation. It is often not worthwhile separating the components in these fractions any further based on product requirements and economics.

Industrial distillation is typically performed in large, vertical cylindrical columns (as shown in images 1 and 2) known as "distillation towers" or "distillation columns" with diameters ranging from about 65 centimeters to 11 meters and heights ranging from about 6 meters to 60 meters or more.

== Principle ==
Image 3: Chemical engineering schematic of Continuous Binary Fractional Distillation tower. A binary distillation separates a feed mixture stream into two fractions: one distillate and one bottoms fractions.

The principle for continuous distillation is the same as for normal distillation: when a liquid mixture is heated so that it boils, the composition of the vapor above the liquid differs from the liquid composition. If this vapor is then separated and condensed into a liquid, it becomes richer in the lower boiling point component(s) of the original mixture.

This is what happens in a continuous distillation column. A mixture is heated up, and routed into the distillation column. On entering the column, the feed starts flowing down but part of it, the component(s) with lower boiling point(s), vaporizes and rises. However, as it rises, it cools and while part of it continues up as vapor, some of it (enriched in the less volatile component) begins to descend again.

Image 3 depicts a simple continuous fractional distillation tower for separating a feed stream into two fractions, an overhead distillate product and a bottoms product. The "lightest" products (those with the lowest boiling point or highest volatility) exit from the top of the columns and the "heaviest" products (the bottoms, those with the highest boiling point) exit from the bottom of the column. The overhead stream may be cooled and condensed using a water-cooled or air-cooled condenser, or both. The bottoms reboiler may be steam-heated, hot oil-heated heat exchanger, heated by a stream elsewhere in the process, or even a gas or oil-fired furnace.

In a continuous distillation, the system is kept in a steady state or approximate steady state. Steady state means that quantities related to the process do not change as time passes during operation. Such constant quantities include feed input rate, output stream rates, heating and cooling rates, reflux ratio, and temperatures, pressures, and compositions at every point (location). Unless the process is disturbed due to changes in feed, heating, ambient temperature, or condensing, steady state is normally maintained. This is also the main attraction of continuous distillation, apart from the minimum amount of (easily instrumentable) surveillance; if the feed rate and feed composition are kept constant, product rate and quality are also constant. Even when a variation in conditions occurs, modern process control methods are commonly able to gradually return the continuous process to another steady state again.

Since a continuous distillation unit is fed constantly with a feed mixture and not filled all at once like a batch distillation, a continuous distillation unit does not need a sizable distillation pot, vessel, or reservoir for a batch fill. Instead, the mixture can be fed directly into the column, where the actual separation occurs. The height of the feed point along the column can vary on the situation and is designed so as to provide optimal results. See McCabe–Thiele method.

A continuous distillation is often a fractional distillation and can be a vacuum distillation or a steam distillation.

== Design and operation ==
Design and operation of a distillation column depends on the feed and desired products. Given a simple, binary component feed, analytical methods such as the McCabe–Thiele method or the Fenske equation can be used to assist in the design. For a multi-component feed, computerized simulation models are used both for design and subsequently in operation of the column as well. Modeling is also used to optimize already erected columns for the distillation of mixtures other than those the distillation equipment was originally designed for.

When a continuous distillation column is in operation, it has to be closely monitored for changes in feed composition, operating temperature and product composition. Many of these tasks are performed using advanced computer control equipment.

=== Column feed ===
The column can be fed in different ways. If the feed is from a source at a pressure higher than the distillation column pressure, it is simply piped into the column. Otherwise, the feed is pumped or compressed into the column. The feed may be a superheated vapor, a saturated vapor, a partially vaporized liquid-vapor mixture, a saturated liquid (i.e., liquid at its boiling point at the column's pressure), or a sub-cooled liquid. If the feed is a liquid at a much higher pressure than the column pressure and flows through a pressure let-down valve just ahead of the column, it will immediately expand and undergo a partial flash vaporization resulting in a liquid-vapor mixture as it enters the distillation column.

=== Improving separation ===
Image 4: Simplified chemical engineering schematic of Continuous Fractional Distillation tower separating one feed mixture stream into four distillate and one bottoms fractions

Although small size units, mostly made of glass, can be used in laboratories, industrial units are large, vertical, steel vessels (see images 1 and 2) known as "distillation towers" or "distillation columns". To improve the separation, the tower is normally provided inside with horizontal plates or trays as shown in image 5, or the column is packed with a packing material. To provide the heat required for the vaporization involved in distillation and also to compensate for heat loss, heat is most often added to the bottom of the column by a reboiler, and the purity of the top product can be improved by recycling some of the externally condensed top product liquid as reflux. Depending on their purpose, distillation columns may have liquid outlets at intervals up the length of the column as shown in image 4.

==== Reflux ====
Large-scale industrial fractionation towers use reflux to achieve more efficient separation of products. Reflux refers to the portion of the condensed overhead liquid product from a distillation tower that is returned to the upper part of the tower as shown in images 3 and 4. Inside the tower, the downflowing reflux liquid provides cooling and partial condensation of the upflowing vapors, thereby increasing the efficacy of the distillation tower. The more reflux that is provided, the better is the tower's separation of the lower boiling from the higher boiling components of the feed. A balance of heating with a reboiler at the bottom of a column and cooling by condensed reflux at the top of the column maintains a temperature gradient (or gradual temperature difference) along the height of the column to provide good conditions for fractionating the feed mixture. Reflux flows at the middle of the tower are called pumparounds.

Changing the reflux (in combination with changes in feed and product withdrawal) can also be used to improve the separation properties of a continuous distillation column while in operation (in contrast to adding plates or trays, or changing the packing, which would, at a minimum, require quite significant downtime).

==== Plates or trays ====
Image 5: Cross-sectional diagram of a binary fractional distillation tower with bubble-cap trays. (See theoretical plate for enlarged tray image.)

Distillation towers (such as in images 3 and 4) use various vapor and liquid contacting methods to provide the required number of equilibrium stages. Such devices are commonly known as "plates" or "trays". Each of these plates or trays is at a different temperature and pressure. The stage at the tower bottom has the highest pressure and temperature. Progressing upwards in the tower, the pressure and temperature decreases for each succeeding stage. The vapor–liquid equilibrium for each feed component in the tower reacts in its unique way to the different pressure and temperature conditions at each of the stages. That means that each component establishes a different concentration in the vapor and liquid phases at each of the stages, and this results in the separation of the components. Some example trays are depicted in image 5. A more detailed, expanded image of two trays can be seen in the theoretical plate article. The reboiler often acts as an additional equilibrium stage.

If each physical tray or plate were 100% efficient, then the number of physical trays needed for a given separation would equal the number of equilibrium stages or theoretical plates. However, that is very seldom the case. Hence, a distillation column needs more plates than the required number of theoretical vapor–liquid equilibrium stages.

==== Packing ====
Another way of improving the separation in a distillation column is to use a packing material instead of trays. These offer the advantage of a lower pressure drop across the column (when compared to plates or trays), beneficial when operating under vacuum. If a distillation tower uses packing instead of trays, the number of necessary theoretical equilibrium stages is first determined and then the packing height equivalent to a theoretical equilibrium stage, known as the height equivalent to a theoretical plate (HETP), is also determined. The total packing height required is the number of theoretical stages multiplied by the HETP.

This packing material can either be random dumped packing such as Raschig rings or structured sheet metal. Liquids tend to wet the surface of the packing and the vapors pass across this wetted surface, where mass transfer takes place. Unlike conventional tray distillation in which every tray represents a separate point of vapor–liquid equilibrium, the vapor–liquid equilibrium curve in a packed column is continuous. However, when modeling packed columns it is useful to compute a number of theoretical plates to denote the separation efficiency of the packed column with respect to more traditional trays. Differently shaped packings have different surface areas and void space between packings. Both of these factors affect packing performance.

Another factor in addition to the packing shape and surface area that affects the performance of random or structured packing is liquid and vapor distribution entering the packed bed. The number of theoretical stages required to make a given separation is calculated using a specific vapor to liquid ratio. If the liquid and vapor are not evenly distributed across the superficial tower area as it enters the packed bed, the liquid to vapor ratio will not be correct in the packed bed and the required separation will not be achieved. The packing will appear to not be working properly. The height equivalent to a theoretical plate (HETP) will be greater than expected. The problem is not the packing itself but the mal-distribution of the fluids entering the packed bed. Liquid mal-distribution is more frequently the problem than vapor. The design of the liquid distributors used to introduce the feed and reflux to a packed bed is critical to making the packing perform at maximum efficiency. Methods of evaluating the effectiveness of a liquid distributor can be found in references.

=== Overhead system arrangements ===
Images 4 and 5 assume an overhead stream that is totally condensed into a liquid product using water or air-cooling. However, in many cases, the tower overhead is not easily condensed totally and the reflux drum must include a vent gas outlet stream. In yet other cases, the overhead stream may also contain water vapor because either the feed stream contains some water or some steam is injected into the distillation tower (which is the case in the crude oil distillation towers in oil refineries). In those cases, if the distillate product is insoluble in water, the reflux drum may contain a condensed liquid distillate phase, a condensed water phase and a non-condensible gas phase, which makes it necessary that the reflux drum also have a water outlet stream.

== Multicomponent distillation ==
Beside fractional distillation, that is mainly used for crude oil refining, multicomponent mixtures are usually processed in order to purify their single components by means of a series of distillation columns, i.e. the distillation train.

=== Distillation train ===
A distillation train is defined by a sequence of distillation columns arranged in series or in parallel whose aim is the multicomponent mixtures purification.

=== Process intensifying alternatives ===
The Dividing Wall Column unit is most common process-intensifying unit related to distillation. In particular, it is the arrangement in a single column shell of the Petlyuk configuration that has been proved to be thermodynamically equivalent.

== Examples ==
=== Continuous distillation of crude oil ===
Petroleum crude oils contain hundreds of different hydrocarbon compounds: paraffins, naphthenes and aromatics as well as organic sulfur compounds, organic nitrogen compounds and some oxygen-containing hydrocarbons such as phenols. Although crude oils generally do not contain olefins, they are formed in many of the processes used in a petroleum refinery.

The crude oil fractionator does not produce products having a single boiling point; rather, it produces fractions having boiling ranges. For example, the crude oil fractionator produces an overhead fraction called "naphtha" which becomes a gasoline component after it is further processed through a catalytic hydrodesulfurizer to remove sulfur and a catalytic reformer to reform its hydrocarbon molecules into more complex molecules with a higher octane rating value.

The naphtha cut, as that fraction is called, contains many different hydrocarbon compounds. Therefore, it has an initial boiling point of about 35 °C and a final boiling point of about 200 °C. Each cut produced in the fractionating columns has a different boiling range. At some distance below the overhead, the next cut is withdrawn from the side of the column and it is usually the jet fuel cut, also known as a kerosene cut. The boiling range of that cut is from an initial boiling point of about 150 °C to a final boiling point of about 270 °C, and it also contains many different hydrocarbons. The next cut further down the tower is the diesel oil cut with a boiling range from about 180 °C to about 315 °C. The boiling ranges between any cut and the next cut overlap because the distillation separations are not perfectly sharp. After these come the heavy fuel oil cuts and finally the bottoms product, with very wide boiling ranges. All these cuts are processed further in subsequent refining processes.

=== Continuous distillation of cannabis concentrates ===
A typical application for distilling cannabis concentrates is butane hash oil (BHO). Short path distillation is a popular method due to the short residence time which allows for minimal thermal stress to the concentrate. In other distillation methods such as circulation, falling film and column distillation the concentrate would be damaged from the long residence times and high temperatures that must be applied.

== See also ==
- Azeotropic distillation
- Extractive distillation
- Fractional distillation
- Fractionating column
- Steam distillation
- Short path distillation
