= Separating column =

Separating column may refer to:

- A fractionating column
- A column containing ion-exchange resin
