= Hand boiler =

Science demonstrator and novelty item

Sketch of hand boiler. Left: both bulbs are at the same temperature. Right: the bottom bulb is warmer than the top bulb.

A hand boiler or (less commonly) love meter is a glass sculpture used as an experimental tool to demonstrate vapour-liquid equilibrium, or as a collector's item to whimsically "measure love." It consists of a lower bulb containing a volatile liquid and a mixture of gases that is connected usually by a twisting glass tube that connects to an upper or "receiving" glass bulb.

== Mechanics ==
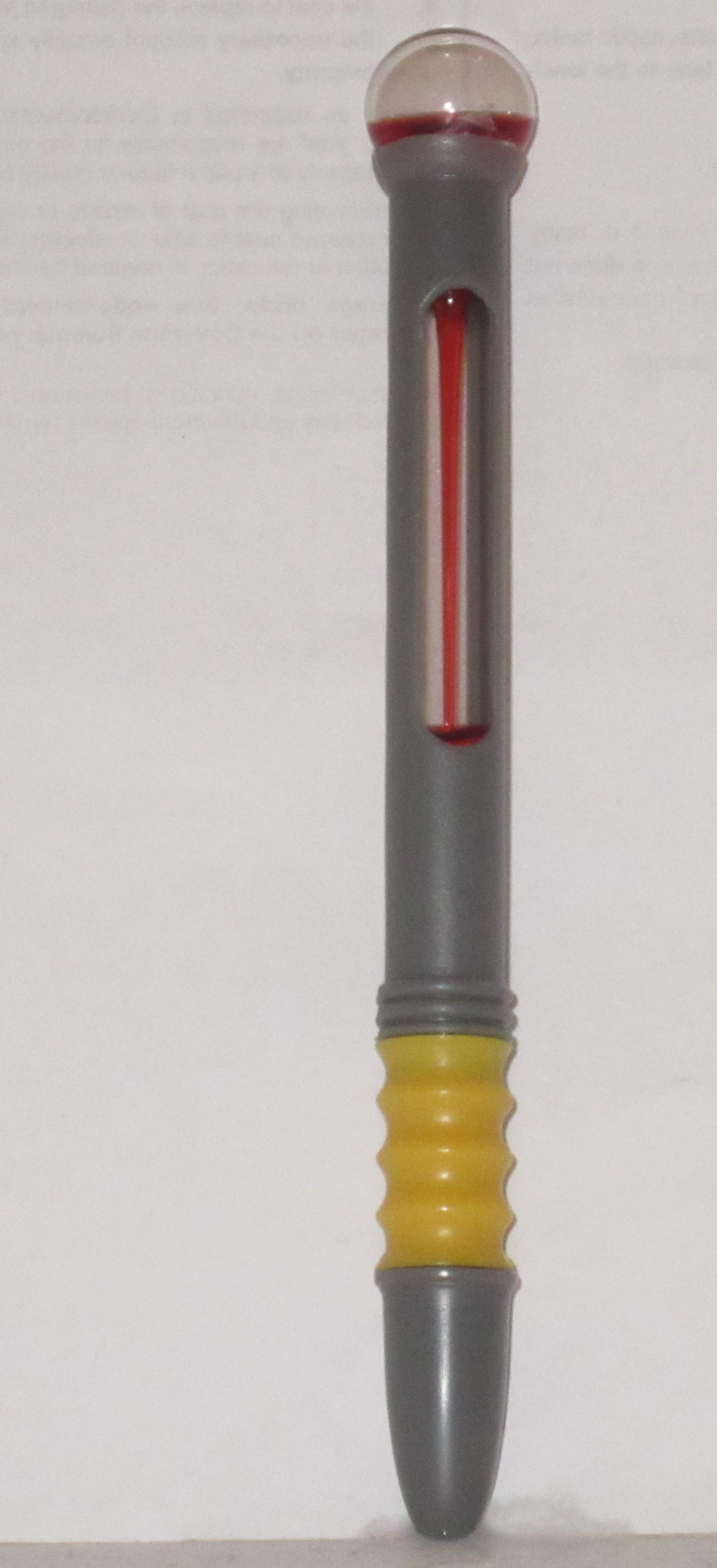
Hand boiler toy, built into a ballpoint pen. The warmth from the fingertips increases air pressure inside the tube, causing the liquid to rise and bubble up into the top chamber as if the liquid was boiling.

A hand boiler functions similar to the "drinking bird" toy: The upper and lower bulbs of the device are at different temperatures, and therefore the vapor pressure in the two bulbs is different. Since the lower bulb is warmer, the vapor pressure in it is higher. The difference in vapor pressure forces the liquid from the lower bulb to the upper bulb. Thus:

$\Delta h = \frac{\Delta p}{\rho g}$

where:
$\Delta h$ = the height of the column of fluid above the fluid's level in the lower bulb
$\Delta p$ = the difference in vapor pressure between the two bulbs (which can be determined via the Antoine equation)
$\rho$ = the density of the liquid
$g$ = the acceleration of gravity at the Earth's surface

The boiling is caused by the relationship between the temperature and pressure of a gas. As the temperature of a gas in a closed container rises, the pressure also rises. There must be a temperature (and pressure) difference between the two large chambers for the liquid to move. When held upright (with the smaller bulb on top), the liquid will move from the bulb with the higher pressure to the bulb with lower pressure. As the gas continues to expand, the gas will then bubble through the liquid, boiling. The fact that the liquid is volatile (easily vaporized) makes the hand boiler more effective. Adding heat to the liquid produces more gas, also increasing pressure in the closed container.

Sometimes a hand boiler is used to show properties of distillation. Since the liquid both evaporates and condenses at relatively cool temperatures while in an enclosed system, the boiler can be turned upside down, and the top end can be placed in ice water. The gaseous form of the liquid will condense in the cooled chamber. Since the liquid is often colored with dye, but the dye does not evaporate or condense at the same temperature, the liquid that condenses in the cooled chamber is colorless, leaving the pigment behind.

== Popular culture ==
In popular culture, hand boilers used to be sometimes known as "love meters" because the tube that separates the upper and lower bulbs is twisted into a heart shape and the volatile liquid is colored red. Love meters were a common collector's item or a souvenir. Depending on how the item was packaged, one would grasp the lower bulb to "prove" how passionate one was, or a couple would each grasp one end to see who would force the liquid into the other's bulb.

Hand boilers are much more commonly used as a scientific novelty today.

== History ==
Hand boilers date back at least as early as 1767, when the American polymath Benjamin Franklin encountered them in Germany. He developed an improved version in 1768, after which they were called Franklin's pulse glass or palm glass or pulse hammer (German: Pulshammer) or water hammer (German: Wasserhammer).

== See also ==
- Charles's law
- Drinking Bird
- Gas laws
- Vapor–liquid equilibrium
