= Ernest Thiele =

American Chemical Engineer

Ernest W. Thiele
- Ernest Thiele
- Born: December 8, 1895; U.S.
- Died: 29 November 1993 (aged 97)
- Education: Loyola University; University of Illinois, Urbana-Champaign; MIT
- Known for: Distillation Graphical Theory; Computational Approaches to Distillation; Thiele modulus Extraction of Lubricants
- Awards: Founders Award (AIChE, 1966); National Academy of Engineering (1980); Honorary Doctorate, Notre Dame 1971
- Scientific career
- Fields: Chemical engineering
- Workplaces: University of Notre Dame; Standard Oil Company / Amoco
- Doctoral advisor: R. T. Haslam

Ernest W. Thiele (pronounced /ˈtiːli/; 1895–1993) was an influential chemical engineering researcher at Standard Oil (then Amoco, now BP) and professor of chemical engineering at the University of Notre Dame. He is known for his highly impactful work in chemical reaction engineering, complex reacting systems, and separations, including distillation theory.

== Early life and education ==
Ernest Thiele, born on December 8, 1895, grew up in Chicago, Illinois. In 1916, he earned an A.B. degree from Loyola University in Chicago. He was stationed at the University of Illinois at Urbana–Champaign with the U.S. Army, where he completed a bachelor's degree in chemical engineering in 1919. In the fall of 1922, matriculated to MIT where he began graduate studies under the direction of Professor Robert T. Haslam; he earned his M.S. degree in 1923 and a doctoral degree in 1925 with a thesis on steam-carbon reactions.

== Career ==
Before starting his graduate degree at MIT, Thiele worked for six months for Swift and Company in Chicago and later in Baltimore as a process analyst, before being employed with Peoples Gas Light and Coke Company as a chemical engineer from 1920 to 1922. After completing his doctoral thesis on steam-carbon reactions, he developed (jointly with McCabe) a graphical method of design for fractionating (i.e., distillation) columns as a transformational publication in Industrial and Engineering Chemistry in 1925. This approach to the design of distillation columns was rapidly adopted in undergraduate textbooks and has remained the traditional approach to teaching distillation to undergraduate chemical engineers for almost a century.

Thiele joined the Standard Oil Company of Indiana (then Amoco, now BP) as a chemical engineer in 1925. He continued with this company for 35 years becoming an assistant director for research in 1935 and associate director for research in 1950. During the period of World War II, he contributed to numerous technologies related to nuclear materials processing and atomic energy including a heavy water extraction facility, the Lexington Project for the design of nuclear-powered aircraft, and as a consultant to the Congressional Joint Committee on Atomic Energy.

During 35 years at Standard Oil, Thiele exhibited remarkable creativity and produced 17 landmark publications, and 27 U.S. patents that served as the foundation of chemical engineering. Classic engineering papers include his breakthrough paper on the efficient design of distillation systems via computational methods with co-author R.L. Geddes published in 1933 in Industrial and Engineering Chemistry. Further work led to the development of solvent extraction of lubricating oils. Another landmark contribution was the 1939 Industrial & Engineering Chemistry paper that described the Thiele modulus, a dimensionless quantity describing the boundary between reaction-controlled and transport-controlled catalytic particles.

Following retirement from Standard Oil, Thiele became a professor of chemical engineering at Notre Dame where he taught courses in thermodynamics, reactions, instrumentation, process control, and simulation. Following 10 years at Notre Dame, Thiele returned to Chicago and lived the next 27 years in the Skokie-Evanston area. Thiele died November 29, 1993, in the Presbyterian Home in Evanston.

== Honors ==
Thiele was awarded the Founders Award by the American Institute of Chemical Engineers in 1966 and elected to the National Academy of Engineering (NAE) in 1980. In 1971, the University of Notre Dame awarded Thiele an honorary doctorate for his many contributions to chemical engineering. He was a member of the Chicago Chemists Club and the American Chemical Society, in addition to being a fellow of the American Institute of Chemical Engineers (AIChE).

In 1986, the chemical engineering department of the University of Notre Dame established the Thiele Lectureship in Chemical Engineering. The lectureship recognizes excellent contributions to chemical engineering by young members of the chemical engineering profession. The first Thiele lecture was presented by Professor Douglas Lauffenburger, with Ernest Thiele in attendance. The lectureship is given every year, with the presenter selected by the faculty of chemical engineering at the University of Notre Dame.

== Key publications ==
Ernest Thiele has authored numerous journal articles describing significant advances in chemical reaction engineering which includes but is not limited to:

- W.L. McCabe, E.W. Thiele, "Graphical Design of Fractionating Columns", Industrial & Engineering Chemistry 17, 605, (1925).
- E.W. Thiele, "Prediction of Flash Point of Blends of Lubricating Oils", Industrial & Engineering Chemistry 19, 259, (1927).
- E.W. Thiele, R.L. Geddes, "Computation of Distillation Apparatus for Hydrocarbon Mixtures", Industrial & Engineering Chemistry 25, 289 (1933).
- E.W. Thiele, W.B. Kay "Densities of Hydrocarbon Mixtures", Industrial & Engineering Chemistry 25, 894 (1933).
- M.C. Rogers, E.W. Thiele, "Pressure Drop in Bubble-Cap Columns", Industrial & Engineering Chemistry 26, 524 (1934).
- E.W. Thiele, "Application of Graphical Method of Ponchon to Distillation and Extraction", Industrial & Engineering Chemistry 27, 392 (1935).
- M.C. Rogers, E.W. Thiele, "Bubble-Cap Column as a Liquid-Liquid Contact Apparatus", Industrial & Engineering Chemistry 29, 529 (1937).
- E.W. Thiele, "Relation Between Catalytic Activity and Size of Particle", Industrial & Engineering Chemistry 31, 916 (1939).
- E.W. Thiele, "Material and Heat Transfer between a Granular Solid and Flowing Fluid", Industrial & Engineering Chemistry 38, 646 (1946).
