= Thiele modulus =

Catalytic activity is related to the size of particle

The Thiele modulus was developed by Ernest Thiele in his paper 'Relation between catalytic activity and size of particle' in 1939. Thiele reasoned that a large enough particle has a reaction rate so rapid that diffusion forces can only carry the product away from the surface of the catalyst particle. Therefore, only the surface of the catalyst would experience any reaction.

The Thiele Modulus was developed to describe the relationship between diffusion and reaction rates in porous catalyst pellets with no mass transfer limitations. This value is generally used to measure the effectiveness factor of pellets.

The Thiele modulus is represented by different symbols in different texts, but is defined in Hill as h_{T}.

$$h^2_{T} = \dfrac{ \mbox{reaction rate} }{ \mbox{diffusion rate} }$$

== Overview ==
The derivation of the Thiele Modulus (from Hill) begins with a material balance on the catalyst pore. For a first-order irreversible reaction in a straight cylindrical pore at steady state:

${\pi} r^2\left ( -D_c \frac{dC}{dx} \right )_x = {\pi}r^2\left ( -D_c \frac{dC}{dx} \right )_{x+{\Delta}x}+\left ( 2{\pi}r{\Delta}x \right )\left ( k_1C \right )$

where $D_c$ is a diffusivity constant, and $k_1$ is the rate constant.

Then, turning the equation into a differential by dividing by ${\Delta}x$ and taking the limit as ${\Delta}x$ approaches 0,

$D_c\left (\frac{d^2C}{dx^2} \right ) = \frac{2k_1C}{r}$

This differential equation with the following boundary conditions:

$C=C_o \text{ at } x=0$

and

$\frac{dC}{dx} = 0 \text{ at } x= L$

where the first boundary condition indicates a constant external concentration on one end of the pore and the second boundary condition indicates that there is no flow out of the other end of the pore.

Plugging in these boundary conditions, we have

$\frac{d^2C}{d(x/L)^2} = \left (\frac{2k_1L^2}{rD_c} \right) C$

The term on the right side multiplied by C represents the square of the Thiele Modulus, which we now see rises naturally out of the material balance. Then the Thiele modulus for a first order reaction is:

$h^2_T=\frac{2k_1L^2}{rD_c}$

From this relation it is evident that with large values of $h_T$, the rate term dominates and the reaction is fast, while slow diffusion limits the overall rate. Smaller values of the Thiele modulus represent slow reactions with fast diffusion.

== Other forms ==
Other order reactions may be solved in a similar manner as above. The results are listed below for irreversible reactions in straight cylindrical pores.

=== Second order Reaction ===
$h^2_2=\frac{2L^2k_2C_o}{rD_c}$

=== Zero order reaction ===
$h^2_o=\frac{2L^2k_o}{rD_cC_o}$

=== Effectiveness Factor ===
The effectiveness factor η relates the diffusive reaction rate with the rate of reaction in the bulk stream.

For a first order reaction in a slab geometry, this is:

${\eta} = \frac{\tanh h_T}{h_T}$
