= Fractionating column =

Equipment to separate liquids by distillation

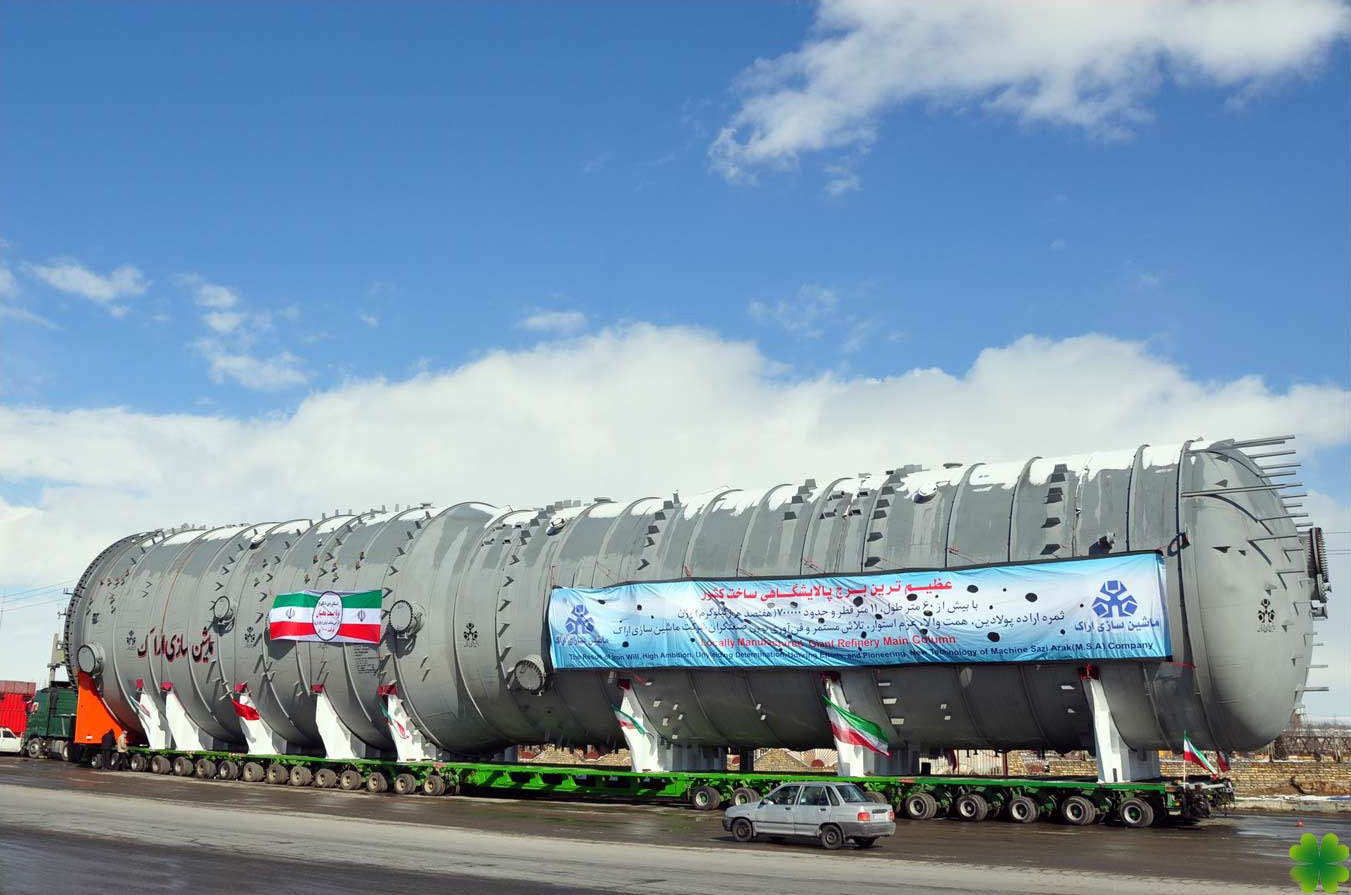
Giant fractionating column of Arak Oil Refinery designed and manufactured by Machine Sazi Arak (MSA)

A fractionating column or fractional column is equipment used in the distillation of liquid mixtures to separate the mixture into its component parts, or fractions, based on their differences in volatility. Fractionating columns are used in small-scale laboratory distillations as well as large-scale industrial distillations.

== Laboratory fractionating columns ==
Figure 1: Fractional distillation apparatus using a Liebig condenser.

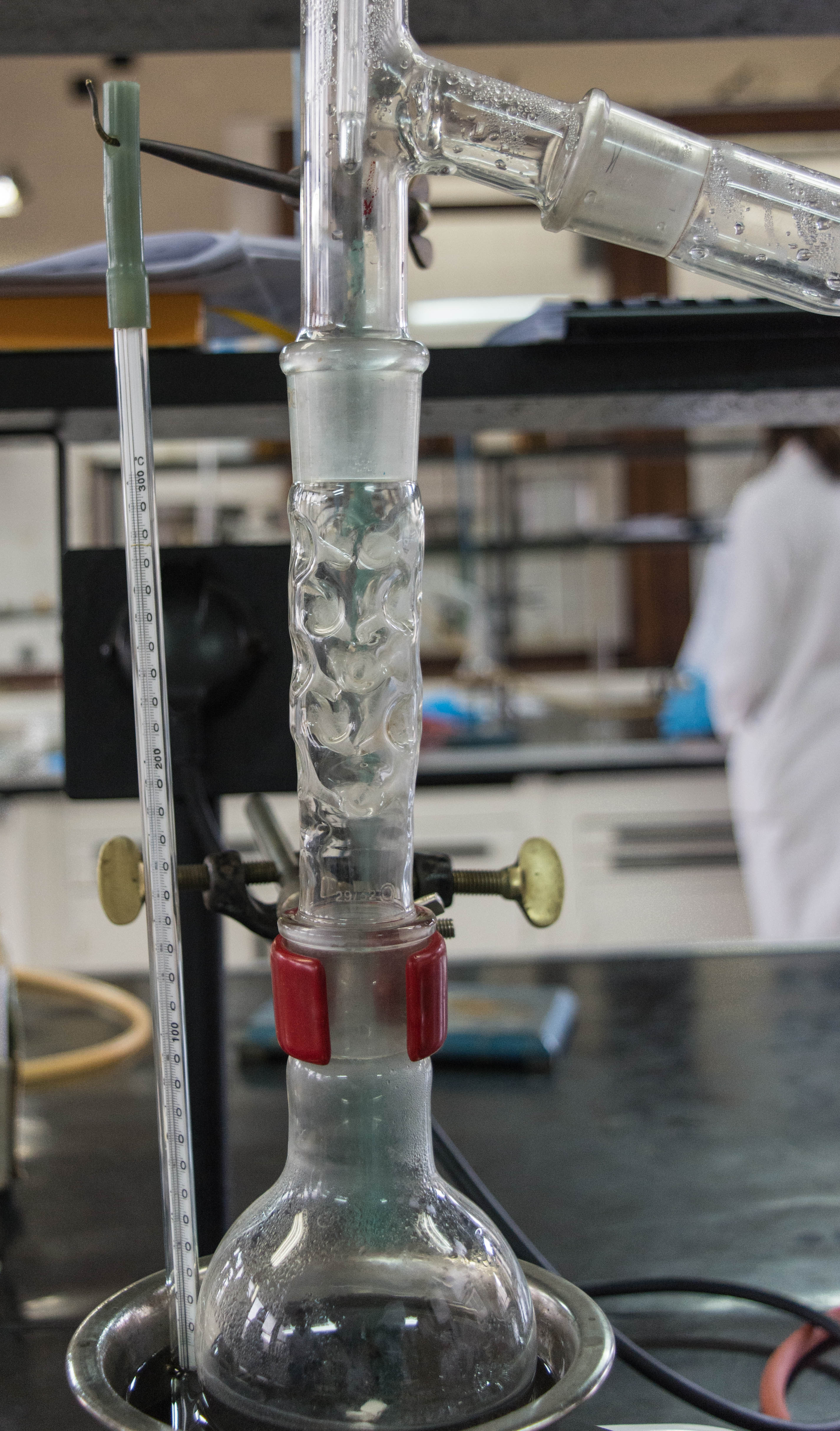
Vigreux column in a laboratory setup

A laboratory fractionating column is a piece of glassware used to separate vaporized mixtures of liquid compounds with close volatility. Most commonly used is either a Vigreux column or a straight column packed with glass beads or metal pieces such as Raschig rings. Fractionating columns help to separate the mixture by allowing the mixed vapors to cool, condense, and vaporize again in accordance with Raoult's law. With each condensation-vaporization cycle, the vapors are enriched in a certain component. A larger surface area allows more cycles, improving separation. This is the rationale for a Vigreux column or a packed fractionating column. Spinning band distillation achieves the same outcome by using a rotating band within the column to force the rising vapors and descending condensate into close contact, achieving equilibrium more quickly.

In a typical fractional distillation, a liquid mixture is heated in the distilling flask, and the resulting vapor rises up the fractionating column (see Figure 1). The vapor condenses on glass spurs (known as theoretical trays or theoretical plates) inside the column, and returns to the distilling flask, refluxing the rising distillate vapor. The hottest tray is at the bottom of the column and the coolest tray is at the top. At steady-state conditions, the vapor and liquid on each tray reach an equilibrium. Only the most volatile of the vapors stays in gas form all the way to the top, where it may then proceed through a condenser, which cools the vapor until it condenses into a liquid distillate. The separation may be enhanced by the addition of more trays (to a practical limitation of heat, flow, etc.).

== Industrial fractionating columns ==
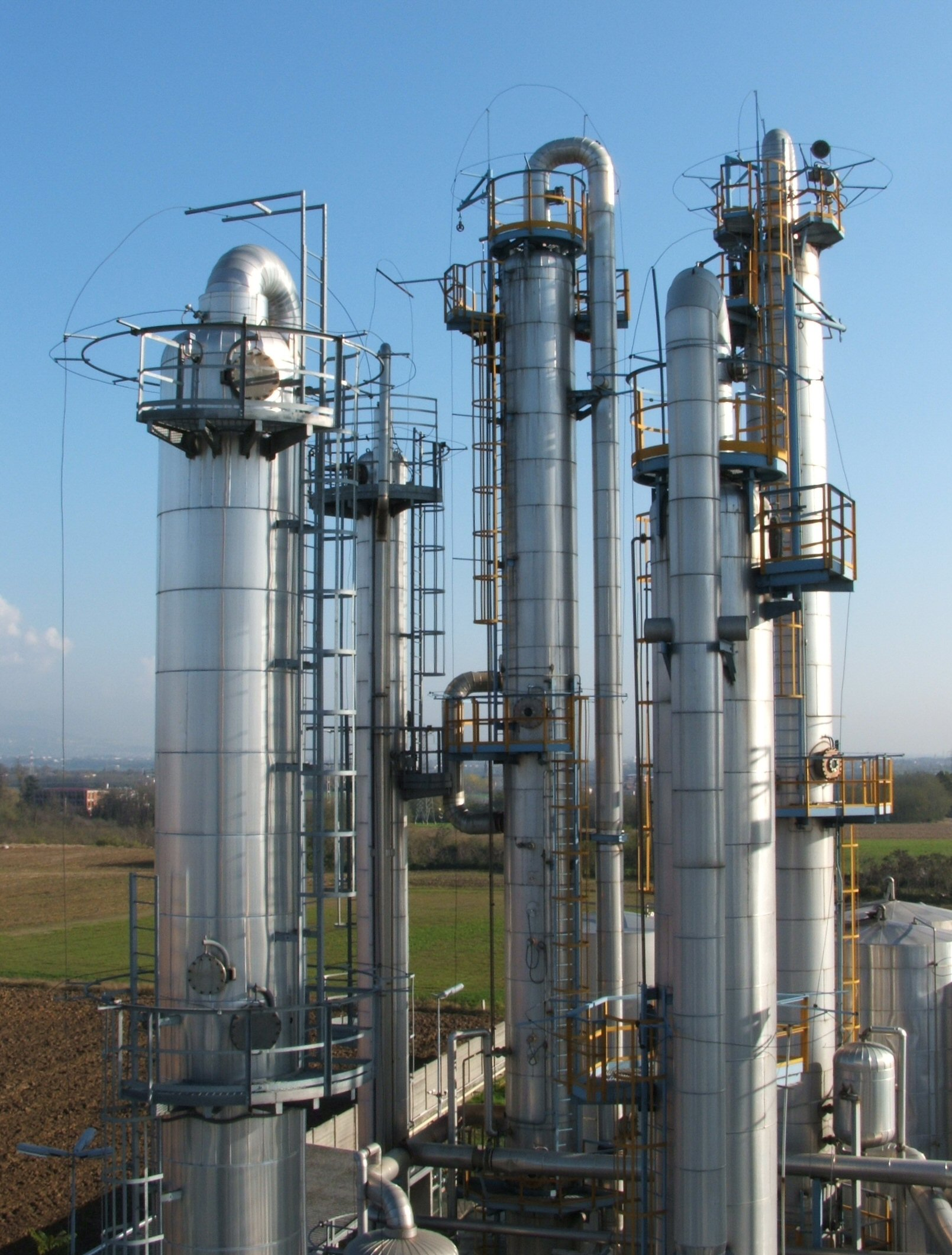
Figure 2: Typical industrial fractionating columns

Figure 3: Chemical engineering schematic of a continuous fractionating column

Figure 4: Chemical engineering schematic of typical bubble-cap trays in a fractionating column

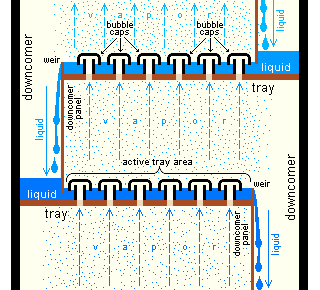
Figure 5: Section of fractionating tower of Figure 4 showing detail of a pair of trays with bubble caps

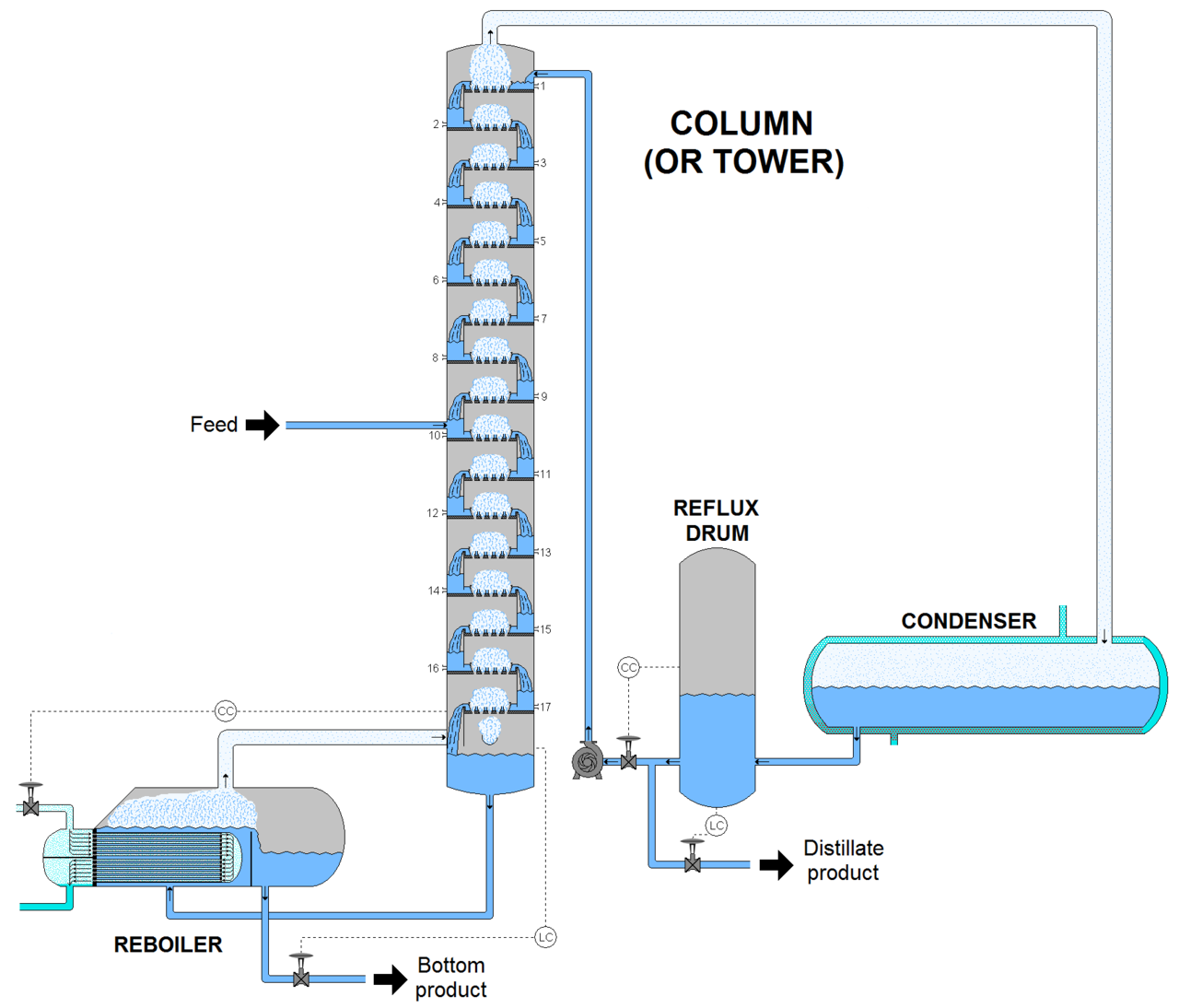
Figure 6: Entire view of a Distillation Column

Fractional distillation is one of the unit operations of chemical engineering. Fractionating columns are widely used in chemical process industries where large quantities of liquids have to be distilled. Such industries are petroleum processing, petrochemical production, natural gas processing, coal tar processing, brewing, liquefied air separation, and hydrocarbon solvents production. Fractional distillation finds its widest application in petroleum refineries. In such refineries, the crude oil feedstock is a complex, multicomponent mixture that must be separated. Yields of pure chemical compounds are generally not expected, however, yields of groups of compounds within a relatively small range of boiling points, also called fractions, are expected. This process is the origin of the name fractional distillation or fractionation.

Distillation is one of the most common and energy-intensive separation processes. Effectiveness of separation is dependent upon the height and diameter of the column, the ratio of the column's height to diameter, and the material that comprises the distillation column itself. In a typical chemical plant, it accounts for about 40% of the total energy consumption. Industrial distillation is typically performed in large, vertical cylindrical columns (as shown in Figure 2) known as "distillation towers" or "distillation columns" with diameters ranging from about 65 centimeters to 6 meters and heights ranging from about 6 meters to 60 meters or more.

Industrial distillation towers are usually operated at a continuous steady state. Unless disturbed by changes in feed, heat, ambient temperature, or condensing, the amount of feed being added normally equals the amount of product being removed.

The amount of heat entering the column from the reboiler and with the feed must equal the amount heat removed by the overhead condenser and with the products. The heat entering a distillation column is a crucial operating parameter, addition of excess or insufficient heat to the column can lead to foaming, weeping, entrainment, or flooding.

Figure 3 depicts an industrial fractionating column separating a feed stream into one distillate fraction and one bottoms fraction. However, many industrial fractionating columns have outlets at intervals up the column so that multiple products having different boiling ranges may be withdrawn from a column distilling a multi-component feed stream. The "lightest" products with the lowest boiling points exit from the top of the columns and the "heaviest" products with the highest boiling points exit from the bottom.

Industrial fractionating columns use external reflux to achieve better separation of products. Reflux refers to the portion of the condensed overhead liquid product that returns to the upper part of the fractionating column as shown in Figure 3.

Inside the column, the downflowing reflux liquid provides cooling and condensation of upflowing vapors thereby increasing the efficacy of the distillation tower. The more reflux and/or more trays provided, the better is the tower's separation of lower boiling materials from higher boiling materials.

The design and operation of a fractionating column depends on the composition of the feed as well as the composition of the desired products. Given a simple, binary component feed, analytical methods such as the McCabe–Thiele method or the Fenske equation can be used. For a multi-component feed, simulation models are used both for design, operation, and construction.

Bubble-cap "trays" or "plates" are one of the types of physical devices, which are used to provide good contact between the upflowing vapor and the downflowing liquid inside an industrial fractionating column. Such trays are shown in Figures 4 and 5.

The efficiency of a tray or plate is typically lower than that of a theoretical 100% efficient equilibrium stage. Hence, a fractionating column almost always needs more actual, physical plates than the required number of theoretical vapor–liquid equilibrium stages.

In industrial uses, sometimes a packing material is used in the column instead of trays, especially when low pressure drops across the column are required, as when operating under vacuum. This packing material can either be random dumped packing (1–3 in or 2.5–7.6 cm wide) such as Raschig rings or structured sheet metal. Liquids tend to wet the surface of the packing, and the vapors pass across this wetted surface, where mass transfer takes place. Differently shaped packings have different surface areas and void space between packings. Both of these factors affect packing performance.

== See also ==
- Azeotropic distillation
- Batch distillation
- Continuous distillation
- Extractive distillation
- Laboratory glassware
- Steam distillation
- Theoretical plate
- Vacuum distillation
- Fractional distillation
