= Reflux =

Condensation of vapors and their return to where they originated

The reflux system in a typical industrial distillation column

Reflux is a technique involving the condensation of vapors and the return of this condensate to the system from which it originated. It is used in industrial and laboratory distillations. It is also used in chemistry to supply energy to reactions over a long period of time.

== Reflux in industrial distillation ==
The term reflux is very widely used in industries that utilize large-scale distillation columns and fractionators such as petroleum refineries, petrochemical and chemical plants, and natural gas processing plants.

In that context, reflux refers to the portion of the overhead liquid product from a distillation column or fractionator that is returned to the upper part of the column as shown in the schematic diagram of a typical industrial distillation column. Inside the column, the downflowing reflux liquid provides cooling and condensation of the upflowing vapors thereby increasing the efficiency of the distillation column.

The more reflux provided for a given number of theoretical plates, the better is the column's separation of lower boiling materials from higher boiling materials. Conversely, for a given desired separation, the more reflux is provided, the fewer theoretical plates are required.

== Reflux in chemical reactions ==
Laboratory reflux apparatus for heating a chemical reaction

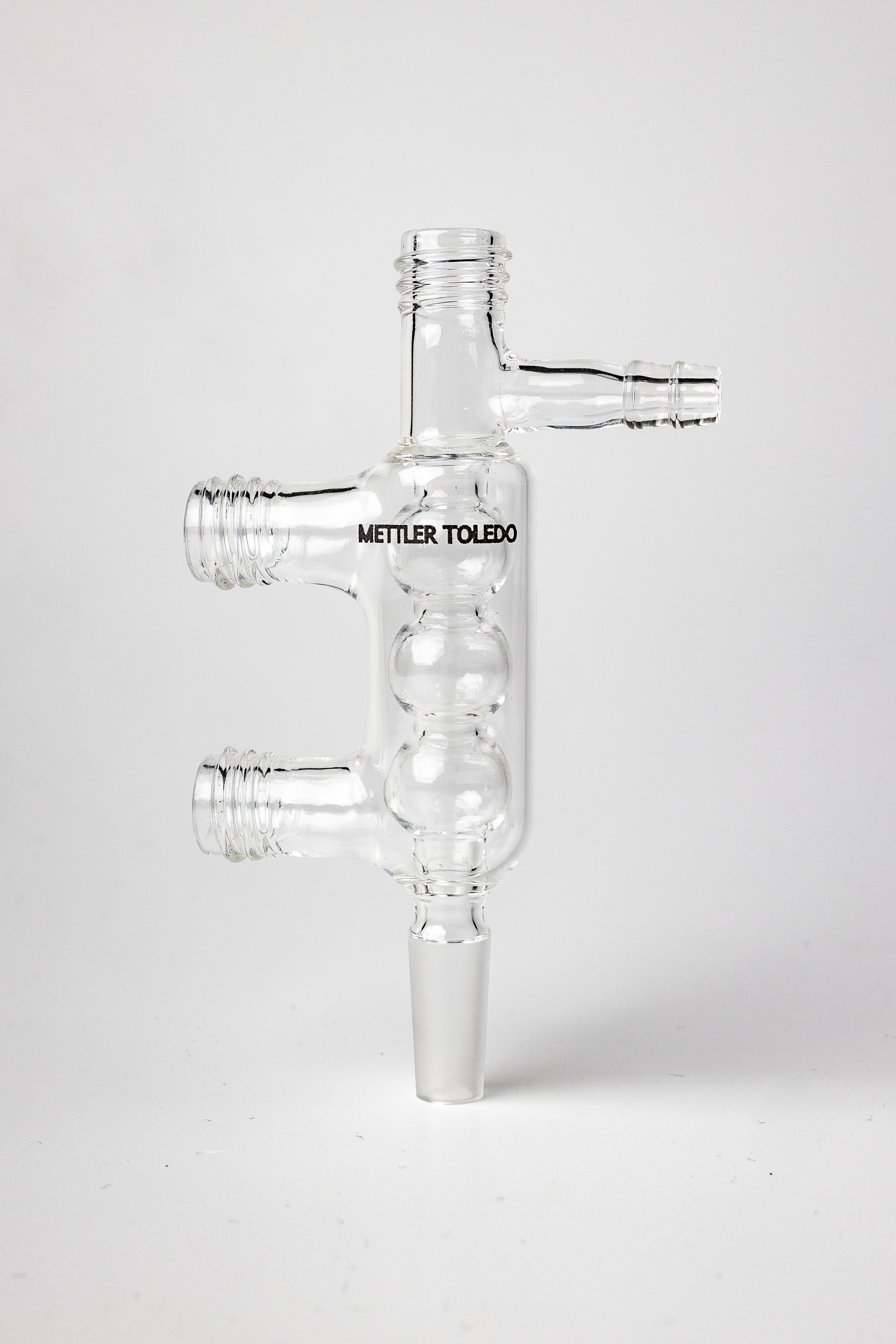
Laboratory reflux apparatus.

A mixture of reactants and solvent is placed in a suitable vessel, such as a round bottom flask. This vessel is connected to a water-cooled condenser, which is typically open to the atmosphere at the top. The reaction vessel is heated in order to boil the reaction mixture; vapours produced from the mixture are condensed by the condenser, and return to the vessel through gravity. The purpose is to thermally accelerate the reaction by conducting it at an elevated, controlled temperature (i.e. the solvent's boiling point) and ambient pressure without losing large quantities of the mixture.

The diagram shows a typical reflux apparatus. It includes a water bath to indirectly heat the mixture. As many solvents used are flammable, direct heating with a Bunsen burner is not generally suitable, and alternatives such as a water bath, oil bath, sand bath, electric hot plate or heating mantle are employed.

== Reflux in laboratory distillation ==
Laboratory apparatus using reflux to supply energy to chemical reactions. An Erlenmeyer flask is used as a receiving flask, while a Liebig condenser is used to carry out the condensation. Here the distillation head and fractionating column are combined in one piece.

The apparatus shown in the diagram represents a batch distillation as opposed to a continuous distillation. The liquid feed mixture to be distilled is placed into the round-bottomed flask along with a few anti-bumping granules, and the fractionating column is fitted into the top. As the mixture is heated and boils, vapor rises up the column. The vapor condenses on the glass platforms (known as plates or trays) inside the column and runs back down into the liquid below, thereby refluxing the upflowing distillate vapor. The hottest tray is at the bottom of the column and the coolest tray is at the top. At steady state conditions, the vapor and liquid on each tray is at equilibrium. Only the most volatile of the vapors stays in gaseous form all the way to the top. The vapor at the top of the column then passes into the condenser, where it cools until it condenses into a liquid. The separation can be enhanced with the addition of more trays (to a practical limitation of heat, flow, etc.). The process continues until all the most volatile components in the liquid feed boil out of the mixture. This point can be recognized by the rise in temperature shown on the thermometer. For continuous distillation, the feed mixture enters in the middle of the column.

== Reflux in beverage distillation ==
By controlling the temperature of the condenser, often called a dephlegmator, a reflux still may be used to ensure that higher boiling point components are returned to the flask while lighter elements are passed out to a secondary condenser. This is useful in producing high quality alcoholic beverages, while ensuring that less desirable components (such as fusel alcohols) are returned to the primary flask. For high quality neutral spirits (such as vodka), or post distillation flavored spirits (gin, absinthe), a process of multiple distillations or charcoal filtering may be applied to obtain a product lacking in any suggestion of its original source material for fermentation. The geometry of the still also plays a role in determining how much reflux occurs. In a pot still, if the tube leading from the boiler to the condenser, the lyne arm, is angled upward, more liquid will have a chance to condense and flow back into the boiler leading to increased reflux. Typical results can increase production as high as 50% over the basic worm type condenser. The addition of a copper "boiling ball" in the path creates an area where expansion of gasses into the ball causes cooling and subsequent condensation and reflux. In a column still, the addition of inert materials in the column (e.g., packing) creates surfaces for early condensation and leads to increased reflux.

== Gallery ==
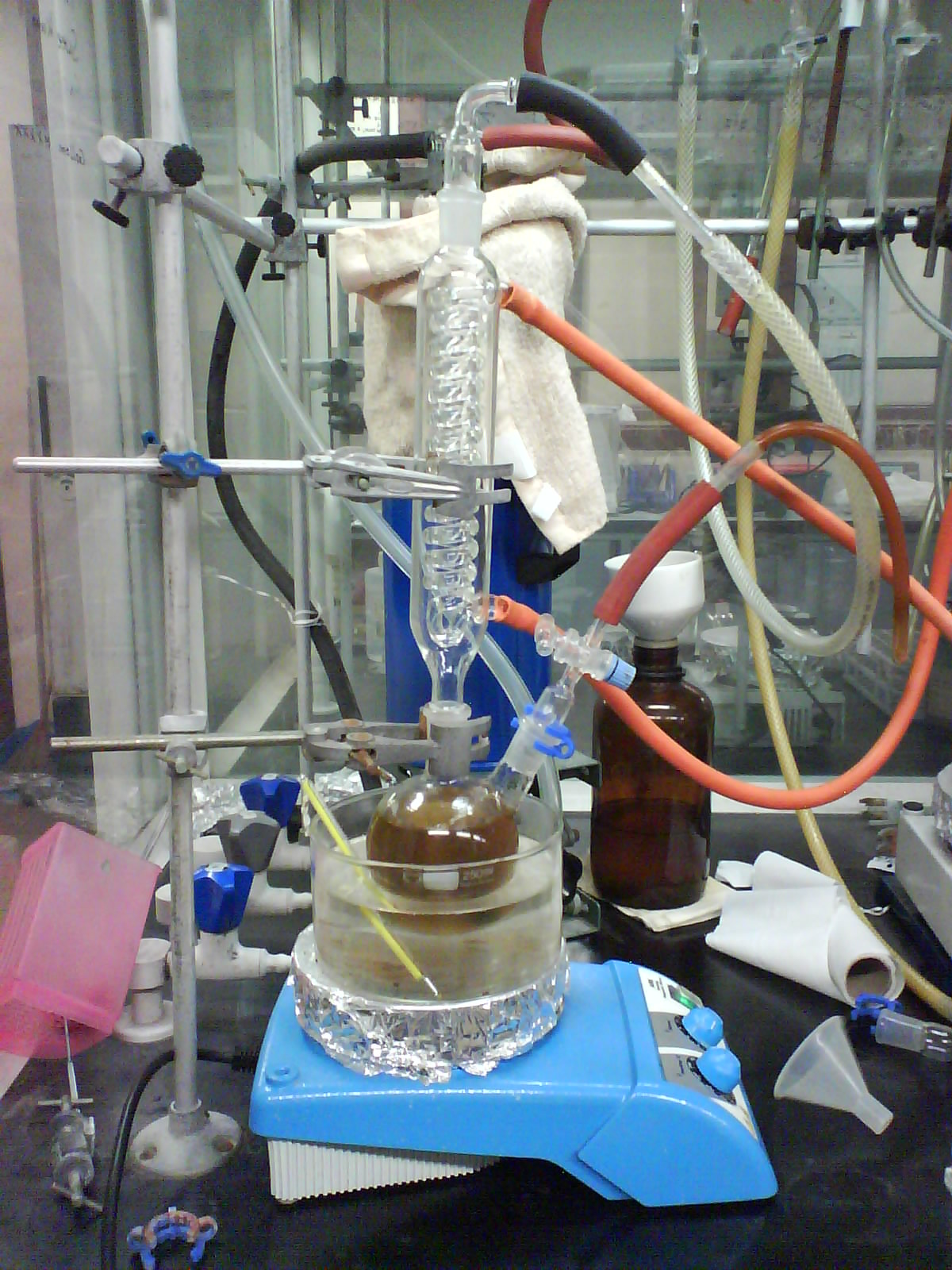
Toluene is refluxed with sodium-benzophenone desiccant before it is distilled to give pure oxygen- and water-free toluene.

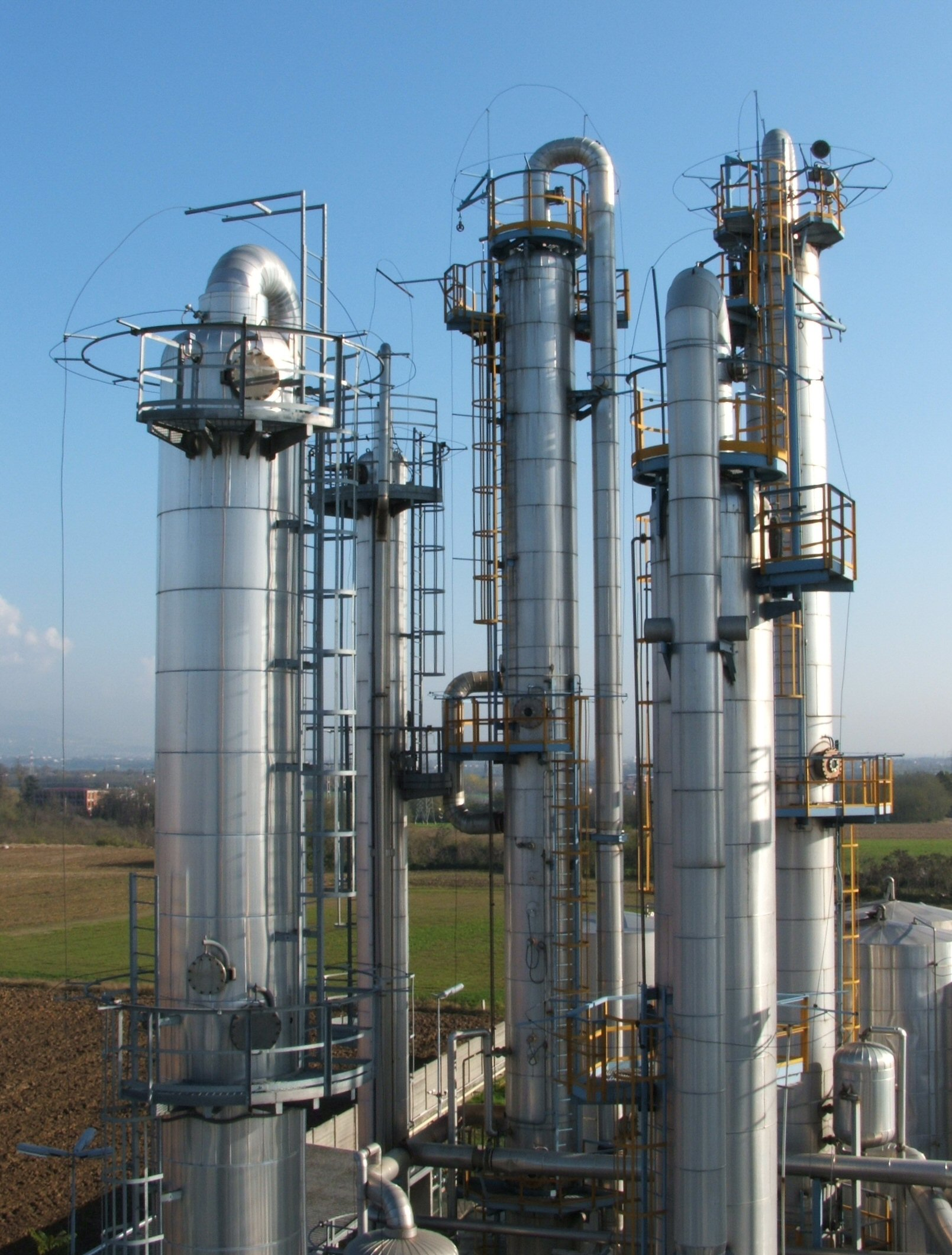
Industrial fractionating columns all of which use reflux

Organic synthesis apparatus using reflux

== See also ==
- Batch distillation
- Fractional distillation
- Fractionating column
- McCabe-Thiele method
