= DePriester chart =

Physical chemistry method for gas-liquid equilibrium determination

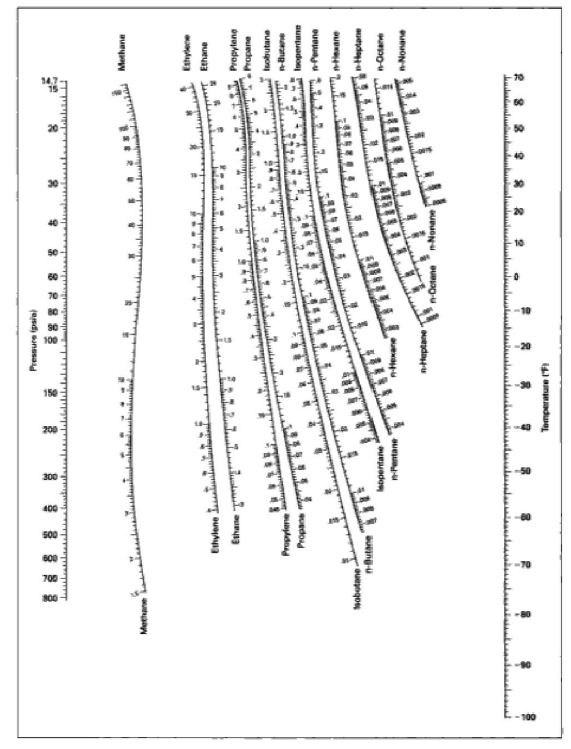
A DePriester Chart

DePriester Charts provide an efficient method to find the vapor-liquid equilibrium ratios for different substances at different conditions of pressure and temperature. The original chart was put forth by C.L. DePriester in an article in Chemical Engineering Progress in 1953. These nomograms have two vertical coordinates, one for pressure, and another for temperature. "K" values, representing the tendency of a given chemical species to partition itself preferentially between liquid and vapor phases, are plotted in between. Many DePriester charts have been printed for simple hydrocarbons.

== Example ==
For example, to find the K value of methane at 100 psia and 60 °F.

1. On the left-hand vertical axis, locate and mark the point containing the pressure 100 psia.
2. On the right-hand vertical axis, locate and mark the point containing the temperature 60°F.
3. Connect the points with a straight line.
4. Note where the line crosses the methane axis. Read this K-value off the chart (approximately 21.3).
