= McCabe–Thiele method =

Chemical engineering technique

The McCabe–Thiele method is a technique that is commonly employed in the field of chemical engineering to model the separation of two substances by a distillation column. It uses the fact that the composition at each theoretical tray is completely determined by the mole fraction of one of the two components. This method is based on the assumptions that the distillation column is isobaric—i.e the pressure remains constant—and that the flow rates of liquid and vapor do not change throughout the column (i.e., constant molar overflow). The assumption of constant molar overflow requires that:

- The heat needed to vaporize a certain amount of liquid of the feed components are equal,
- For every mole of liquid vaporized, a mole of vapor is condensed, and
- Heat effects such as heat needed to dissolve the substance(s) are negligible.

The method was first published by Warren L. McCabe and Ernest Thiele in 1925, both of whom were working at the Massachusetts Institute of Technology (MIT) at the time.

== Construction and use ==
A McCabe–Thiele diagram for the distillation of a binary (two-component) feed is constructed using the vapor-liquid equilibrium (VLE) data—which is how vapor is concentrated when in contact with its liquid form—for the component with the lower boiling point.

Figure 1: Typical McCabe–Thiele diagram for distillation of a binary feed

On a planar graph, both axes represent the mole fractions of the lighter (lower boiling) component; the horizontal (x) and vertical (y) axes represents the liquid and vapor phase compositions, respectively. The x = y line (see Figure 1) represents the scenarios where the compositions of liquid and vapor are the same. The vapor-liquid equilibrium line (the curved line from (0,0) to (1,1) in Figure 1) represents the vapor phase composition for a given liquid phase composition at equilibrium. Vertical lines drawn from the horizontal axis up to the x = y line indicate the composition of the inlet feed stream, the composition of the top (distillate) product stream, and the composition of the bottoms product (shown in red in Figure 1).

The rectifying section operating line for the section above the inlet feed stream of the distillation column (shown in green in Figure 1) starts at the intersection of the distillate composition line and the x = y line and continues at a downward slope of L / (D + L), where L is the molar flow rate of reflux and D is the molar flow rate of the distillate product, until it intersects the q-line.

The stripping section operating line for the section below the feed inlet (shown in magenta in Figure 1) starts at the intersection of the red bottoms composition line and the x = y line and continues up to the point where the blue q-line intersects the green rectifying section operating line.

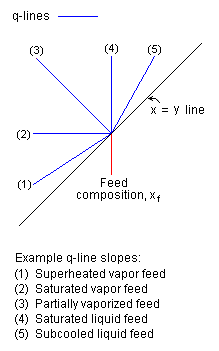
Figure 2: Examples of q-line slopes

The q-line (depicted in blue in Figure 1) intersects the point of intersection of the feed composition line and the x = y line and has a slope of q / (q - 1), where the parameter q denotes mole fraction of liquid in the feed. For example, if the feed is a saturated liquid, q = 1 and the slope of the q-line is infinite (drawn as a vertical line). As another example, if the feed is saturated vapor, q = 0 and the slope of the q-line is 0 (a horizontal line). The typical McCabe–Thiele diagram in Figure 1 uses a q-line representing a partially vaporized feed. Example q-line slopes are presented in Figure 2.

The number of steps between the operating lines and the equilibrium line represents the number of theoretical plates (or equilibrium stages) required for the distillation. For the binary distillation depicted in Figure 1, the required number of theoretical plates is 6.

Constructing a McCabe–Thiele diagram is not always straightforward. In continuous distillation with a varying reflux ratio, the mole fraction of the lighter component in the top part of the distillation column will decrease as the reflux ratio decreases. Each new reflux ratio will alter the gradient of the rectifying section curve.

When the assumption of constant molar overflow is not valid, the operating lines will not be straight. Using mass and enthalpy balances in addition to vapor-liquid equilibrium data and enthalpy-concentration data, operating lines can be constructed using the Ponchon–Savarit method.

If the mixture can form an azeotrope, its vapor-liquid equilibrium line will cross the x = y line, preventing further separation no matter the number of theoretical plates.

== See also ==
- Fractional distillation
- Azeotropic distillation
- Batch distillation
