= Theoretical plate =

Hypothetical stage of matter

A theoretical plate in many separation processes is a hypothetical zone or stage in which two phases, such as the liquid and vapor phases of a substance, establish an equilibrium with each other. Such equilibrium stages may also be referred to as an equilibrium stage, ideal stage, or a theoretical tray. The performance of many separation processes depends on having series of equilibrium stages and is enhanced by providing more such stages. In other words, having more theoretical plates increases the efficiency of the separation process be it either a distillation, absorption, chromatographic, adsorption or similar process.

== Applications ==
The concept of theoretical plates and trays or equilibrium stages is used in the design of many different types of separation.

=== Distillation columns ===
The concept of theoretical plates in designing distillation processes has been discussed in many reference texts. Any physical device that provides good contact between the vapor and liquid phases present in industrial-scale distillation columns or laboratory-scale glassware distillation columns constitutes a "plate" or "tray". Since an actual, physical plate can never be a 100% efficient equilibrium stage, the number of actual plates is more than the required theoretical plates.

$$N_a = \frac{N_t}{E}$$

where $N_a$ is the number of actual, physical plates or trays, $N_t$ is the number of theoretical plates or trays and $E$ is the plate or tray efficiency.

So-called bubble-cap or valve-cap trays are examples of the vapor and liquid contact devices used in industrial distillation columns. Another example of vapor and liquid contact devices are the spikes in laboratory Vigreux fractionating columns.

The trays or plates used in industrial distillation columns are fabricated of circular steel plates and usually installed inside the column at intervals of about 60 to 75 cm (24 to 30 inches) up the height of the column. That spacing is chosen primarily for ease of installation and ease of access for future repair or maintenance.

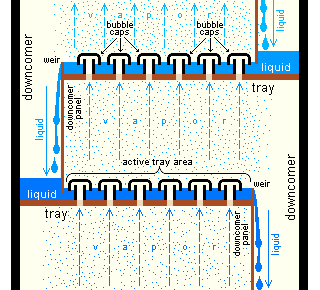
Typical bubble cap trays used in industrial distillation columns

An example of a very simple tray is a perforated tray. The desired contacting between vapor and liquid occurs as the vapor, flowing upwards through the perforations, comes into contact with the liquid flowing downwards through the perforations. In current modern practice, as shown in the adjacent diagram, better contacting is achieved by installing bubble-caps or valve caps at each perforation to promote the formation of vapor bubbles flowing through a thin layer of liquid maintained by a weir on each tray.

To design a distillation unit or a similar chemical process, the number of theoretical trays or plates (that is, hypothetical equilibrium stages), N_{t}, required in the process should be determined, taking into account a likely range of feedstock composition and the desired degree of separation of the components in the output fractions. In industrial continuous fractionating columns, N_{t} is determined by starting at either the top or bottom of the column and calculating material balances, heat balances and equilibrium flash vaporizations for each of the succession of equilibrium stages until the desired end product composition is achieved. The calculation process requires the availability of a great deal of vapor–liquid equilibrium data for the components present in the distillation feed, and the calculation procedure is very complex.

In an industrial distillation column, the N_{t} required to achieve a given separation also depends upon the amount of reflux used. Using more reflux decreases the number of plates required and using less reflux increases the number of plates required. Hence, the calculation of N_{t} is usually repeated at various reflux rates. N_{t} is then divided by the tray efficiency, E, to determine the actual number of trays or physical plates, N_{a}, needed in the separating column. The final design choice of the number of trays to be installed in an industrial distillation column is then selected based upon an economic balance between the cost of additional trays and the cost of using a higher reflux rate.

There is a very important distinction between the theoretical plate terminology used in discussing conventional distillation trays and the theoretical plate terminology used in the discussions below of packed bed distillation or absorption or in chromatography or other applications. The theoretical plate in conventional distillation trays has no "height". It is simply a hypothetical equilibrium stage. However, the theoretical plate in packed beds, chromatography and other applications is defined as having a height.

The empirical formula known as Van Winkle's Correlation can be used to predict the Murphree plate efficiency for distillation columns separating binary systems.

=== Distillation and absorption packed beds ===
Distillation and absorption separation processes using packed beds for vapor and liquid contacting have an equivalent concept referred to as the plate height or the height equivalent to a theoretical plate (HETP). HETP arises from the same concept of equilibrium stages as does the theoretical plate and is numerically equal to the absorption bed length divided by the number of theoretical plates in the absorption bed (and in practice is measured in this way).

$$N_t = \frac{H}\mathrm{HETP}$$

where $N_t$ is the number of theoretical plates (also called the "plate count"), H is the total bed height and HETP is the height equivalent to a theoretical plate.

The material in packed beds can either be random dumped packing (1-3" wide) such as Raschig rings or structured sheet metal. Liquids tend to wet the surface of the packing and the vapors contact the wetted surface, where mass transfer occurs.

=== Chromatographic processes ===
The theoretical plate concept was also adapted for chromatographic processes by Martin and Synge. The IUPAC's Gold Book provides a definition of the number of theoretical plates in a chromatography column.

The same equation applies in chromatography processes as for the packed bed processes, namely:

$$N_t = \frac{H}\mathrm{HETP}$$

In packed column chromatography, the HETP may also be calculated with the Van Deemter equation. In capillary column chromatography HETP is given by the Golay equation.

=== Other applications ===
The concept of theoretical plates or trays applies to other processes as well, such as capillary electrophoresis and some types of adsorption.

== See also ==
- Batch distillation
- Continuous distillation
- Extractive distillation
- Fenske equation
- Fractional distillation
- McCabe–Thiele method
