= Warren L. McCabe =

Warren Lee McCabe
- Born: August 7, 1899; Bay City, Michigan
- Died: August 24, 1982 (aged 83); Black Mountain, North Carolina
- Education: University of Michigan
- Known for: McCabe–Thiele method
- Awards: William H. Walker Award; Founder's Award; Warren K. Lewis Award U.S. Presidential Certificate of Merit; Golden Key Award
- Scientific career
- Fields: Chemical engineering

Warren Lee McCabe (August 7, 1899 – August 24, 1982) was an American Physical Chemist and is considered as one of the founding fathers of the profession of chemical engineering. He is widely known for the eponymous McCabe–Thiele method for analysis of distillation processes and his book, Unit Operations of Chemical Engineering, a major textbook.
