= Volatility (chemistry) =

Tendency of a substance to vaporize

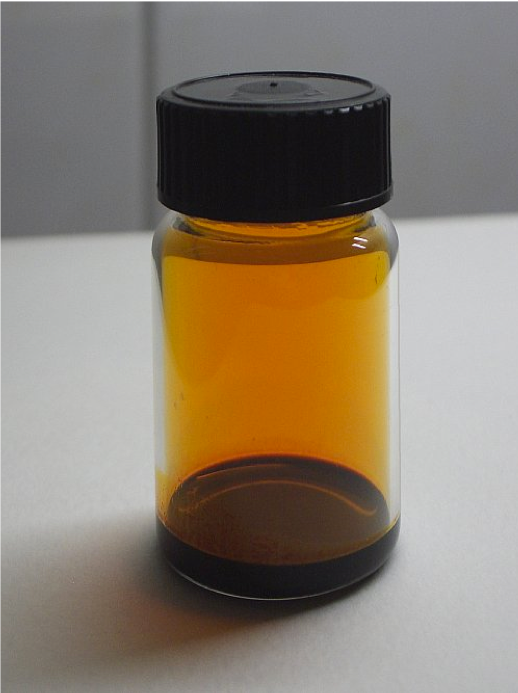
Bromine liquid readily transitions to vapor at room temperature, indicating high volatility.

In chemistry, volatility is a material quality which describes how readily a substance vaporizes. At a given temperature and pressure, a substance with high volatility is more likely to exist as a vapour, while a substance with low volatility is more likely to be a liquid or solid. Volatility can also describe the tendency of a vapor to condense into a liquid or solid; less volatile substances will more readily condense from a vapor than highly volatile ones. Differences in volatility can be observed by comparing how fast substances within a group evaporate (or sublimate in the case of solids) when exposed to the atmosphere. A highly volatile substance such as rubbing alcohol (isopropyl alcohol) will quickly evaporate, while a substance with low volatility such as vegetable oil will remain condensed. In general, solids are much less volatile than liquids, but there are some exceptions. Solids that sublimate (change directly from solid to vapor) such as dry ice (solid carbon dioxide) or iodine can vaporize at a similar rate as some liquids under standard conditions.

== Description ==
Volatility itself has no defined numerical value, but it is often described using vapor pressures or boiling points (for liquids). High vapor pressures indicate a high volatility, while high boiling points indicate low volatility. Vapor pressures and boiling points are often presented in tables and charts that can be used to compare chemicals of interest. Volatility data is typically found through experimentation over a range of temperatures and pressures.

=== Vapor pressure ===
A log-lin vapor pressure chart for various liquids

Vapor pressure is a measurement of how readily a condensed phase forms a vapor at a given temperature. A substance enclosed in a sealed vessel initially at vacuum (no air inside) will quickly fill any empty space with vapor. After the system reaches equilibrium and the rate of evaporation matches the rate of condensation, the vapor pressure can be measured. Increasing the temperature increases the amount of vapor that is formed and thus the vapor pressure. In a mixture, each substance contributes to the overall vapor pressure of the mixture, with more volatile compounds making a larger contribution.

=== Boiling point ===
Boiling point is the temperature at which the vapor pressure of a liquid is equal to the surrounding pressure, causing the liquid to rapidly evaporate, or boil. It is closely related to vapor pressure, but is dependent on pressure. The normal boiling point is the boiling point at atmospheric pressure, but it can also be reported at higher and lower pressures.

== Contributing factors ==
=== Intermolecular forces ===
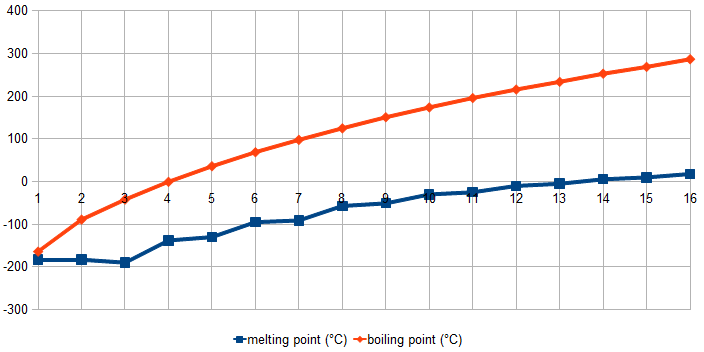
Normal boiling point (red) and melting point (blue) of linear alkanes vs. number of carbon atoms.

An important factor influencing a substance's volatility is the strength of the interactions between its molecules. Attractive forces between molecules are what holds materials together, and materials with stronger intermolecular forces, such as most solids, are typically not very volatile. Ethanol and dimethyl ether, two chemicals with the same formula (C_{2}H_{6}O), have different volatilities due to the different interactions that occur between their molecules in the liquid phase: ethanol molecules are capable of hydrogen bonding while dimethyl ether molecules are not. The result in an overall stronger attractive force between the ethanol molecules, making it the less volatile substance of the two.

=== Molecular weight ===
In general, volatility tends to decrease with increasing molecular mass because larger molecules can participate in more intermolecular bonding, although other factors such as structure and polarity play a significant role. The effect of molecular mass can be partially isolated by comparing chemicals of similar structure (i.e. esters, alkanes, etc.). For instance, linear alkanes exhibit decreasing volatility as the number of carbons in the chain increases.

== Applications ==
=== Distillation ===
A crude oil distillation tower.

Knowledge of volatility is often useful in the separation of components from a mixture. When a mixture of condensed substances contains multiple substances with different levels of volatility, its temperature and pressure can be manipulated such that the more volatile components change to a vapor while the less volatile substances remain in the liquid or solid phase. The newly formed vapor can then be discarded or condensed into a separate container. When the vapors are collected, this process is known as distillation.

The process of petroleum refinement utilizes a technique known as fractional distillation, which allows several chemicals of varying volatility to be separated in a single step. Crude oil entering a refinery is composed of many useful chemicals that need to be separated. The crude oil flows into a distillation tower and is heated up, which allows the more volatile components such as butane and kerosene to vaporize. These vapors move up the tower and eventually come in contact with cold surfaces, which causes them to condense and be collected. The most volatile chemical condense at the top of the column while the least volatile chemicals to vaporize condense in the lowest portion.

The difference in volatility between water and ethanol has long been used to produce concentrated alcoholic beverages (many of these are referred to as "liquors"). In order to increase the concentration of ethanol in the product, beverage makers would heat the initial alcohol mixture to a temperature where most of the ethanol vaporizes while most of the water remains liquid. The ethanol vapor is then collected and condensed in a separate container, resulting in a much more concentrated product.

=== Perfume ===
Volatility is an important consideration when crafting perfumes. Humans detect odors when aromatic vapors come in contact with receptors in the nose. Ingredients that vaporize quickly after being applied will produce fragrant vapors for a short time before the oils evaporate. Slow-evaporating ingredients can stay on the skin for weeks or even months, but may not produce enough vapors to produce a strong aroma. To prevent these problems, perfume designers carefully consider the volatility of essential oils and other ingredients in their perfumes. Appropriate evaporation rates are achieved by modifying the amount of highly volatile and non-volatile ingredients used.

=== Chemical weapons ===
Chemical weapons can be classified as persistent agents or nonpersistent agents dependent on volatility. The more volatile an agent, the faster it will evaporate and be dispersed and may only be a danger for a specific period of time. Persistent agents cause extended contamination and be used for area denial via contamination of the battlefield's choke points or rear. Volatile and nonpersistent chemical weapons including the early G-series nerve agents, including tabun, sarin, and soman. Less volatile and more persistent chemical weapons include mustard gas, the V-series nerve agents, including VX and VR, and the Novichok series nerve agents.

== See also ==
- Clausius–Clapeyron relation – Relation between vapour pressure and temperature
- Distillation – Method of separating mixtures
- Fractional distillation – Separation of a mixture into its component parts
- Partial pressure – Pressure of a component gas in a mixture
- Raoult's law – Law of thermodynamics for vapour pressure of a mixture
- Relative volatility – Comparative volatility of components in a solution
- Vapor–liquid equilibrium – Concentration of a vapor in contact with its liquid
- Volatile organic compound – Organic chemicals having a high vapor pressure at room temperature
