= Vapor–liquid equilibrium =

Concentration of a vapor in contact with its liquid

In thermodynamics and chemical engineering, the vapor–liquid equilibrium (VLE) describes the distribution of chemical species between the vapor phase and a liquid phase.

The concentration of a vapor in contact with its liquid, especially at equilibrium, is often expressed in terms of vapor pressure, which will be a partial pressure (a part of the total gas pressure) if any other gas(es) are present with the vapor. The equilibrium vapor pressure of a liquid is in general strongly dependent on temperature. At vapor–liquid equilibrium, a liquid with individual components in certain concentrations will have an equilibrium vapor in which the concentrations or partial pressures of the vapor components have certain values depending on all of the liquid component concentrations and the temperature. The converse is also true: if a vapor with components at certain concentrations or partial pressures is in vapor–liquid equilibrium with its liquid, then the component concentrations in the liquid will be determined dependent on the vapor concentrations and on the temperature. The equilibrium concentration of each component in the liquid phase is often different from its concentration (or vapor pressure) in the vapor phase, but there is a relationship. The VLE concentration data can be determined experimentally or approximated with the help of theories such as Raoult's law, Dalton's law, and Henry's law.

Such vapor–liquid equilibrium information is useful in designing columns for distillation, especially fractional distillation, which is a particular specialty of chemical engineers. Distillation is a process used to separate or partially separate components in a mixture by boiling (vaporization) followed by condensation. Distillation takes advantage of differences in concentrations of components in the liquid and vapor phases.

In mixtures containing two or more components, the concentrations of each component are often expressed as mole fractions. The mole fraction of a given component of a mixture in a particular phase (either the vapor or the liquid phase) is the number of moles of that component in that phase divided by the total number of moles of all components in that phase.

Binary mixtures are those having two components. Three-component mixtures are called ternary mixtures. There can be VLE data for mixtures with even more components, but such data is often hard to show graphically. VLE data is a function of the total pressure, such as 1 atm or at the pressure the process is conducted at.

When a temperature is reached such that the sum of the equilibrium vapor pressures of the liquid components becomes equal to the total pressure of the system (it is otherwise smaller), then vapor bubbles generated from the liquid begin to displace the gas that was maintaining the overall pressure, and the mixture is said to boil. This temperature is called the boiling point of the liquid mixture at the given pressure. (It is assumed that the total pressure is held steady by adjusting the total volume of the system to accommodate the specific volume changes that accompany boiling.) The boiling point at an overall pressure of 1 atm is called the normal boiling point of the liquid mixture.

== Thermodynamic description of vapor–liquid equilibrium ==
The field of thermodynamics describes when vapor–liquid equilibrium is possible, and its properties. Much of the analysis depends on whether the vapor and liquid consist of a single component, or if they are mixtures.

=== Pure (single-component) systems ===
If the liquid and vapor are pure, in that they consist of only one molecular component and no impurities, then the equilibrium state between the two phases is described by the following equations:

$$P^\text{liq} = P^\text{vap}\,$$;
$T^\text{liq} = T^\text{vap}$; and
$$\tilde{G}^\text{liq} = \tilde{G}^\text{vap}$$

where $P^\text{liq}$ and $P^\text{vap}$ are the pressures within the liquid and vapor, $T^\text{liq}$ and $T^\text{vap}$ are the temperatures within the liquid and vapor, and $\tilde{G}^\text{liq}$ and $\tilde{G}^\text{vap}$ are the molar Gibbs free energies (units of energy per amount of substance) within the liquid and vapor, respectively. In other words, the temperature, pressure and molar Gibbs free energy are the same between the two phases when they are at equilibrium.

An equivalent, more common way to express the vapor–liquid equilibrium condition in a pure system is by using the concept of fugacity. Under this view, equilibrium is described by the following equation:

$$f^\text{liq}(T_s,P_s) = f^\text{vap}(T_s,P_s)$$

where $f^\text{liq}(T_s,P_s)$and $f^\text{vap}(T_s,P_s)$are the fugacities of the liquid and vapor, respectively, at the system temperature T_{s} and pressure P_{s}. It is often convenient to use the quantity $\phi=f/P$, the dimensionless fugacity coefficient, which is 1 for an ideal gas.

=== Multicomponent systems ===
In a multicomponent system, where the vapor and liquid consist of more than one type of compounds, describing the equilibrium state is more complicated. For all components i in the system, the equilibrium state between the two phases is described by the following equations:

$$P^\text{liq} = P^\text{vap}$$;
$T^\text{liq} = T^\text{vap}$; and
$$\bar{G}_i^\text{liq} = \bar{G}_i^\text{vap}$$

where P and T are the temperature and pressure for each phase, and $\bar{G}_i^\text{liq}$ and $\bar{G}_i^\text{vap}$are the partial molar Gibbs free energy also called chemical potential (units of energy per amount of substance) within the liquid and vapor, respectively, for each phase. The partial molar Gibbs free energy is defined by:

$$\bar{G}_i \ \stackrel{\mathrm{def}}{=}\   \frac{\partial G}{\partial n_i}$$

where G is the (extensive) Gibbs free energy, and n_{i} is the amount of substance of component i.

== Boiling-point diagrams ==
Binary mixture VLE data at a certain overall pressure, such as 1 atm, showing mole fraction vapor and liquid concentrations when boiling at various temperatures can be shown as a two-dimensional graph called a boiling-point diagram. The mole fraction of component 1 in the mixture can be represented by the symbol x_{1}. The mole fraction of component 2, represented by x_{2}, is related to x_{1} in a binary mixture as follows:

x_{1} + x_{2} = 1

In multi-component mixtures in general with n components, this becomes:

x_{1} + x_{2} + ⋯ + x_{n} = 1

Boiling-point diagram

The preceding equilibrium equations are typically applied for each phase (liquid or vapor) individually, but the result can be plotted in a single diagram. In a binary boiling-point diagram, temperature (T ) (or sometimes pressure) is graphed vs. x_{1}. At any given temperature (or pressure) where both phases are present, vapor with a certain mole fraction is in equilibrium with liquid with a certain mole fraction. The two mole fractions often differ. These vapor and liquid mole fractions are represented by two points on the same horizontal isotherm (constant T ) line. When an entire range of temperatures vs. vapor and liquid mole fractions is graphed, two (usually curved) lines result. The lower one, representing the mole fraction of the boiling liquid at various temperatures, is called the bubble point curve. The upper one, representing the mole fraction of the vapor at various temperatures, is called the dew point curve.

These two curves necessarily meet where the mixture becomes purely one component, namely where x_{1} = 0 (and x_{2} = 1, pure component 2) or x_{1} = 1 (and x_{2} = 0, pure component 1). The temperatures at those two points correspond to the boiling points of each of the two pure components.

For certain pairs of substances, the two curves also coincide at some point strictly between x_{1} = 0 and x_{1} = 1. When they meet, they meet tangently; the dew-point temperature always lies above the boiling-point temperature for a given composition when they are not equal. The meeting point is called an azeotrope for that particular pair of substances. It is characterized by an azeotrope temperature and an azeotropic composition, often expressed as a mole fraction. There can be maximum-boiling azeotropes, where the azeotrope temperature is at a maximum in the boiling curves, or minimum-boiling azeotropes, where the azeotrope temperature is at a minimum in the boiling curves.

If one wants to represent a VLE data for a three-component mixture as a boiling point "diagram", a three-dimensional graph can be used. Two of the dimensions would be used to represent the composition mole fractions, and the third dimension would be the temperature. Using two dimensions, the composition can be represented as an equilateral triangle in which each corner represents one of the pure components. The edges of the triangle represent a mixture of the two components at each end of the edge. Any point inside the triangle represents the composition of a mixture of all three components. The mole fraction of each component would correspond to where a point lies along a line starting at that component's corner and perpendicular to the opposite edge. The bubble point and dew point data would become curved surfaces inside a triangular prism, which connect the three boiling points on the vertical temperature "axes". Each face of this triangular prism would represent a two-dimensional boiling-point diagram for the corresponding binary mixture. Due to their three-dimensional complexity, such boiling-point diagrams are rarely seen. Alternatively, the three-dimensional curved surfaces can be represented on a two-dimensional graph by the use of curved isotherm lines at graduated intervals, similar to iso-altitude lines on a map. Two sets of such isotherm lines are needed on such a two-dimensional graph: one set for the bubble point surface and another set for the dew point surface.

=== K values and relative volatility values ===
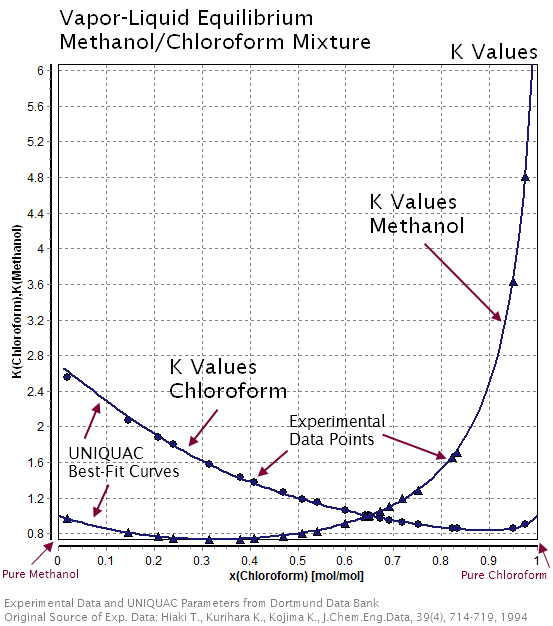
K Values Diagram (with UNIQUAC Best-Fit Curve), Mixture of Chloroform/Methanol

The tendency of a given chemical species to partition itself preferentially between liquid and vapor phases is the Henry's law constant. There can be VLE data for mixtures of four or more components, but such a boiling-point diagram is hard to show in either tabular or graphical form. For such multi-component mixtures, as well as binary mixtures, the vapor–liquid equilibrium data are represented in terms of K values (vapor–liquid distribution ratios) defined by

$$K_i=\frac {y_i}{x_i}$$

where y_{i} and x_{i} are the mole fractions of component i in the phases y and x respectively.

For Raoult's law

$$K_i=\frac {P_i^{\star}}P$$

For modified Raoult's law

$$K_i=\frac {\gamma_iP_i^{\star}}P$$

where $\gamma_i$ is the activity coefficient, P_{i} is the partial pressure and P is the pressure.

The values of the ratio K_{i} are correlated empirically or theoretically in terms of temperature, pressure and phase compositions in the form of equations, tables or graph such as the DePriester charts.

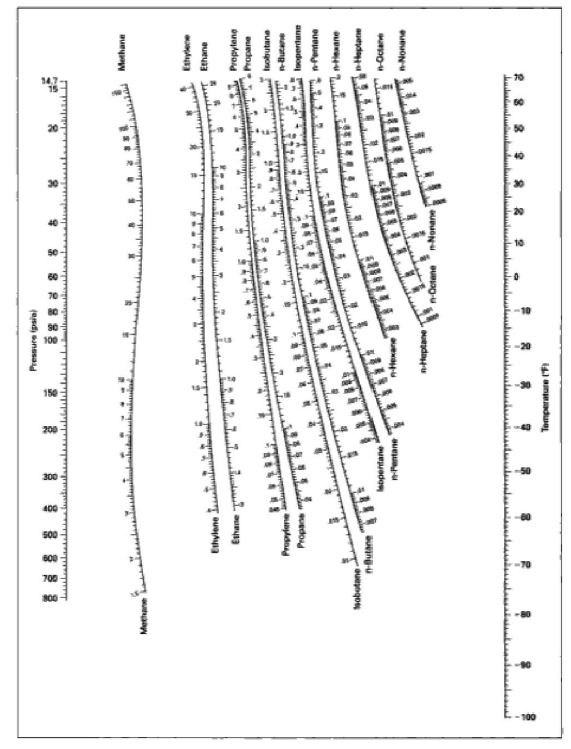
K-Values for systems of light hydrocarbons Low Temperature Range

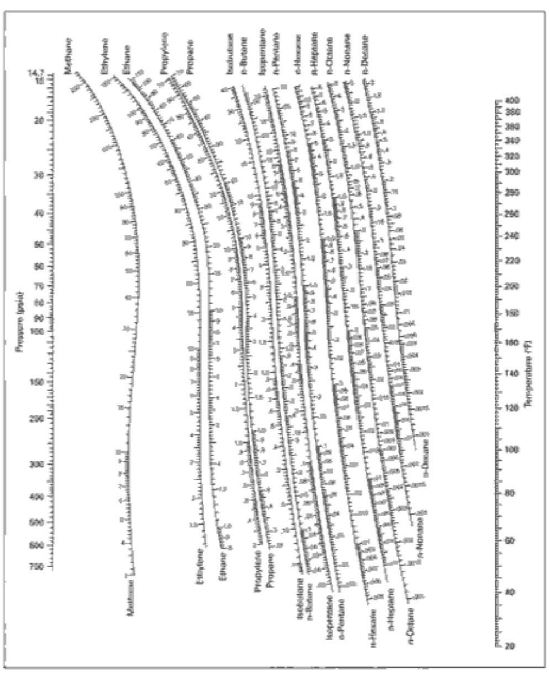
K-Values for systems of light hydrocarbons High Temperature Range

For binary mixtures, the ratio of the K values for the two components is called the relative volatility denoted by α

$$\alpha=\frac {K_i}{K_j}=\frac {(y_i/x_i)}{(y_j/x_j)}$$

which is a measure of the relative ease or difficulty of separating the two components. Large-scale industrial distillation is rarely undertaken if the relative volatility is less than 1.05 with the volatile component being i and the less volatile component being j.

K values are widely used in the design calculations of continuous distillation columns for distilling multicomponent mixtures.

== Vapor–liquid equilibrium diagrams ==
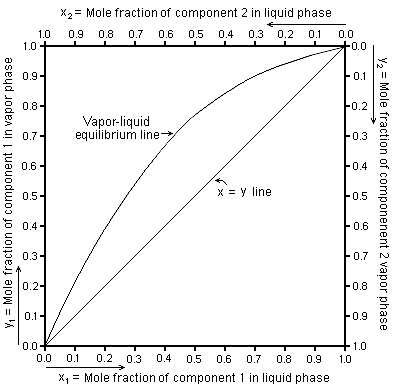
Vapor-Liquid Equilibrium Diagram

For each component in a binary mixture, one could make a vapor–liquid equilibrium diagram. Such a diagram would graph liquid mole fraction on a horizontal axis and vapor mole fraction on a vertical axis. In such VLE diagrams, liquid mole fractions for components 1 and 2 can be represented as x_{1} and x_{2} respectively, and vapor mole fractions of the corresponding components are commonly represented as y_{1} and y_{2}. Similarly for binary mixtures in these VLE diagrams:
$$\begin{align}
x_1 + x_2 &= 1 \\
y_1 + y_2 &= 1
\end{align}$$

Such VLE diagrams are square with a diagonal line running from the (x_{1} = 0, y_{1} = 0) corner to the (x_{1} = 1, y_{1} = 1) corner for reference.

These types of VLE diagrams are used in the McCabe–Thiele method to determine the number of equilibrium stages (or theoretical plates) needed to distill a given composition binary feed mixture into one distillate fraction and one bottoms fraction. Corrections can also be made to take into account the incomplete efficiency of each tray in a distillation column when compared to a theoretical plate.

== Raoult's law ==
At boiling and higher temperatures the sum of the individual component partial pressures becomes equal to the overall pressure, which can symbolized as P_{tot}.

Under such conditions, Dalton's law would be in effect as follows:
$$P_\text{tot} = P_1 + P_2 + \cdots$$

Then for each component in the vapor phase:
$$y_1 = \frac{P_1}{P_\text{tot}}, \quad y_2 = \frac{P_2}{P_\text{tot}}, \quad \cdots$$

where P_{1} = partial pressure of component 1, P_{2} = partial pressure of component 2, etc.

Raoult's law is approximately valid for mixtures of components between which there is very little interaction other than the effect of dilution by the other components. Examples of such mixtures includes mixtures of alkanes, which are non-polar, relatively inert compounds in many ways, so there is little attraction or repulsion between the molecules. Raoult's law states that for components 1, 2, etc. in a mixture:

$$P_1 = x_1 P^\circ_1, \quad P_2 = x_2 P^\circ_2, \quad \cdots$$

where P_{1}°, P_{2}°, etc. are the vapor pressures of components 1, 2, etc. when they are pure, and x_{1}, x_{2}, etc. are mole fractions of the corresponding component in the liquid.

Recall from the first section that vapor pressures of liquids are very dependent on temperature. Thus the P° pure vapor pressures for each component are a function of temperature (T): For example, commonly for a pure liquid component, the Clausius–Clapeyron relation may be used to approximate how the vapor pressure varies as a function of temperature. This makes each of the partial pressures dependent on temperature also regardless of whether Raoult's law applies or not. When Raoult's law is valid these expressions become:
$$P_1 T = x_1 P^\circ_1 T, \quad P_2 T = x_2 P^\circ_2 T, \quad \cdots$$

At boiling temperatures if Raoult's law applies, the total pressure becomes:
$$P_\text{tot} = x_1 P^\circ_1 T + x_2 P^\circ_2 T + \cdots$$

At a given P_{tot} such as 1 atm and a given liquid composition, T can be solved for to give the liquid mixture's boiling point or bubble point, although the solution for T may not be mathematically analytical (i.e., may require a numerical solution or approximation). For a binary mixture at a given P_{tot}, the bubble point T can become a function of x_{1} (or x_{2}) and this function can be shown on a two-dimensional graph like a binary boiling point diagram.

At boiling temperatures if Raoult's law applies, a number of the preceding equations in this section can be combined to give the following expressions for vapor mole fractions as a function of liquid mole fractions and temperature:
$$y_1 = x_1 \frac{P^\circ_1 T}{P_\text{tot}}, \quad y_2 = x_2 \frac{P^\circ_2 T}{P_\text{tot}}, \quad \cdots$$

Once the bubble point T's as a function of liquid composition in terms of mole fractions have been determined, these values can be inserted into the above equations to obtain corresponding vapor compositions in terms of mole fractions. When this is finished over a complete range of liquid mole fractions and their corresponding temperatures, one effectively obtains a temperature T function of vapor composition mole fractions. This function effectively acts as the dew point T function of vapor composition.

In the case of a binary mixture, x_{2} = 1 − x_{1} and the above equations can be expressed as:
$$\begin{align}
y_1 &= x_1 \frac{P^\circ_1 T}{P_\text{tot}} \\
y_2 &= (1 - x_1) \frac{P^\circ_2 T}{P_\text{tot}}
\end{align}$$

For many kinds of mixtures, particularly where there is interaction between components beyond simply the effects of dilution, Raoult's law does not work well for determining the shapes of the curves in the boiling point or VLE diagrams. Even in such mixtures, there are usually still differences in the vapor and liquid equilibrium concentrations at most points, and distillation is often still useful for separating components at least partially. For such mixtures, empirical data is typically used in determining such boiling point and VLE diagrams. Chemical engineers have done a significant amount of research trying to develop equations for correlating and/or predicting VLE data for various kinds of mixtures which do not obey Raoult's law well.

== See also ==
- Continuous distillation
- Dortmund Data Bank (includes a collection of VLE data)
- Fenske equation
- Flash evaporation
- DECHEMA model
- Hand boiler
- Van Laar equation
- Margules activity model
- Pervaporation
- Supercooling
- Superheated steam
