= Fractional distillation =

Separation of a mixture into its component parts

Fractional distillation is the separation of a mixture into its component parts, or fractions. Chemical compounds are separated by heating them to a temperature at which one or more fractions of the mixture will vaporize. It uses distillation to fractionate. Generally the component parts have boiling points that differ by less than 25 °C (45 °F) from each other under a pressure of one atmosphere. If the difference in boiling points is greater than 25 °C, a simple distillation is typically used.

A crude oil distillation unit uses fractional distillation in the process of refining crude oil.

== History ==
The fractional distillation of organic substances played an important role in the 9th-century works attributed to the Islamic alchemist Jabir ibn Hayyan, as for example in the Kitāb al-Sabʿīn ('The Book of Seventy'), translated into Latin by Gerard of Cremona under the title Liber de septuaginta. The Jabirian experiments with fractional distillation of animal and vegetable substances, and to a lesser degree also of mineral substances, formed the main topic of the De anima in arte alkimiae, an originally Arabic work falsely attributed to Avicenna that was translated into Latin and would go on to form the most important alchemical source for Roger Bacon (c. 1220–1292).

== Laboratory setup ==
Fractional distillation in a laboratory makes use of common laboratory glassware and apparatuses, typically including a heat source such as a heating mantle or hot plate and sand bath (almost never an open flame as shown in the illustration, since a large majority of organic reagents are highly flammable), a round-bottomed flask and a condenser, as well as the single-purpose fractionating column.

Fractional distillation

The apparatus is assembled as in the diagram. (The diagram represents a batch apparatus as opposed to a continuous apparatus.) The mixture is put into the round-bottomed flask along with a few anti-bumping granules (or a Teflon-coated magnetic stirrer bar if using magnetic stirring), and the fractionating column is fitted into the top. The fractional distillation column is set up with the heat source at the bottom of the still pot.

As the distance from the still pot increases, a temperature gradient is formed in the column; it is coolest at the top and hottest at the bottom. As the mixed vapor ascends the temperature gradient, some of the vapor condenses and vaporizes along the temperature gradient. Each time the vapor condenses and vaporizes, the composition of the more volatile component in the vapor increases and the less volatile component increasingly remains as liquid. At a certain point, the more volatile component will begin to condense through the condenser and come off at a significantly higher purity relative to the initial.

Efficiency can be greatly increased via the use of insulative techniques. At steady-state conditions, the vapor and liquid in each incremental zone along the column at equilibrium. These are conceptually similar to a series of simple distillation processes, termed theoretical plates.

The most volatile component of the mixture exits as a gas at the top of the column. The vapor at the top of the column then passes into the condenser, which cools it down until it liquefies. The separation gives a higher purity product with increasing number of theoretical plates (to a practical limitation of heat, flow, etc.) Initially, the condensate will consist mostly of the lower-boiling component, but when much of the lower-boiling component has been drawn off, the condensate becomes gradually richer in the higher-boiling component. The process continues until all the lower-boiling component boils out of the mixture. This point can be recognized by the sharp rise in temperature shown on the thermometer.

The explanation above reflects the theoretical way fractionation works. Normal laboratory fractionation columns will be simple glass tubes (often vacuum-jacketed, and sometimes internally silvered) filled with a packing, often small glass helices of 4 to 7 millimetres (0.16 to 0.28 in) diameter. Such a column can be calibrated by the distillation of a known mixture system to quantify the column in terms of number of theoretical plates. To improve fractionation the apparatus is set up to return condensate to the column by the use of some sort of reflux splitter (reflux wire, gago, Magnetic swinging bucket, etc.) – a typical careful fractionation would employ a reflux ratio of around 4:1 (4 parts returned condensate to 1 part condensate take off).

In laboratory distillation, several types of condensers are commonly found. The Liebig condenser is simply a straight tube within a water jacket and is the simplest (and relatively least expensive) form of condenser. The Graham condenser is a spiral tube within a water jacket, and the Allihn condenser has a series of large and small constrictions on the inside tube, each increasing the surface area upon which the vapor constituents may condense.

Alternate set-ups may use a multi-outlet distillation receiver flask (referred to as a "cow" or "pig") to connect three or four receiving flasks to the condenser. By turning the cow or pig, the distillates can be channeled into any chosen receiver. Because the receiver does not have to be removed and replaced during the distillation process, this type of apparatus is useful when distilling under an inert atmosphere for air-sensitive chemicals or at reduced pressure. A Perkin triangle is an alternative apparatus often used in these situations because it allows isolation of the receiver from the rest of the system, but does require removing and reattaching a single receiver for each fraction.

Vacuum distillation systems operate at reduced pressure, thereby lowering the boiling points of the materials. Anti-bumping granules, however, become ineffective at reduced pressures.

Some mixtures cannot be completely purified by fractional distillation. As an example, consider the distillation of a mixture of water and ethanol. Ethanol boils at 78.4 °C (173.1 °F) while water boils at 100 °C (212 °F). In this case an azeotrope is also formed, where the mixture of 96% ethanol and 4% water boils at 78.2 °C (172.8 °F); even if this temperature weren't near enough to ethanol's own boiling to that it would be nearly impossible to fractionally separate the mixture, the first fraction would always come over as the 96/4 azeotrope. In these cases, azeotropic distillation or another method must be used instead.

== Industrial distillation ==
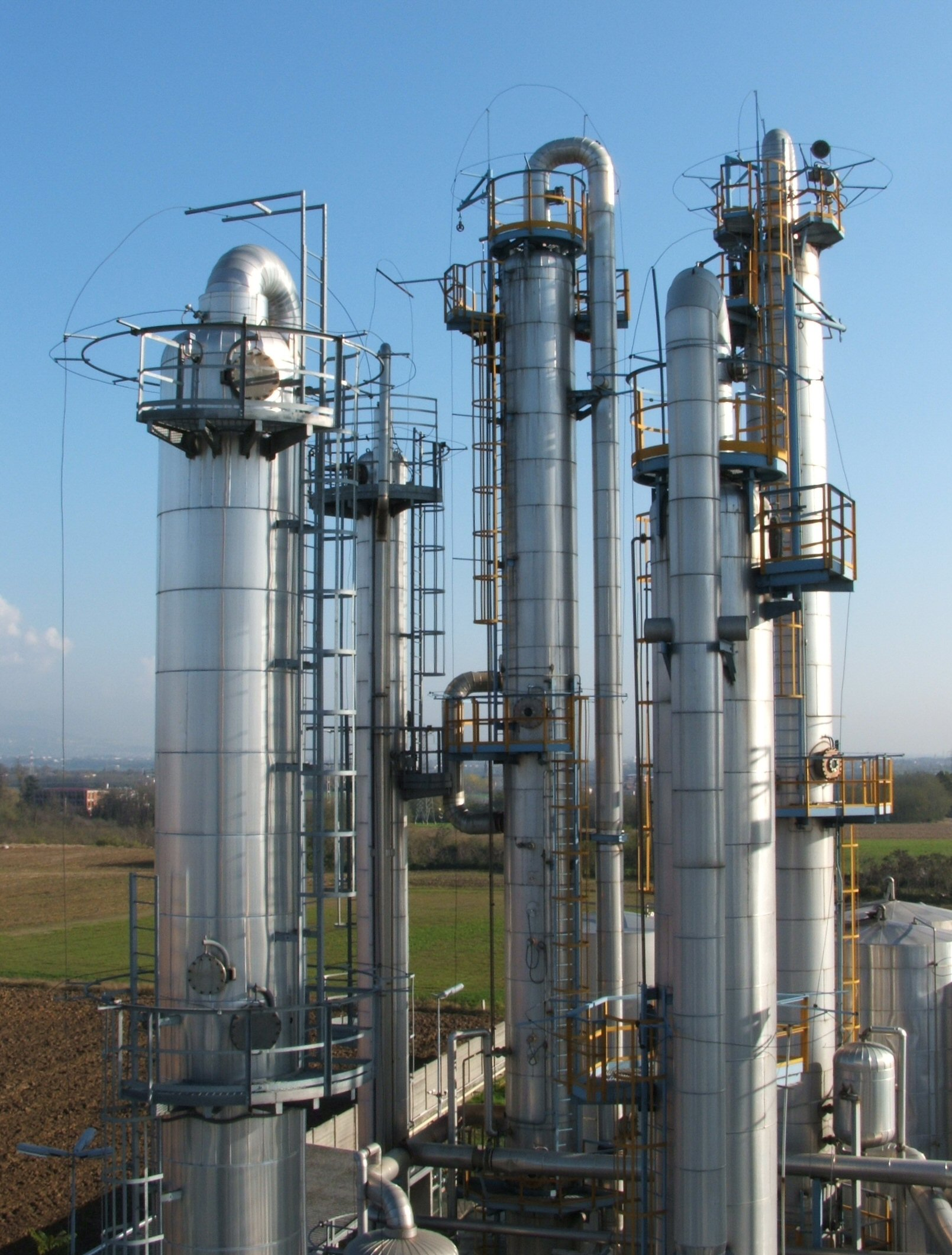
Typical industrial fractional distillation columns

Fractional distillation is the most common form of separation technology used in petroleum refineries, petrochemical and chemical plants, natural gas processing and cryogenic air separation plants. In most cases, the distillation is operated at a continuous steady state. New feed is always being added to the distillation column and products are always being removed. Unless the process is disturbed due to changes in feed, heat, ambient temperature, or condensing, the amount of feed being added and the amount of product being removed are normally equal. This is known as continuous, steady-state fractional distillation.

Industrial distillation is typically performed in large, vertical cylindrical columns known as "distillation or fractionation towers" or "distillation columns" with diameters ranging from about 0.65 to 6 meters (2 to 20 ft) and heights ranging from about 6 to 60 meters (20 to 197 ft) or more. The distillation towers have liquid outlets at intervals up the column which allow for the withdrawal of different fractions or products having different boiling points or boiling ranges. By increasing the temperature of the product inside the columns, the different products are separated. The "lightest" products (those with the lowest boiling point) exit from the top of the columns and the "heaviest" products (those with the highest boiling point) exit from the bottom of the column.

For example, fractional distillation is used in oil refineries to separate crude oil into useful substances (or fractions) having different hydrocarbons of different boiling points. The crude oil fractions with higher boiling points:

- have more carbon atoms
- have higher molecular weights
- are less branched-chain alkanes
- are darker in color
- are more viscous
- are more difficult to ignite and to burn

Diagram of a typical industrial distillation tower

Large-scale industrial towers use reflux to achieve a more complete separation of products. Reflux refers to the portion of the condensed overhead liquid product from a distillation or fractionation tower that is returned to the upper part of the tower as shown in the schematic diagram of a typical, large-scale industrial distillation tower. Inside the tower, the reflux liquid flowing downwards provides the cooling needed to condense the vapors flowing upwards, thereby increasing the effectiveness of the distillation tower. The more reflux is provided for a given number of theoretical plates, the better the tower's separation of lower boiling materials from higher boiling materials. Alternatively, the more reflux provided for a given desired separation, the fewer theoretical plates are required.

Crude oil is separated into fractions by fractional distillation. The fractions at the top of the fractionating column have lower boiling points than the fractions at the bottom. All of the fractions are processed further in other refining units.

Fractional distillation is also used in air separation, producing liquid oxygen, liquid nitrogen, and highly concentrated argon. Distillation of chlorosilanes also enable the production of high-purity silicon for use as a semiconductor.

In industrial uses, sometimes a packing material is used in the column instead of trays, especially when low-pressure drops across the column are required, as when operating under vacuum. This packing material can either be random dumped packing (1–3 in (25–76 mm) wide) such as Raschig rings or structured sheet metal. Typical manufacturers are Koch, Sulzer, and other companies. Liquids tend to wet the surface of the packing and the vapors pass across this wetted surface, where mass transfer takes place. Unlike conventional tray distillation in which every tray represents a separate point of vapor liquid equilibrium the vapor-liquid equilibrium curve in a packed column is continuous. However, when modeling packed columns it is useful to compute several "theoretical plates" to denote the separation efficiency of the packed column concerning more traditional trays. Differently shaped packings have different surface areas and porosity. Both of these factors affect packing performance.

=== Design of industrial distillation columns ===
Chemical engineering schematic of typical bubble-cap trays in a distillation tower

Design and operation of a distillation column depends on the feed and desired products. Given a simple, binary component feed, analytical methods such as the McCabe–Thiele method or the Fenske equation can be used. For a multi-component feed, simulation models are used both for design and operation.

Moreover, the efficiencies of the vapor-liquid contact devices (referred to as plates or trays) used in distillation columns are typically lower than that of a theoretical 100% efficient equilibrium stage. Hence, a distillation column needs more plates than the number of theoretical vapor-liquid equilibrium stages.

Reflux refers to the portion of the condensed overhead product that is returned to the tower. The reflux flowing downwards provides the cooling required for condensing the vapors flowing upwards. The reflux ratio, which is the ratio of the (internal) reflux to the overhead product, is conversely related to the theoretical number of stages required for efficient separation of the distillation products. Fractional distillation towers or columns are designed to achieve the required separation efficiently. The design of fractionation columns is normally made in two steps; a process design, followed by a mechanical design. The purpose of the process design is to calculate the number of required theoretical stages and stream flows including the reflux ratio, heat reflux, and other heat duties. The purpose of the mechanical design, on the other hand, is to select the tower internals, column diameter, and height. In most cases, the mechanical design of fractionation towers is not straightforward. For the efficient selection of tower internals and the accurate calculation of column height and diameter, many factors must be taken into account. Some of the factors involved in design calculations include feed load size and properties and the type of distillation column used.

The two major types of distillation columns used are tray and packing columns. Packing columns are normally used for smaller towers and loads that are corrosive or temperature-sensitive or for vacuum service where pressure drop is important. Tray columns, on the other hand, are used for larger columns with high liquid loads. They first appeared on the scene in the 1820s. In most oil refinery operations, tray columns are mainly used for the separation of petroleum fractions at different stages of oil refining.

In the oil refining industry, the design and operation of fractionation towers is still largely accomplished on an empirical basis. The calculations involved in the design of petroleum fractionation columns require in the usual practice the use of numerable charts, tables, and complex empirical equations. In recent years, however, a considerable amount of work has been done to develop efficient and reliable computer-aided design procedures for fractional distillation.

== See also ==
- Azeotropic distillation
- Batch distillation
- Extractive distillation
- Freeze distillation
- Steam distillation
