= Flash evaporation =

Partial vapor due to reduction in pressure

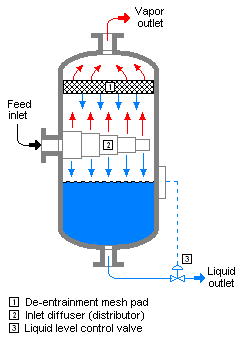
A typical flash drum

Flash evaporation (or partial evaporation) is the partial vapor that occurs when a saturated liquid stream undergoes a reduction in pressure by passing through a throttling valve or other throttling device. This process is one of the simplest unit operations. If the throttling valve or device is located at the entry into a pressure vessel so that the flash evaporation occurs within the vessel, then the vessel is often referred to as a flash drum.

If the saturated liquid is a single-component liquid (for example, propane or liquid ammonia), a part of the liquid immediately "flashes" into vapor. Both the vapor and the residual liquid are cooled to the saturation temperature of the liquid at the reduced pressure. This is often referred to as "auto-refrigeration" and is the basis of most conventional vapor compression refrigeration systems.

If the saturated liquid is a multi-component liquid (for example, a mixture of propane, isobutane and normal butane), the flashed vapor is richer in the more volatile components than is the remaining liquid.

Uncontrolled flash evaporation can result in a boiling liquid expanding vapor explosion (BLEVE).

== Flash evaporation of a single-component liquid ==
The flash evaporation of a single-component liquid is an isenthalpic process and is often referred to as an adiabatic flash. The following equation, derived from a simple heat balance around the throttling valve or device, is used to predict how much of a single-component liquid is vaporized.

$X = \frac{H_u^L - H_d^L}{H_d^V - H_d^L}$

where:
$X$	= weight ratio of vaporized liquid / total mass
$H_u^L$	= upstream liquid enthalpy at upstream temperature and pressure, J/kg
$H_d^V$	= flashed vapor enthalpy at downstream pressure and corresponding saturation temperature, J/kg
$H_d^L$	= residual liquid enthalpy at downstream pressure and corresponding saturation temperature, J/kg

If the enthalpy data required for the above equation is unavailable, then the following equation may be used.

$$X = \frac{c_p ( T_u - T_d )}{H_v}$$

where:
$X$	= weight fraction vaporized
$c_p$	= liquid specific heat at upstream temperature and pressure, J/(kg °C)
$T_u$	= upstream liquid temperature, °C
$T_d$	= liquid saturation temperature corresponding to the downstream pressure, °C
$H_v$	= liquid heat of vaporization at downstream pressure and corresponding saturation temperature, J/kg

Here, the words "upstream" and "downstream" refer to before and after the liquid passes through the throttling valve or device.

This type of flash evaporation is used in the desalination of brackish water or ocean water by "Multi-Stage Flash Distillation." The water is heated and then routed into a reduced-pressure flash evaporation "stage" where some of the water flashes into steam. This steam is subsequently condensed into salt-free water. The residual salty liquid from that first stage is introduced into a second flash evaporation stage at a pressure lower than the first stage pressure. More water is flashed into steam which is also subsequently condensed into more salt-free water. This sequential use of multiple flash evaporation stages is continued until the design objectives of the system are met. A large part of the world's installed desalination capacity uses multi-stage flash distillation. Typically such plants have 24 or more sequential stages of flash evaporation.

== Equilibrium flash of a multi-component liquid ==
The equilibrium flash of a multi-component liquid may be visualized as a simple distillation process using a single equilibrium stage. It is very different and more complex than the flash evaporation of single-component liquid. For a multi-component liquid, calculating the amounts of flashed vapor and residual liquid in equilibrium with each other at a given temperature and pressure requires a trial-and-error iterative solution. Such a calculation is commonly referred to as an equilibrium flash calculation. It involves solving the Rachford-Rice equation:

$$\sum_i\frac{z_i \, ( K_i -1)}{1 + \beta \, (K_i - 1)}=0$$

where:

- z_{i} is the mole fraction of component i in the feed liquid (assumed to be known);
- β is the fraction of feed that is vaporised;
- K_{i} is the equilibrium constant of component i.

The equilibrium constants K_{i} are in general functions of many parameters, though the most important is arguably temperature; they are defined as:

$$y_i = K_i \, x_i$$

where:

- x_{i} is the mole fraction of component i in liquid phase;
- y_{i} is the mole fraction of component i in gas phase.

Once the Rachford-Rice equation has been solved for β, the compositions x_{i} and y_{i} can be immediately calculated as:

$$\begin{align}
x_i &= \frac{z_i}{1+\beta(K_i-1)}\\
y_i &= K_i\,x_i.
\end{align}$$

The Rachford-Rice equation can have multiple solutions for β, at most one of which guarantees that all x_{i} and y_{i} will be positive. In particular, if there is only one β for which:

$$\frac{1}{1-K_\text{max}} = \beta_\text{min} < \beta < \beta_\text{max} = \frac{1}{1-K_\text{min}}$$

then that β is the solution; if there are multiple such β's, it means that either K_{max}<1 or K_{min}>1, indicating respectively that no gas phase can be sustained (and therefore β=0) or conversely that no liquid phase can exist (and therefore β=1).

It is possible to use Newton's method for solving the above water equation, but there is a risk of converging to the wrong value of β; it is important to initialise the solver to a sensible initial value, such as (β_{max}+β_{min})/2 (which is however not sufficient: Newton's method makes no guarantees on stability), or, alternatively, use a bracketing solver such as the bisection method or the Brent method, which are guaranteed to converge but can be slower.

The equilibrium flash of multi-component liquids is very widely utilized in petroleum refineries, petrochemical and chemical plants and natural gas processing plants.

== Contrast with spray drying ==
Spray drying is sometimes seen as a form of flash evaporation. However, although it is a form of liquid evaporation, it is quite different from flash evaporation.

In spray drying, a slurry of very small solids is rapidly dried by suspension in a hot gas. The slurry is first atomized into very small liquid droplets which are then sprayed into a stream of hot dry air. The liquid rapidly evaporates leaving behind dry powder or dry solid granules. The dry powder or solid granules are recovered from the exhaust air by using cyclones, bag filters or electrostatic precipitators.

== Natural flash evaporation ==
Natural flash vaporization or flash deposition may occur during earthquakes, resulting in deposition of minerals held in supersaturated solutions, sometimes including valuable ore in the case of auriferous (gold-bearing) waters. This results when blocks of rock are rapidly pulled and pushed away from each other by jog faults.

== See also ==
- Evaporator
- Vapor–liquid separator
- Multi-stage flash distillation
