= Clyssus =

Alchemical extract

In the pre-modern chemistry of Paracelsus, a clyssus, or clissus, was one of the effects, or productions of that art; consisting of the most efficacious principles of any body, extracted, purified, and then remixed.

Or, a clyssus is when the several constituents of a body are prepared and purified separately, and then combined again. Thus, the five principles, reassembled into one body, by long digestion, make a clyssus. So, clyssus of antimony is produced by distillation from antimony, nitre, and sulfur mixed together. There is also clyssus of vitriol, which is a spirit drawn by distillation from vitriol dissolved in vinegar; this was used by pre-modern physicians in treating various diseases, and to extract the tinctures of several vegetables.

Clyssus is used among some authors for a kind of sapa, or extract, made with eight parts of the juice of a plant, and one of sugar, seethed together into the consistency of honey.
