= Spinning cone =

Spinning cone columns are used in a form of low temperature vacuum steam distillation to gently extract volatile chemicals from liquid foodstuffs while minimising the effect on the taste of the product. For instance, the columns can be used to remove some of the alcohol from wine, to remove "off" smells from cream, and to capture aroma compounds that would otherwise be lost in coffee processing.

== Mechanism ==
The columns are made of stainless steel. Conical vanes are attached alternately to the wall of the column and to a central rotating shaft. The product is poured in at the top under vacuum, and steam is pumped into the column from below. The vanes provide a large surface area over which volatile compounds can evaporate into the steam, and the rotation ensures a thin layer of the product is constantly moved over the moving cone. It typically takes 20 seconds for the liquid to move through the column, and industrial columns might process 16–160 litres per minute (960–9,600 L/h; 4.2–42.3 US gal/min; 250–2,540 US gal/h). The temperature and pressure can be adjusted depending on the compounds targeted.

== Wine controversy ==
Improvements in viticulture and warmer vintages have led to increasing levels of sugar in wine grapes, which have translated to higher levels of alcohol - which can reach over 15% ABV in Zinfandels from California. Some producers feel that this unbalances their wine, and use spinning cones to reduce the alcohol by 1-2 percentage points. In this case the wine is passed through the column once to distill out the most volatile aroma compounds which are then put to one side while the wine goes through the column a second time at higher temperature to extract alcohol. The aroma compounds are then mixed back into the wine. Some producers such as Joel Peterson of Ravenswood argue that technological "fixes" such as spinning cones remove a sense of terroir from the wine; if the wine has the tannins and other components to balance 15% alcohol, Peterson argues that it should be accepted on its own terms.

The use of spinning cones, and other technologies such as reverse osmosis, was banned in the EU until recently, although for many years they could freely be used in wines imported into the EU from certain New World wine producing countries such as Australia and the USA. In November 2007, the Wine Standards Branch (WSB) of the UK's Food Standards Agency banned the sale of a wine called Sovio, made from Spanish grapes that would normally produce wines of 14% ABV. Sovio runs 40-50% of the wine over spinning cones to reduce the alcohol content to 8%, which means that under EU law it could not be sold as wine as it was below 8.5%; above that, under the rules prevailing at the time, it would be banned because spinning cones could not be used in EU winemaking.

Subsequently, the EU legalized dealcoholization with a 2% adjustment limit in its Code of Winemaking Practices, publishing that in its Commission Regulation (EC) No 606/2009 and stipulating that the dealcoholization must be accomplished by physical separation techniques which would embrace the spinning cone method.

More recently, in International Organisation of Vine and Wine Resolutions OIV-OENO 394A-2012 and OIV-OENO 394B-2012 of June 22, 2012 EU recommended winemaking procedures were modified to permit use of the spinning cone column and membrane techniques such as reverse osmosis on wine, subject to a 20% limitation on the adjustment. That limitation is currently under review following the proposal by some EU members that it be eliminated altogether. The limitation is applicable only to products formally labeled as "wine".

== See also ==
- Winemaking
- Distillation
- Spinning band distillation
