= Viktor Dilman =

Russian scientist

Viktor Vasilyevich Dilman
- Born: March 11, 1926; Proskurov (now Khmel’nitskiy), Ukrainian SSR, Soviet Union
- Education: Moscow Institute of Chemical Engineering; All-Union Research Institute of Oxygen Engineering; Institute of Nitrogen Industry and Organic Synthesis Products
- Known for: chemical engineering, hydrodynamics

Viktor Vasilyevich Dilman, also spelled Dil'man (Russian: Виктор Васильевич Дильман, born March 11, 1926, in Proskurov (now Khmel’nitskiy), Ukrainian SSR, Soviet Union) is a Russian scientist performing research for USPolyResearch. He is best known for his work in chemical engineering and hydrodynamics including the approximate methods for solving nonlinear differential equations of mass, heat, and momentum transfer; mathematical modeling of chemical reactor processes and catalytic distillation; heat, mass, and momentum transfer in turbulent flow; fluid dynamics in granular beds; surface convection (Marangoni instability), absorption, and molecular convection.

== Biography ==
Dilman received MS in cryogenic engineering from the Moscow Institute of Chemical Engineering (1947), PhD in chemical engineering from the All-Union Research Institute of Oxygen Engineering (Moscow, 1953), and DSc in chemical engineering from the Institute of Nitrogen Industry and Organic Synthesis Products (Moscow, 1968). His major job track record includes head of ammonia synthesis laboratory at the Institute of Nitrogen Industry and Organic Synthesis Products (1965 to 1988); lead researcher at the Kurnakov Institute of General and Inorganic Chemistry, Russian Academy of Sciences (1988 to present); professor at the Moscow Physicotechnical Institute (1981 to present); senior researcher (2005 to present) at USPolyResearch.

== Major scientific achievements ==
Dilman developed several approximate methods for solving complicated mass, heat, and momentum transfer problems; proposed a wave model for describing the longitudinal dispersion in turbulent flow; identified the conditions at which the Marangoni effect can occur; showed that the diffusion evaporation mode in unsteady evaporation of liquid into gas may lose its stability if the molecular weight of the evaporating liquid is smaller than that of the gas in contact with this liquid. The total number of published papers and books is more than 300. Currently serves on the Editorial Advisory Board of Theor. Found. Chem. Eng.
