= Distillation =

Method of separating mixtures

Laboratory model of a still. 1: The heat source to boil the mixture 2: round-bottom flask containing the mixture to be boiled 3: the head of the still 4: mixture boiling-point thermometer 5: the condenser of the still 6: the cooling-water inlet of the condenser 7: the cooling-water outlet of the condenser 8: the distillate-receiving flask 9: vacuum pump and gas inlet 10: the receiver of the still 11: the heat control for heating the mixture 12: stirring mechanism speed control 13: stirring mechanism and heating plate 14: heating bath (oil/sand) for the flask 15: the stirring mechanism (not shown, e.g. boiling chips or mechanical stirring machine) 16: the distillate-cooling water bath.

Distillation, also classical distillation, is the process of separating the component substances of a liquid mixture of two or more chemically discrete substances by selective boiling of the mixture and the condensation of the vapors in a still.

Distillation can operate over a wide range of pressures from 0.14 bar (e.g., ethylbenzene/styrene) to nearly 21 bar (e.g., propylene/propane) and is capable of separating feeds with high volumetric flowrates and various components that cover a range of relative volatilities from only 1.17 (o-xylene/m-xylene) to 81.2 (water/ethylene glycol). Distillation provides a convenient and time-tested solution to separate a diversity of chemicals in a continuous manner with high purity. However, distillation has an enormous environmental footprint, resulting in the consumption of approximately 25% of all industrial energy use. The key issue is that distillation operates based on phase changes, and this separation mechanism requires vast energy inputs.

Dry distillation (thermolysis and pyrolysis) is the heating of solid materials to produce gases that condense either into fluid products or into solid products. The term dry distillation includes the separation processes of destructive distillation and of chemical cracking, breaking down large hydrocarbon molecules into smaller hydrocarbon molecules. Moreover, a partial distillation results in partial separations of the mixture's components, which process yields nearly pure components; partial distillation also realizes partial separations of the mixture to increase the concentrations of selected components. In either method, the separation process of distillation exploits the differences in the relative volatility of the component substances of the heated mixture.

In the industrial applications of classical distillation, the term distillation is used as a unit of operation that identifies and denotes a process of physical separation, not a chemical reaction; thus an industrial installation that produces distilled beverages, is a distillery of alcohol. These are some applications of the distillation process:

- Distilling fermented products to yield alcoholic beverages with a high content by volume of ethyl alcohol.
- Desalination to produce potable water and for medico-industrial applications.
- Crude oil stabilisation, a partial distillation to reduce the vapor pressure of crude oil, which thus is safe to store and to transport, and thereby reduces the volume of atmospheric emissions of volatile hydrocarbons.
- Fractional distillation is used in the midstream operations of an oil refinery for producing fuels and chemical raw materials for livestock feed.
- Cryogenic air separation into the component gases — oxygen, nitrogen, and argon — for use as industrial gases.
- Chemical synthesis to separate impurities and unreacted materials.

== History ==
=== Iron Age ===
Early evidence of distillation was found on Akkadian tablets dated c. 1200 BCE describing perfumery operations. The tablets provided textual evidence that an early, primitive form of distillation was known to the Babylonians of ancient Mesopotamia.

=== Classical antiquity ===
==== "Distillare" ====
According to British chemist T. Fairley, neither the Greeks nor the Romans had any term for the modern concept of distillation. Words like "distill" would have referred to something else, in most cases, a part of some process unrelated to what is now known as distillation. According to Fairley:

The Latin "distillo," from de-stillo, from stilla, a drop, referred to the dropping of a liquid by human or artificial means, and was applied to any process where a liquid was separated in drops. To distil in the modern sense could only be expressed in a roundabout manner.

In the words of German chemical engineer Norbert Kockmann:

Distillation had a broader meaning in ancient and medieval times because nearly all purification and separation operations were subsumed under the term distillation, such as filtration, crystallization, extraction, sublimation, or mechanical pressing of oil.

According to Dutch chemical historian Robert J. Forbes, the word "distillare" (to drip off) when used by the Romans, e.g. Seneca and Pliny the Elder, was "never used in our sense".

==== Aristotle ====
Aristotle knew that water condensing from evaporating seawater is fresh:

Salt water when it turns into vapour becomes sweet, and the vapour does not form salt water when it condenses again. This I know by experiment.

Letting seawater evaporate and condense into freshwater cannot be called "distillation" for distillation involves boiling, but the experiment may have been an important step towards distillation.

==== Alexandrian chemists ====
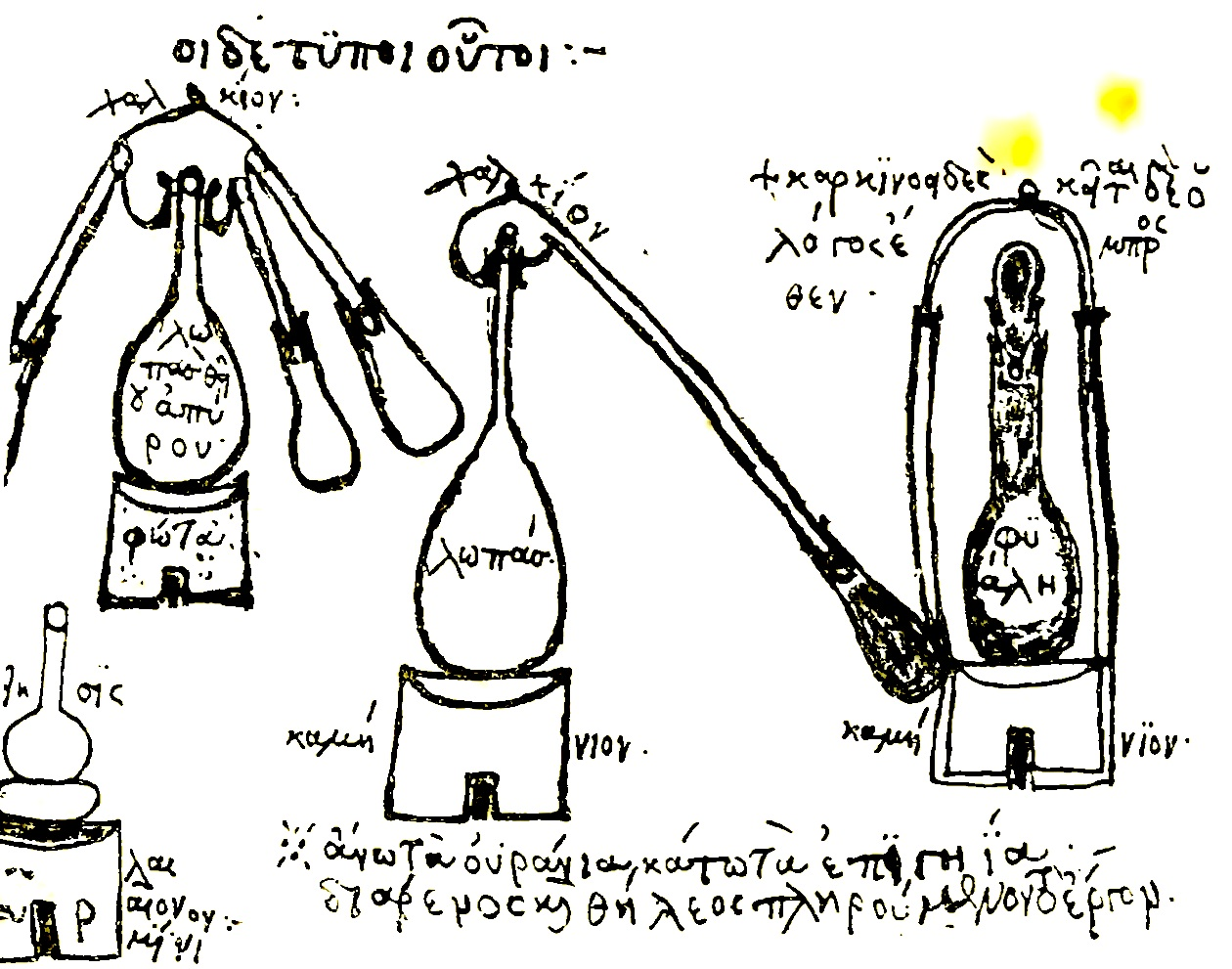
Distillation equipment used by the 3rd-century alchemist Zosimos of Panopolis (as imagined by the anonymous illustrator of the 15th-century Byzantine Greek manuscript Codex Parisinus graecus 2327).

Early evidence of distillation has been found related to alchemists working in Alexandria in Roman Egypt in the 1st century CE.

Distilled water has been in use since at least c. 200 CE, when Alexander of Aphrodisias described the process. Work on distilling other liquids continued in early Byzantine Egypt under Zosimus of Panopolis in the 3rd century.

=== Classical India and Ancient China ===
Distillation was practiced in the ancient Indian subcontinent, which is evident from baked clay retorts and receivers found at Taxila, Shaikhan Dheri, and Charsadda in Pakistan and Rang Mahal in India dating to the early centuries of the Common Era. Frank Raymond Allchin says these terracotta distillation tubes were "made to imitate bamboo". These "Gandhara stills" were only capable of producing a very weak distillate, as there was no efficient means of collecting the vapors at low heat. Distillation in China may have begun at the earliest during the Eastern Han dynasty (1st–2nd century CE).

=== Islamic Golden Age ===
Medieval Muslim chemists such as Abū Bakr al-Rāzī (Latin: Rhazes, c. 865–925) and the anonymous chemists writing under the name of Jābir ibn Ḥayyān (Latin: Geber, ninth century) experimented extensively with the distillation of various substances. The fractional distillation of organic substances plays an important role in the works attributed to Jābir, such as in the Kitāb al-Sabʿīn ('The Book of Seventy'), translated into Latin by Gerard of Cremona (c. 1114–1187) under the title Liber de septuaginta. The Jabirian experiments with fractional distillation of animal and vegetable substances, and to a lesser degree also of mineral substances, is the main topic of the De anima in arte alkimiae, an originally Arabic work falsely attributed to Avicenna that was translated into Latin and would go on to form the most important alchemical source for Roger Bacon (c. 1220–1292).

The distillation of wine is attested in Arabic works attributed to al-Kindī (c. 801–873 CE) and to al-Fārābī (c. 872–950), and in the 28th book of al-Zahrāwī's (Latin: Abulcasis, 936–1013) Kitāb al-Taṣrīf (later translated into Latin as Liber servatoris). In the twelfth century, recipes for the production of aqua ardens ("burning water", i.e., ethanol) by distilling wine with salt started to appear in a number of Latin works, and by the end of the thirteenth century it had become a widely known substance among Western European chemists. The works of Taddeo Alderotti (1223–1296) describe a method for concentrating alcohol involving repeated distillation through a water-cooled still, by which an alcohol purity of 90% could be obtained.

=== Medieval China ===
The distillation of beverages began in the Southern Song (10th–13th century) and Jin (12th–13th century) dynasties, according to archaeological evidence. A still was found in an archaeological site in Qinglong, Hebei province, China, dating back to the 12th century. Distilled beverages were common during the Yuan dynasty (13th–14th century).

=== Modern era ===
In 1500, German alchemist Hieronymus Brunschwig published Liber de arte distillandi de simplicibus (The Book of the Art of Distillation out of Simple Ingredients), the first book solely dedicated to the subject of distillation, followed in 1512 by a much expanded version. Right after that, in 1518, the oldest surviving distillery in Europe, the Green Tree Distillery, was founded.

In 1651, John French published The Art of Distillation, the first major English compendium on the practice, but it has been claimed that much of it derives from Brunschwig's work. This includes diagrams with people in them showing the industrial rather than bench scale of the operation.

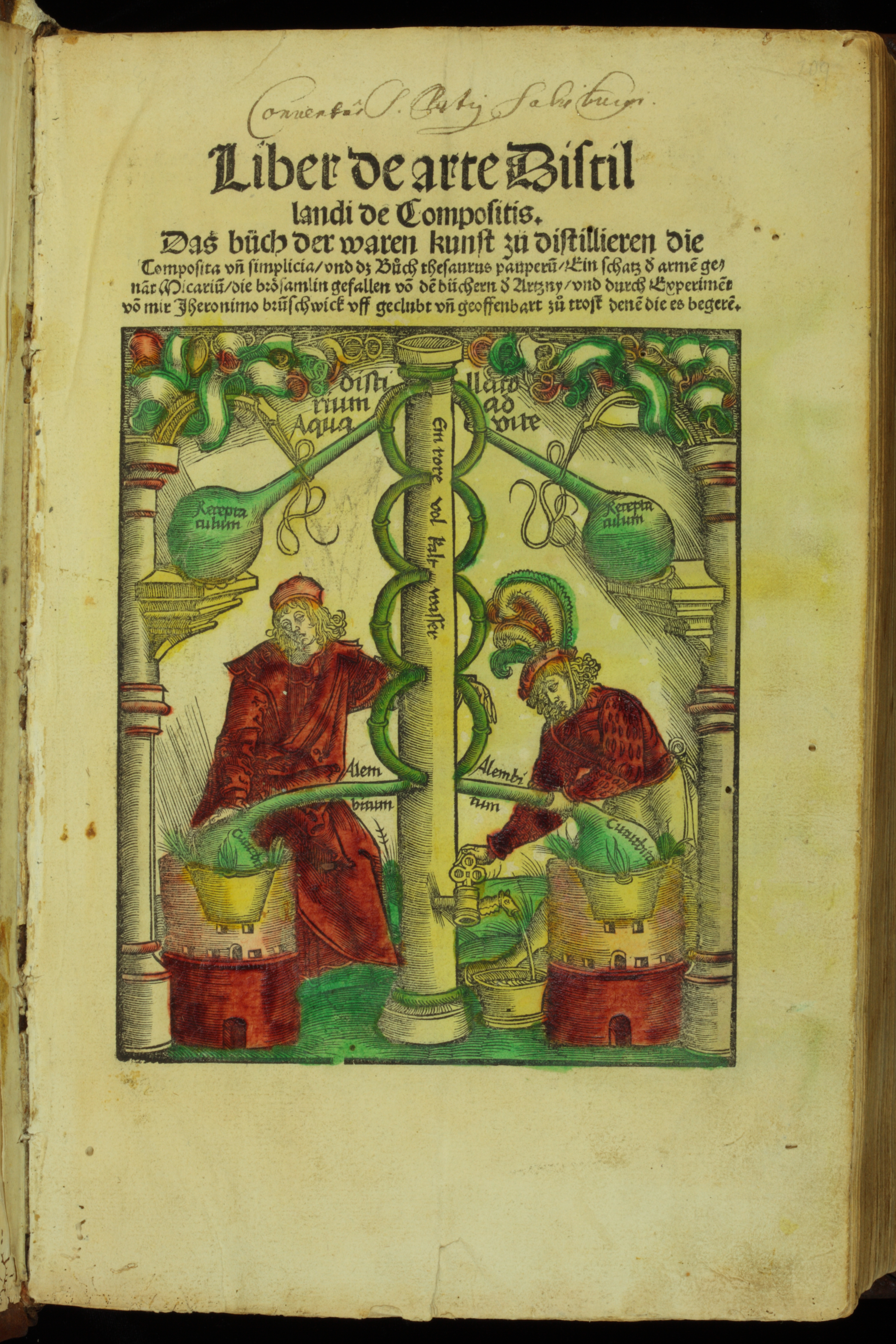
Hieronymus Brunschwig's Liber de arte Distillandi de Compositis (Strassburg, 1512) Science History Institute

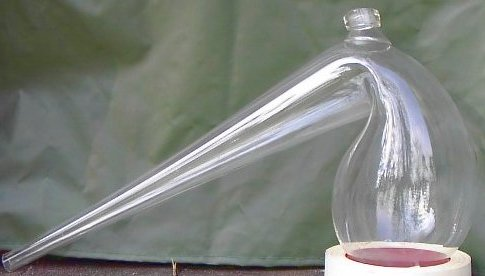
A retort

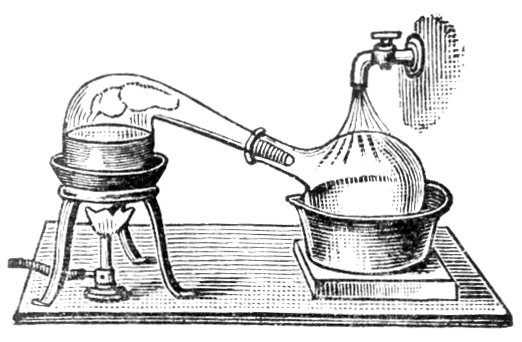
Distillation

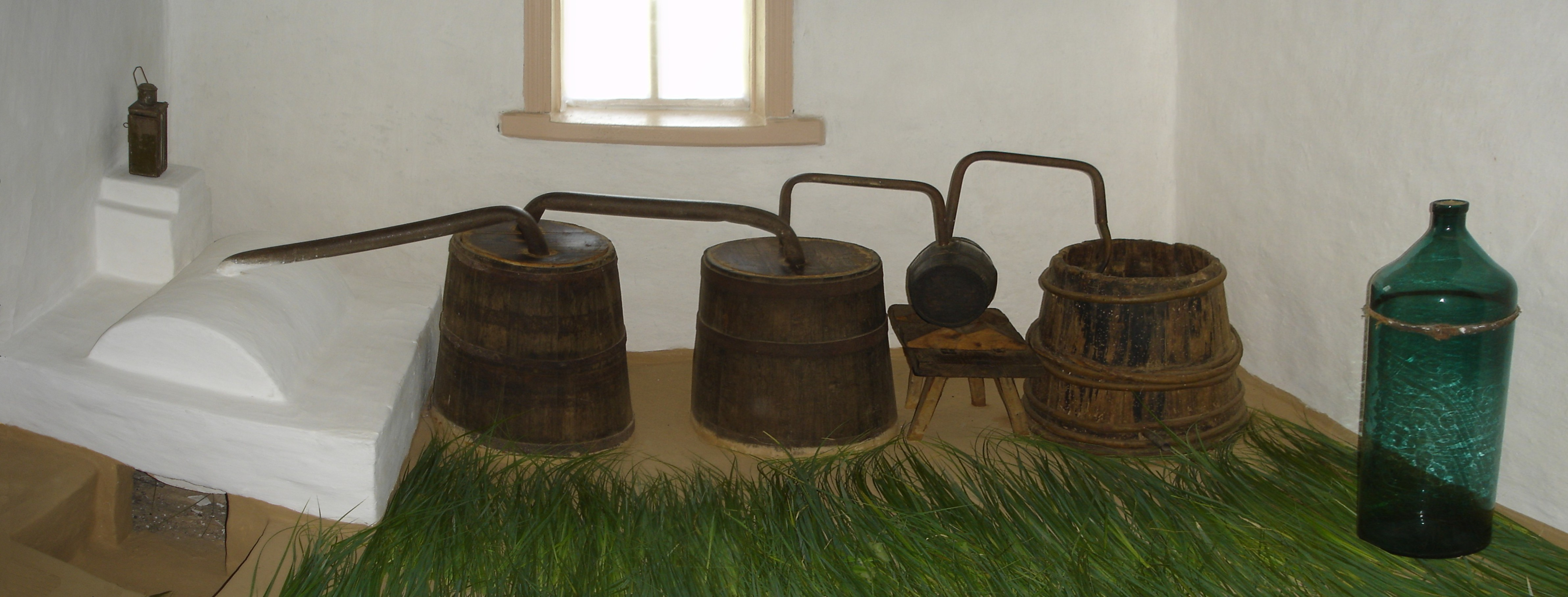
Old Ukrainian vodka still

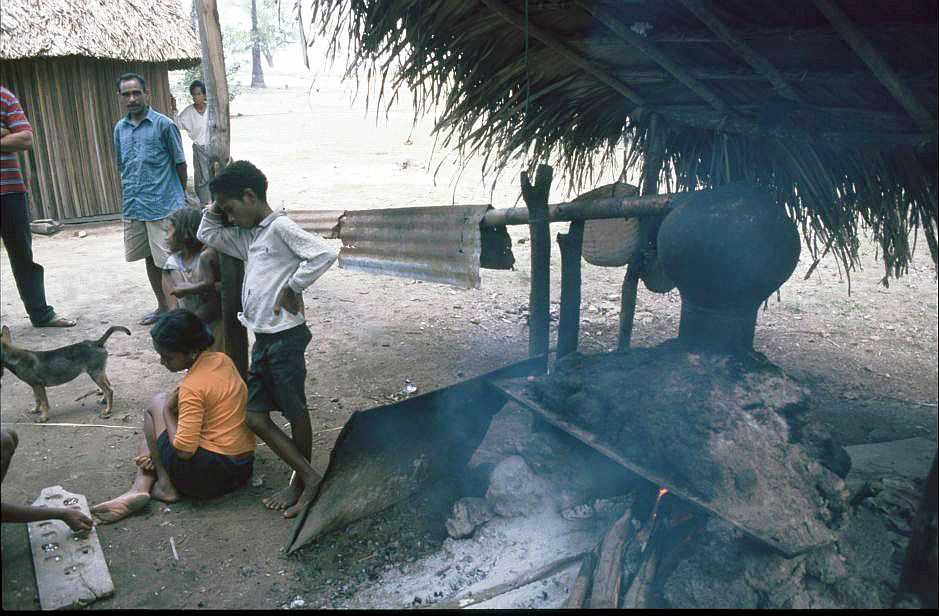
Simple liqueur distillation in East Timor

As alchemy evolved into the science of chemistry, retorts became used for distillations. Both alembics and retorts are glass vessels with long necks pointing to the side at a downward angle to act as air-cooled condensers to condense the distillate and let it drip downward for collection. Later, copper alembics were used. Riveted joints were often kept tight by using various mixtures, for instance, a dough made of rye flour. These alembics often used a cooling system around the beak, using cold water for instance, which made the condensation of alcohol more efficient. These were called pot stills. Today, the retorts and pot stills have been largely supplanted by more efficient distillation methods in most industrial processes. However, the pot still is still widely used for the production of some fine alcoholic beverages including cognac, whisky and whiskey, tequila, rum, cachaça, and some vodkas. Pot stills made of various materials (wood, clay, stainless steel) are also used by bootleggers in various countries. Small pot stills are also sold for use in the domestic production of flower water or essential oils.

Early forms of distillation involved batch processes using one vaporization and one condensation. Purity was improved by further distillation of the condensate. Greater volumes were processed by simply repeating the distillation. Chemists reportedly carried out as many as 500 to 600 distillations in order to obtain a pure compound.

In the early 19th century, the basics of modern techniques, including pre-heating and reflux, were developed. In 1822 Anthony Perrier developed one of the first continuous stills, and in 1826 Robert Stein improved that design to make his patent still. In 1830, Aeneas Coffey was granted a patent for improving the design further. Coffey's continuous still may be regarded as the archetype of modern petrochemical units. The French engineer Armand Savalle developed his steam regulator around 1846. In 1877, Ernest Solvay was granted a U.S. patent for a tray column for ammonia distillation; from that year there were further developments on distilling oils and spirits.

With the emergence of chemical engineering as a discipline at the end of the 19th century, scientific rather than empirical methods could be applied. The developing petroleum industry in the early 20th century provided the impetus for the development of accurate design methods, such as the McCabe–Thiele method by Ernest Thiele, and the Fenske equation. The first industrial plant in the United States to use distillation as a means of desalinating seawater opened in Freeport, Texas in 1961 with the hope of bringing water security to the region. The availability of powerful computers enabled distillation columns to be simulated numerically.

== Applications ==
The application of distillation can roughly be divided into four groups: laboratory scale, industrial distillation, distillation of herbs for perfumery and medicinals (herbal distillate), and food processing. The latter two are distinctively different from the former two in that distillation is not used as a true purification method but more to transfer all volatiles from the source materials to the distillate in the processing of beverages and herbs.

The main difference between laboratory scale distillation and industrial distillation are that laboratory scale distillation is often performed on a batch basis, whereas industrial distillation often occurs continuously. In batch distillation, the composition of the source material, the vapors of the distilling compounds, and the distillate change during the distillation. In batch distillation, a still is charged (supplied) with a batch of feed mixture, which is then separated into its component fractions, which are collected sequentially from most volatile to less volatile, with the bottoms – remaining least or non-volatile fraction – removed at the end. The still can then be recharged and the process repeated.

In continuous distillation, the source materials, vapors, and distillate are kept at a constant composition by carefully replenishing the source material and removing fractions from both vapor and liquid in the system. This results in a more detailed control of the separation process.

== Idealized model ==
The boiling point of a liquid is the temperature at which the vapor pressure of the liquid equals the pressure around the liquid, enabling bubbles to form without being crushed. A special case is the normal boiling point, where the vapor pressure of the liquid equals the ambient atmospheric pressure.

It is a misconception that in a liquid mixture at a given pressure, each component boils at the boiling point corresponding to the given pressure, allowing the vapors of each component to collect separately and purely: this does not occur, even in an ideal system. Idealized models of distillation are essentially governed by Raoult and Dalton's laws, and assume that vapor–liquid equilibria are attained.

Raoult's law states that the vapor pressure of a solution is dependent on 1) the vapor pressure of each chemical component in the solution and 2) the fraction of solution each component makes up, the mole fraction. This law applies to ideal solutions, or solutions that have different components but whose molecular interactions are the same as or very similar to pure solutions.

Dalton's law states that the total pressure is the sum of the partial pressures of each individual component in the mixture. When a multi-component liquid is heated, the vapor pressure of each component will rise, thus causing the total vapor pressure to rise. When the total vapor pressure reaches the pressure surrounding the liquid, it boils, and the liquid turns to gas throughout the bulk of the liquid. A mixture with a given composition has one boiling point at a given pressure when the components are mutually soluble. A mixture of constant composition does not have multiple boiling points.

An implication of one boiling point is that lighter components never cleanly "boil first". At the boiling point, all volatile components boil, but for a component, its percentage in the vapor is the same as its percentage of the total vapor pressure. Lighter components have a higher partial pressure and, thus, are concentrated in the vapor, but heavier volatile components also have a (smaller) partial pressure and necessarily vaporize also, albeit at a lower concentration in the vapor. Indeed, batch distillation and fractionation succeed by varying the composition of the mixture. In batch distillation, the batch vaporizes, which changes its composition; in fractionation, the liquid higher in the fractionation column contains more light components and boils at lower temperatures. Therefore, starting from a given mixture, it appears to have a boiling range instead of a boiling point, although this is because its composition changes: each intermediate mixture has its own, singular boiling point.

The idealized model is accurate in the case of chemically similar liquids, such as benzene and toluene. In other cases, severe deviations from Raoult's law and Dalton's law are observed, most famously in the mixture of ethanol and water. These compounds, when heated together, form an azeotrope, with the vapor and liquid phases having the same composition. Although there are computational methods to estimate the behavior of a mixture of arbitrary components, the only way to obtain accurate vapor–liquid equilibrium data is by measurement.

It is not possible to completely purify a mixture of components by distillation, as this would require each component in the mixture to have a zero partial pressure. If ultra-pure products are the goal, then further chemical separation is required. When a binary mixture is vaporized and the other component, e.g., a salt, has negligible partial pressure, zero for practical purposes, the process is simpler.

=== Batch or differential distillation ===
A batch still showing the separation of A and B.

Heating an ideal mixture of two volatile substances, A and B, with A having the higher volatility, or lower boiling point, in a batch distillation setup (such as in an apparatus depicted in the opening figure) until the mixture is boiling results in a vapor above the liquid that contains a mixture of A and B. The ratio between A and B in the vapor will be different from the ratio in the liquid. The ratio in the liquid will be determined by how the original mixture was prepared, while the ratio in the vapor will be enriched in the more volatile compound, A (due to Raoult's Law, see above). The vapor goes through the condenser and is removed from the system. This, in turn, means that the ratio of compounds in the remaining liquid is now different from the initial ratio (i.e., more enriched in B than in the starting liquid).

The result is that the ratio in the liquid mixture is changing, becoming richer in component B. This causes the boiling point of the mixture to rise, which results in a rise in the temperature in the vapor, which results in a changing ratio of A : B in the gas phase (as distillation continues, there is an increasing proportion of B in the gas phase). This results in a slowly changing ratio of A : B in the distillate.

If the difference in vapour pressure between the two components A and B is large – generally expressed as the difference in boiling points – the mixture at the beginning of the distillation is highly enriched in component A, and when component A has distilled off, the boiling liquid is enriched in component B.

=== Continuous distillation ===
Continuous distillation is an ongoing distillation in which a liquid mixture is continuously (without interruption) fed into the process, and separated fractions are removed continuously as output streams occur over time during the operation. Continuous distillation produces a minimum of two output fractions, including at least one volatile distillate fraction, which has boiled and been separately captured as a vapor and then condensed to a liquid. There is always a bottoms (or residue) fraction, which is the least volatile residue that has not been separately captured as a condensed vapor.

Continuous distillation differs from batch distillation in the respect that concentrations should not change over time. Continuous distillation can be run at a steady state for an arbitrary amount of time. For any source material of specific composition, the main variables that affect the purity of products in continuous distillation are the reflux ratio and the number of theoretical equilibrium stages, in practice determined by the number of trays or the height of packing. Reflux is a flow from the condenser back to the column, which generates a recycle that allows a better separation with a given number of trays. Equilibrium stages are ideal steps where compositions achieve vapor–liquid equilibrium, repeating the separation process and allowing better separation given a reflux ratio. A column with a high reflux ratio may have fewer stages, but it refluxes a large amount of liquid, giving a wide column with a large holdup. Conversely, a column with a low reflux ratio must have a large number of stages, thus requiring a taller column.

=== General improvements ===
Both batch and continuous distillations can be improved by making use of a fractionating column on top of the distillation flask. The column improves separation by providing a larger surface area for the vapor and condensate to come into contact. This helps it remain at equilibrium for as long as possible. The column can even consist of small subsystems ('trays' or 'dishes') which all contain an enriched, boiling liquid mixture, each with its own vapor–liquid equilibrium.

There are differences between laboratory- and industrial-scale fractionating columns, but the principles are the same. Examples of laboratory-scale fractionating columns (in order of increasing efficiency) include:

- Air condenser
- Vigreux column (usually laboratory scale only)
- Packed column (packed with glass beads, metal pieces, or other chemically inert material)
- Spinning band distillation system.

== Laboratory procedures ==
Laboratory-scale distillations are almost exclusively run as batch distillations. The device used in distillation, sometimes referred to as a still, consists at a minimum of a reboiler or pot in which the source material is heated, a condenser in which the heated vapor is cooled back to the liquid state, and a receiver in which the concentrated or purified liquid, called the distillate, is collected. Several laboratory-scale techniques for distillation exist.

A completely sealed distillation apparatus could experience extreme and rapidly varying internal pressure, which could cause it to burst open at the joints. Therefore, some path is usually left open (for instance, at the receiving flask) to allow the internal pressure to equalize with atmospheric pressure. Alternatively, a vacuum pump may be used to keep the apparatus at a lower than atmospheric pressure. If the substances involved are air- or moisture-sensitive, the connection to the atmosphere can be made through one or more drying tubes packed with materials that scavenge the undesired air components, or through bubblers that provide a movable liquid barrier. Finally, the entry of undesired air components can be prevented by pumping a low but steady flow of suitable inert gas, like nitrogen, into the apparatus.

=== Simple distillation ===
Schematic of a simple distillation setup

In simple distillation, the vapor is immediately channeled into a condenser. Consequently, the distillate is not pure, but rather its composition is identical to the composition of the vapors at the given temperature and pressure. That concentration follows Raoult's law.

As a result, simple distillation is effective only when the liquid boiling points differ greatly (rule of thumb is 25 °C) or when separating liquids from non-volatile solids or oils. For these cases, the vapor pressures of the components are usually different enough that the distillate may be sufficiently pure for its intended purpose.

A cutaway schematic of a simple distillation operation is shown at right. The starting liquid 15 in the boiling flask 2 is heated by a combined hotplate and magnetic stirrer 13 via a silicone oil bath (orange, 14). The vapor flows through a short Vigreux column 3, then through a Liebig condenser 5, is cooled by water (blue) that circulates through ports 6 and 7. The condensed liquid drips into the receiving flask 8, sitting in a cooling bath (blue, 16). The adapter 10 has a connection 9 that may be fitted to a vacuum pump. The components are connected by ground glass joints.

=== Fractional distillation ===
For many cases, the boiling points of the components in the mixture will be sufficiently close that Raoult's law must be taken into consideration. Therefore, fractional distillation must be used to separate the components by repeated vaporization-condensation cycles within a packed fractionating column. This separation, by successive distillations, is also referred to as rectification.

As the solution to be purified is heated, its vapors rise to the fractionating column. As it rises, it cools, condensing on the condenser walls and the surfaces of the packing material. Here, the condensate continues to be heated by the rising hot vapors; it vaporizes once more. However, the composition of the fresh vapors is determined once again by Raoult's law. Each vaporization-condensation cycle (called a theoretical plate) will yield a purer solution of the more volatile component. In reality, each cycle at a given temperature does not occur at exactly the same position in the fractionating column; theoretical plate is thus a concept rather than an accurate description.

More theoretical plates lead to better separations. A spinning band distillation system uses a spinning band of PTFE or metal to force the rising vapors into close contact with the descending condensate, increasing the number of theoretical plates.

=== Steam distillation ===
Like vacuum distillation, steam distillation is a method for distilling compounds which are heat-sensitive. The temperature of the steam is easier to control than the surface of a heating element and allows a high rate of heat transfer without heating at a very high temperature. This process involves bubbling steam through a heated mixture of the raw material. By Raoult's law, some of the target compound will vaporize (in accordance with its partial pressure). The vapor mixture is cooled and condensed, usually yielding a layer of oil and a layer of water.

Steam distillation of various aromatic herbs and flowers can result in two products: an essential oil as well as a watery herbal distillate. The essential oils are often used in perfumery and aromatherapy while the watery distillates have many applications in aromatherapy, food processing and skin care.

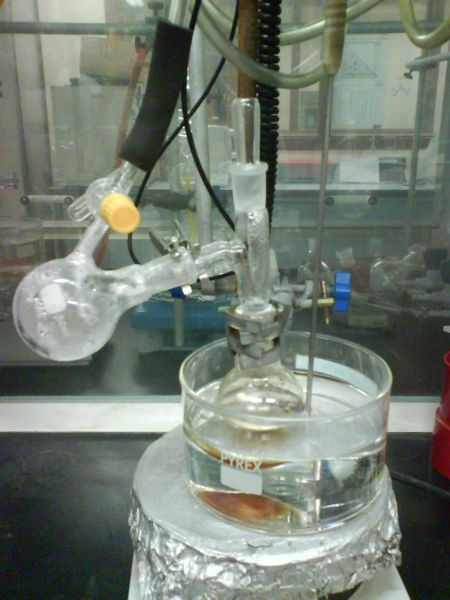
Dimethyl sulfoxide usually boils at 189 °C. Under a vacuum, it distills off into the receiver at only 70 °C.

Perkin triangle distillation setup: 1. Stirrer bar/anti-bumping granules; 2. Still pot; 3. Fractionating column; 4. Thermometer/Boiling point temperature; 5. Teflon tap 1; 6. Cold finger; 7. Cooling water out; 8. Cooling water in; 9. Teflon tap 2; 10. Vacuum/gas inlet; 11. Teflon tap 3; 12. Still receiver

=== Vacuum distillation ===
Some compounds have very high boiling points. To boil such compounds, it is often better to lower the pressure at which such compounds are boiled instead of increasing the temperature. Once the pressure is lowered to the vapor pressure of the compound (at the given temperature), boiling and the rest of the distillation process can commence. This technique is referred to as vacuum distillation and it is commonly found in the laboratory in the form of the rotary evaporator.

This technique is also very useful for compounds which boil beyond their decomposition temperature at atmospheric pressure and which would therefore be decomposed by any attempt to boil them under atmospheric pressure.

=== Molecular distillation ===
Molecular distillation is vacuum distillation below the pressure of 0.01 torr. 0.01 torr is one order of magnitude above high vacuum, where fluids are in the free molecular flow regime, i.e., the mean free path of molecules is comparable to the size of the equipment. The gaseous phase no longer exerts significant pressure on the substance to be evaporated, and consequently, rate of evaporation no longer depends on pressure. That is, because the continuum assumptions of fluid dynamics no longer apply, mass transport is governed by molecular dynamics rather than fluid dynamics. Thus, a short path between the hot surface and the cold surface is necessary, typically by suspending a hot plate covered with a film of feed next to a cold plate with a line of sight in between. Molecular distillation is used industrially for purification of oils.

=== Short-path distillation ===
Short path vacuum distillation apparatus with vertical condenser (cold finger), to minimize the distillation path; 1. Still pot with stirrer bar/anti-bumping granules; 2. Cold finger – bent to direct condensate; 3. Cooling water out; 4. cooling water in; 5. Vacuum/gas inlet; 6. Distillate flask/distillate.

Short-path distillation is a distillation technique that involves the distillate travelling a short distance, often only a few centimeters, and is normally done at reduced pressure. A classic example would be a distillation involving the distillate travelling from one glass bulb to another, without the need for a condenser separating the two chambers. This technique is often used for compounds which are unstable at high temperatures or to purify small amounts of compound. The advantage is that the heating temperature can be considerably lower (at reduced pressure) than the boiling point of the liquid at standard pressure, and the distillate only has to travel a short distance before condensing. A short path ensures that little compound is lost on the sides of the apparatus.

While classic short-path distillation systems in the laboratory work with a static, heated flask in which the material evaporates as a pool of liquid, there are also systems that combine the advantages of thin-film distillation with those of short-path distillation. In this case, it is a thin-film evaporator with an internal rather than an external condenser.

=== Air-sensitive vacuum distillation ===
Some compounds have high boiling points as well as being air sensitive. A simple vacuum distillation system as exemplified above can be used, whereby the vacuum is replaced with an inert gas after the distillation is complete. However, this is a less satisfactory system if one desires to collect fractions under a reduced pressure. To do this a "cow" or "pig" adaptor can be added to the end of the condenser, or for better results or for very air sensitive compounds a Perkin triangle apparatus can be used.

The Perkin triangle has means via a series of glass or Teflon taps to allows fractions to be isolated from the rest of the still, without the main body of the distillation being removed from either the vacuum or heat source, and thus can remain in a state of reflux. To do this, the sample is first isolated from the vacuum by means of the taps, the vacuum over the sample is then replaced with an inert gas (such as nitrogen or argon) and can then be stoppered and removed. A fresh collection vessel can then be added to the system, evacuated and linked back into the distillation system via the taps to collect a second fraction, and so on, until all fractions have been collected.

Zone distillation is the distillation analog of zone recrystallization. Impurity distribution in the condensate is described by known equations of zone recrystallization, with the separation factor α of distillation used in place of the crystallization distribution coefficient k.

=== Closed-system vacuum distillation (cryovap) ===
Non-condensable gas can be expelled from the apparatus by the vapor of relatively volatile co-solvent, which spontaneously evaporates during initial pumping, and this can be achieved with regular oil or diaphragm pump.

=== Other types ===
- The process of reactive distillation involves using the reaction vessel as the still. In this process, the product is usually significantly lower boiling than its reactants. As the product is formed from the reactants, it is vaporized and removed from the reaction mixture. This technique is an example of a continuous vs. a batch process; advantages include less downtime to charge the reaction vessel with starting material, and less workup. Distillation "over a reactant" could be classified as a reactive distillation. It is typically used to remove volatile impurity from the distillation feed. For example, a little lime may be added to remove carbon dioxide from water followed by a second distillation with a little sulfuric acid added to remove traces of ammonia.
- Catalytic distillation is the process by which the reactants are catalyzed while being distilled to continuously separate the products from the reactants. This method is used to assist equilibrium reactions in reaching completion.
- Pervaporation is a method for the separation of mixtures of liquids by partial vaporization through a non-porous membrane.
- Extractive distillation is defined as distillation in the presence of a miscible, high boiling, relatively non-volatile component, the solvent, that forms no azeotrope with the other components in the mixture.
- Flash evaporation (or partial evaporation) is the partial vaporization that occurs when a saturated liquid stream undergoes a reduction in pressure by passing through a throttling valve or other throttling device. This process is one of the simplest unit operations, being equivalent to a distillation with only one equilibrium stage.
- Codistillation is distillation which is performed on mixtures in which the two compounds are not miscible. In the laboratory, the Dean-Stark apparatus is used for this purpose to remove water from synthesis products. The Bleidner apparatus is another example with two refluxing solvents.
- Membrane distillation is a type of distillation in which vapors of a mixture to be separated are passed through a membrane, which selectively permeates one component of mixture. Vapor pressure difference is the driving force. It has potential applications in seawater desalination and in removal of organic and inorganic components.

The unit process of evaporation may also be called "distillation":

- In rotary evaporation a vacuum distillation apparatus is used to remove bulk solvents from a sample. Typically the vacuum is generated by a water aspirator or a membrane pump.
- In a Kugelrohr apparatus a short-path distillation apparatus is typically used (generally in combination with a (high) vacuum) to distill high boiling (> 300 °C) compounds. The apparatus consists of an oven in which the compound to be distilled is placed, a receiving portion which is outside of the oven, and a means of rotating the sample. The vacuum is normally generated by using a high vacuum pump.

Other uses:

- Dry distillation or destructive distillation, despite the name, is not truly distillation, but rather a chemical reaction known as pyrolysis in which solid substances are heated in an inert or reducing atmosphere and any volatile fractions, containing high-boiling liquids and products of pyrolysis, are collected. The destructive distillation of wood to give methanol is the root of its common name – wood alcohol.
- Freeze distillation is an analogous method of purification using freezing instead of evaporation. It is not truly distillation, but a recrystallization where the product is the mother liquor, and does not produce products equivalent to distillation. This process is used in the production of ice beer and ice wine to increase ethanol and sugar content, respectively. It is also used to produce applejack. Unlike distillation, freeze distillation concentrates poisonous congeners rather than removing them; As a result, many countries prohibit such applejack as a health measure. Also, distillation by evaporation can separate these since they have different boiling points.
- Distillation by filtration: In early alchemy and chemistry, otherwise known as natural philosophy, a form of "distillation" by capillary filtration was known as a form of distillation at the time. In this, a series of cups or bowls were set upon a stepped support with a "wick" of cotton or felt-like material, which had been wetted with water or a clear liquid with each step dripping down through the wetted cloth through capillary action in succeeding steps, creating a "purification" of the liquid, leaving solid materials behind in the upper bowls and purifying the succeeding product through capillary action through the moistened cloth. This was called "distillatio" by filtration by those using the method.

== Azeotropic process ==
Interactions between the components of the solution create properties unique to the solution, as most processes entail non-ideal mixtures, where Raoult's law does not hold. Such interactions can result in a constant-boiling azeotrope which behaves as if it were a pure compound (i.e., boils at a single temperature instead of a range). At an azeotrope, the solution contains the given component in the same proportion as the vapor, so that evaporation does not change the purity, and distillation does not result in separation. For example, 95.6% ethanol (by mass) in water forms an azeotrope at 78.1 °C.

If the azeotrope is not considered sufficiently pure for use, there exist some techniques to break the azeotrope to give a more pure distillate. These techniques are known as azeotropic distillation. Some techniques achieve this by "jumping" over the azeotropic composition (by adding another component to create a new azeotrope, or by varying the pressure). Others work by chemically or physically removing or sequestering the impurity. For example, to purify ethanol beyond 95%, a drying agent (or desiccant, such as potassium carbonate) can be added to convert the soluble water into insoluble water of crystallization. Molecular sieves are often used for this purpose as well.

Immiscible liquids, such as water and toluene, easily form azeotropes. Commonly, these azeotropes are referred to as a low boiling azeotrope because the boiling point of the azeotrope is lower than the boiling point of either pure component. The temperature and composition of the azeotrope is easily predicted from the vapor pressure of the pure components, without use of Raoult's law. The azeotrope is easily broken in a distillation set-up by using a liquid–liquid separator (a decanter) to separate the two liquid layers that are condensed overhead. Only one of the two liquid layers is refluxed to the distillation set-up.

High boiling azeotropes, such as a 20 percent by weight mixture of hydrochloric acid in water, also exist. As implied by the name, the boiling point of the azeotrope is greater than the boiling point of either pure component.

=== Breaking an azeotrope with unidirectional pressure manipulation ===
The boiling points of components in an azeotrope overlap to form a band. By exposing an azeotrope to a vacuum or positive pressure, it is possible to bias the boiling point of one component away from the other by exploiting the differing vapor pressure curves of each; the curves may overlap at the azeotropic point, but are unlikely to remain identical further along the pressure axis to either side of the azeotropic point. When the bias is great enough, the two boiling points no longer overlap and so the azeotropic band disappears.

This method can remove the need to add other chemicals to a distillation, but it has two potential drawbacks.

Under negative pressure, power for a vacuum source is needed and the reduced boiling points of the distillates requires that the condenser be run cooler to prevent distillate vapors being lost to the vacuum source. Increased cooling demands will often require additional energy and possibly new equipment or a change of coolant.

Alternatively, if positive pressures are required, standard glassware can not be used, energy must be used for pressurization and there is a higher chance of side reactions occurring in the distillation, such as decomposition, due to the higher temperatures required to effect boiling.

A unidirectional distillation will rely on a pressure change in one direction, either positive or negative.

=== Pressure-swing distillation ===
Pressure-swing distillation is essentially the same as the unidirectional distillation used to break azeotropic mixtures, but here both positive and negative pressures may be employed.

This improves the selectivity of the distillation and allows a chemist to optimize distillation by avoiding extremes of pressure and temperature that waste energy. This is particularly important in commercial applications.

One example of the application of pressure-swing distillation is during the industrial purification of ethyl acetate after its catalytic synthesis from ethanol.

== Industrial process ==
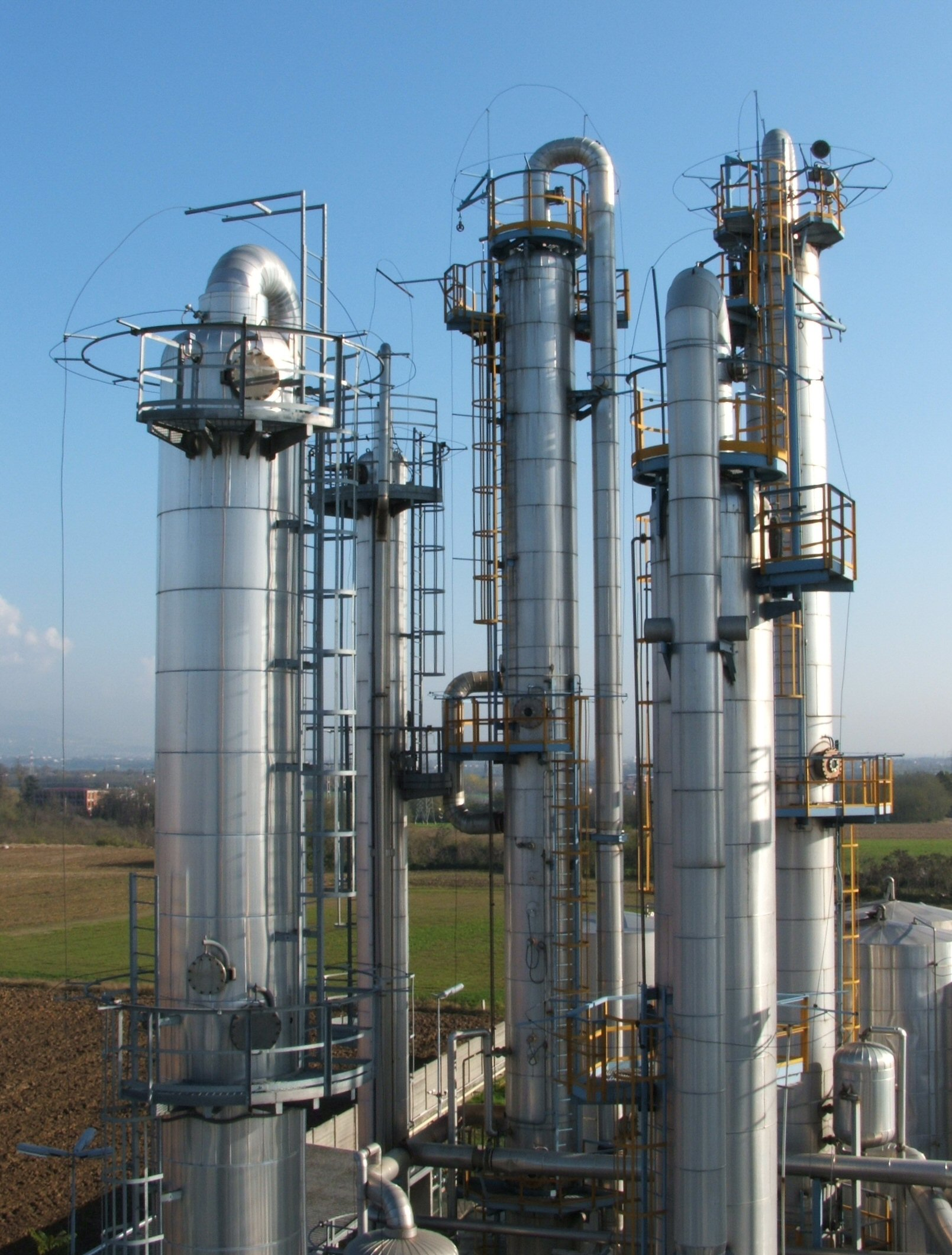
Typical industrial distillation towers

Large scale industrial distillation applications include both batch and continuous fractional, vacuum, azeotropic, extractive, and steam distillation. The most widely used industrial applications of continuous, steady-state fractional distillation are in petroleum refineries, petrochemical and chemical plants and natural gas processing plants.

To control and optimize such industrial distillation, a standardized laboratory method, ASTM D86, is established. This test method extends to the atmospheric distillation of petroleum products using a laboratory batch distillation unit to quantitatively determine the boiling range characteristics of petroleum products.

Industrial distillation is typically performed in large, vertical cylindrical columns known as distillation towers or distillation columns with diameters ranging from about 0.65 to 16 metres (2 ft 2 in to 52 ft 6 in) and heights ranging from about 6 to 90 metres (20 to 295 ft) or more. When the process feed has a diverse composition, as in distilling crude oil, liquid outlets at intervals up the column allow for the withdrawal of different fractions or products having different boiling points or boiling ranges. The "lightest" products (those with the lowest boiling point) exit from the top of the columns and the "heaviest" products (those with the highest boiling point) exit from the bottom of the column and are often called the bottoms.

Diagram of a typical industrial distillation tower

Industrial towers use reflux to achieve a more complete separation of products. Reflux refers to the portion of the condensed overhead liquid product from a distillation or fractionation tower that is returned to the upper part of the tower as shown in the schematic diagram of a typical, large-scale industrial distillation tower. Inside the tower, the downflowing reflux liquid provides cooling and condensation of the upflowing vapors thereby increasing the efficiency of the distillation tower. The more reflux that is provided for a given number of theoretical plates, the better the tower's separation of lower boiling materials from higher boiling materials. Alternatively, the more reflux that is provided for a given desired separation, the fewer the number of theoretical plates required. Chemical engineers must choose what combination of reflux rate and number of plates is both economically and physically feasible for the products purified in the distillation column.

Such industrial fractionating towers are also used in cryogenic air separation, producing liquid oxygen, liquid nitrogen, and high purity argon. Distillation of chlorosilanes also enables the production of high-purity silicon for use as a semiconductor.

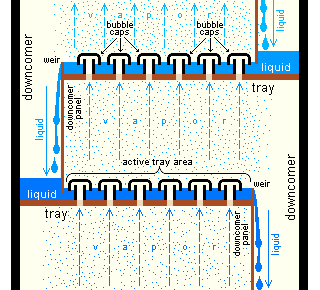
Section of an industrial distillation tower showing detail of trays with bubble caps

Design and operation of a distillation tower depends on the feed and desired products. Given a simple, binary component feed, analytical methods such as the McCabe–Thiele method or the Fenske equation can be used. For a multi-component feed, simulation models are used both for design and operation. Moreover, the efficiencies of the vapor–liquid contact devices (referred to as "plates" or "trays") used in distillation towers are typically lower than that of a theoretical 100% efficient equilibrium stage. Hence, a distillation tower needs more trays than the number of theoretical vapor–liquid equilibrium stages. A variety of models have been postulated to estimate tray efficiencies.

In modern industrial uses, a packing material is used in the column instead of trays when low pressure drops across the column are required. Other factors that favor packing are: vacuum systems, smaller diameter columns, corrosive systems, systems prone to foaming, systems requiring low liquid holdup, and batch distillation. Conversely, factors that favor plate columns are: presence of solids in feed, high liquid rates, large column diameters, complex columns, columns with wide feed composition variation, columns with a chemical reaction, absorption columns, columns limited by foundation weight tolerance, low liquid rate, large turn-down ratio and those processes subject to process surges.

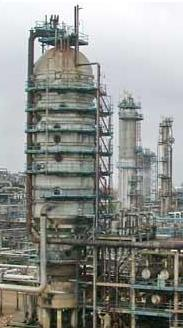
Large-scale, industrial vacuum distillation column

This packing material can either be random or dumped packing (25–76 millimetres (1–3 in) wide) such as Raschig rings or structured sheet metal. Liquids tend to wet the surface of the packing and the vapors pass across this wetted surface, where mass transfer takes place. Unlike conventional tray distillation in which every tray represents a separate point of vapor–liquid equilibrium, the vapor–liquid equilibrium curve in a packed column is continuous. However, when modeling packed columns, it is useful to compute a number of "theoretical stages" to denote the separation efficiency of the packed column with respect to more traditional trays. Differently shaped packings have different surface areas and void space between packings. Both these factors affect packing performance.

Another factor in addition to the packing shape and surface area that affects the performance of random or structured packing is the liquid and vapor distribution entering the packed bed. The number of theoretical stages required to make a given separation is calculated using a specific vapor to liquid ratio. If the liquid and vapor are not evenly distributed across the superficial tower area as it enters the packed bed, the liquid to vapor ratio will not be correct in the packed bed and the required separation will not be achieved. The packing will appear to not be working properly. The height equivalent to a theoretical plate (HETP) will be greater than expected. The problem is not the packing itself but the mal-distribution of the fluids entering the packed bed. Liquid mal-distribution is more frequently the problem than vapor. The design of the liquid distributors used to introduce the feed and reflux to a packed bed is critical to making the packing perform to it maximum efficiency. Methods of evaluating the effectiveness of a liquid distributor to evenly distribute the liquid entering a packed bed can be found in references. Considerable work has been done on this topic by Fractionation Research, Inc. (commonly known as FRI).

=== Multi-effect distillation ===
The goal of multi-effect distillation is to increase the energy efficiency of the process, for use in desalination, or in some cases one stage in the production of ultrapure water. The number of effects is inversely proportional to the kW·h/m^{3} of water recovered figure and refers to the volume of water recovered per unit of energy compared with single-effect distillation. One effect is roughly 636 kW·h/m^{3}:

- Multi-stage flash distillation can achieve more than 20 effects with thermal energy input, as mentioned in the article.
- Vapor compression evaporation – Commercial large-scale units can achieve around 72 effects with electrical energy input, according to manufacturers.

There are many other types of multi-effect distillation processes, including one referred to as simply multi-effect distillation (MED), in which multiple chambers, with intervening heat exchangers, are employed.

== In food processing ==
=== Beverages ===
Carbohydrate-containing plant materials are allowed to ferment, producing a dilute solution of ethanol in the process. Spirits such as whiskey and rum are prepared by distilling these dilute solutions of ethanol. Components other than ethanol, including water, esters, and other alcohols, are collected in the condensate, which account for the flavor of the beverage. Some of these beverages are then stored in wooden barrels or other containers from which they acquire more flavor compounds and characteristic flavors.

== Gallery ==
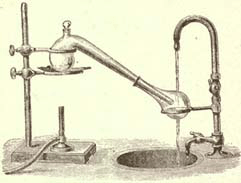
Chemistry in its beginnings used retorts as laboratory equipment exclusively for distillation processes.

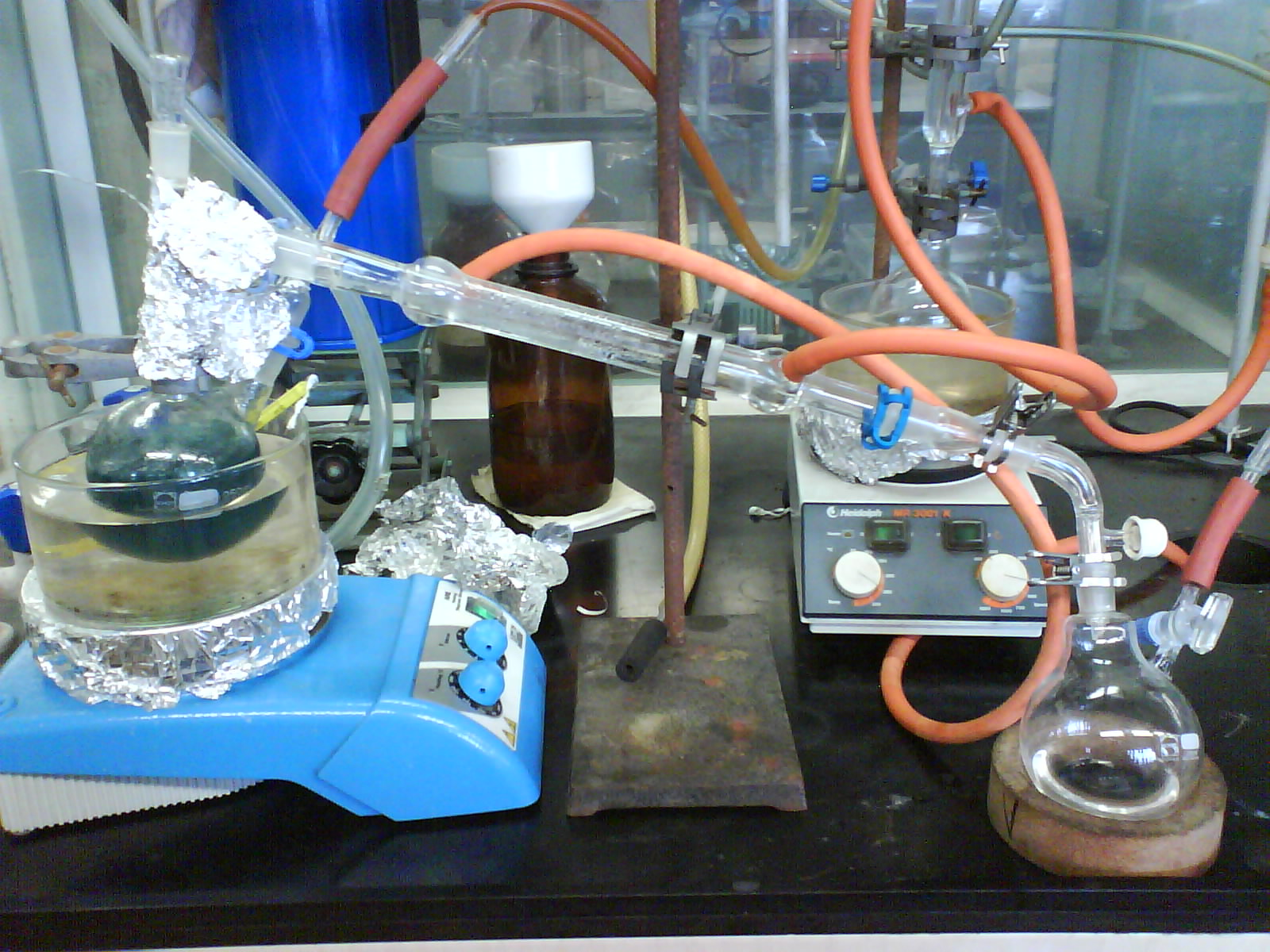
A simple set-up to distill dry and oxygen-free toluene.

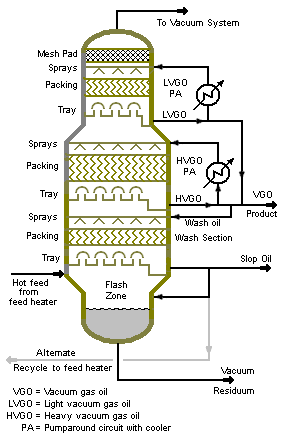
Diagram of an industrial-scale vacuum distillation column as commonly used in oil refineries

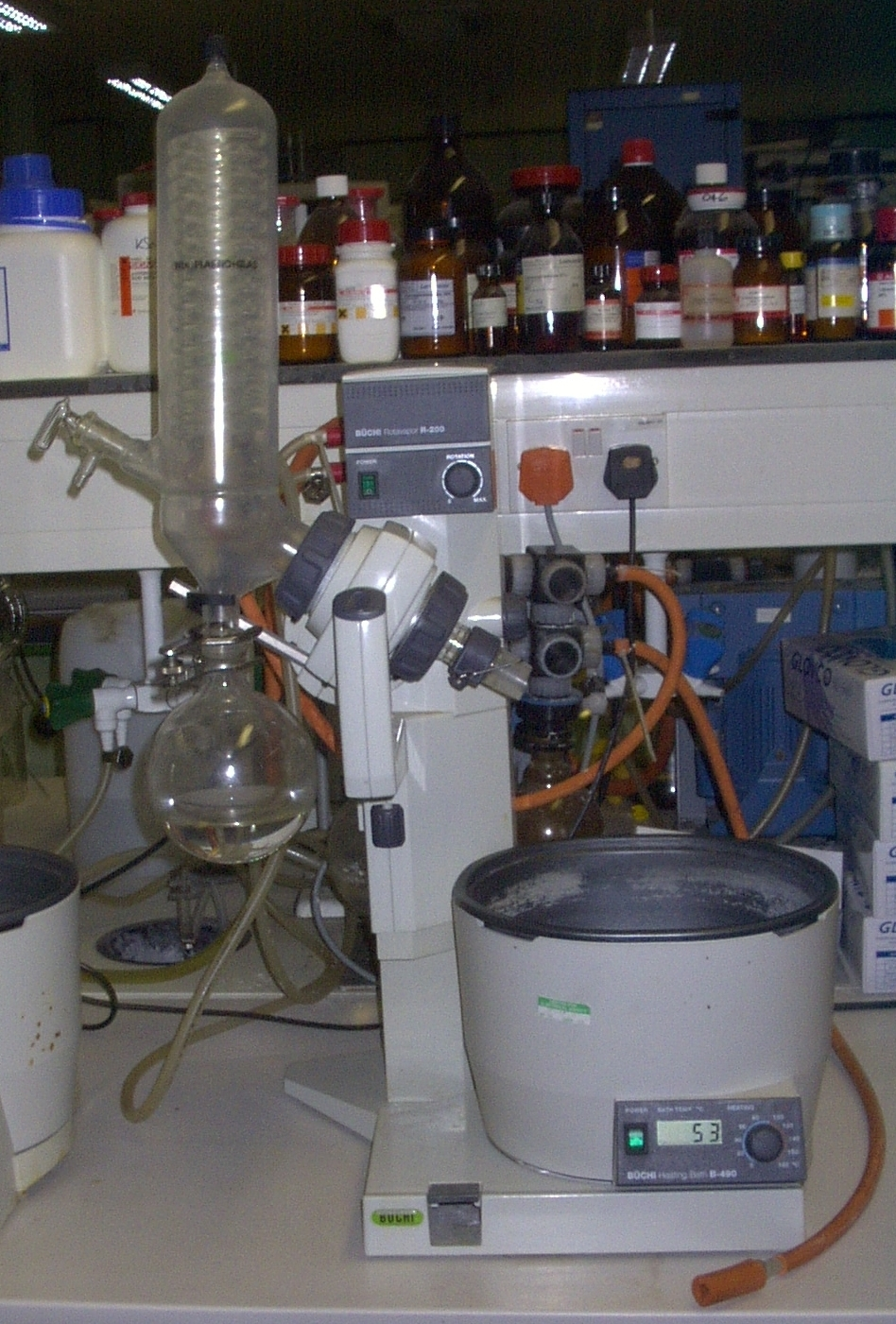
A rotary evaporator is able to distill solvents more quickly at lower temperatures through the use of a vacuum.

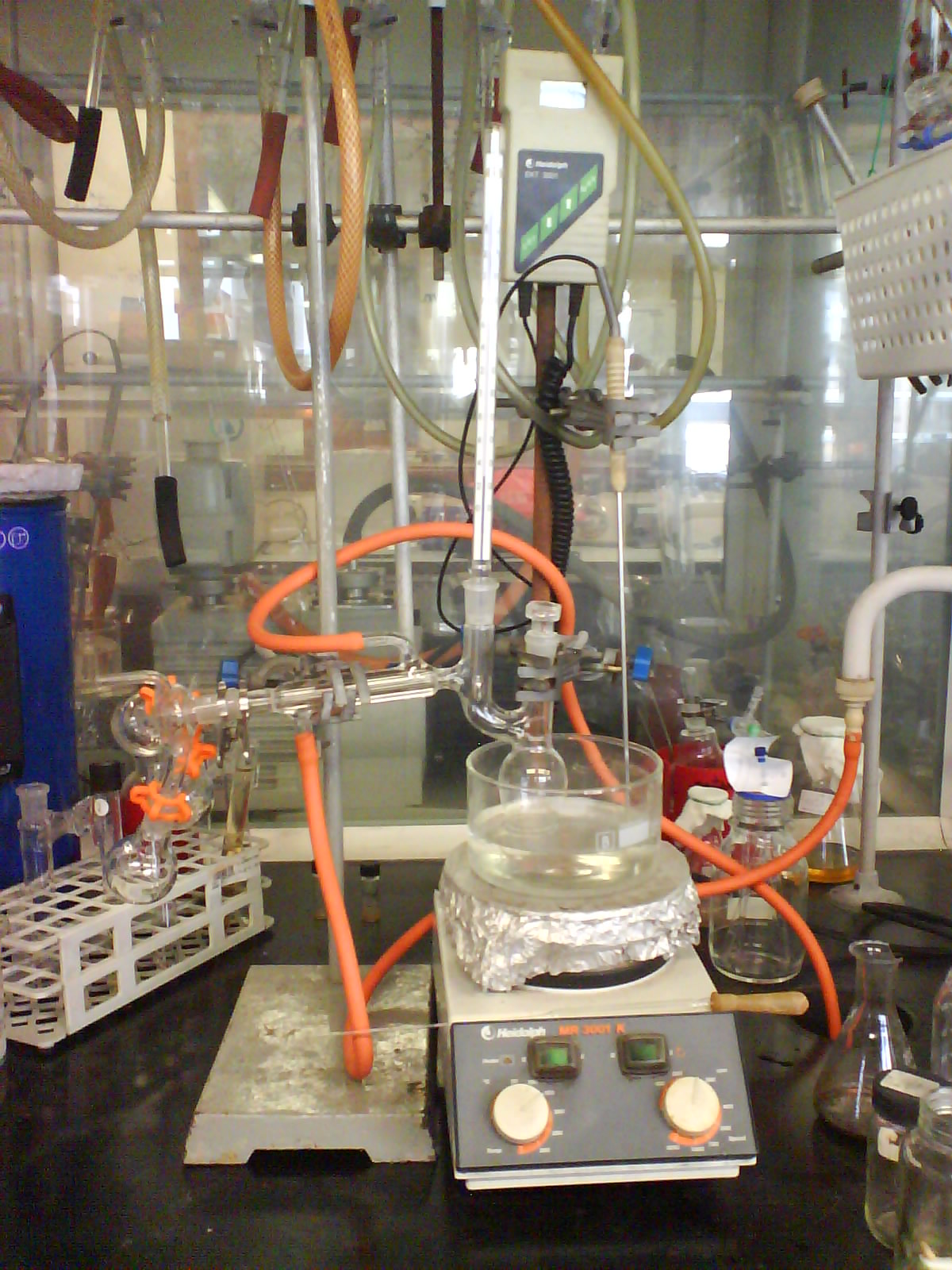
Distillation using semi-microscale apparatus. The jointless design eliminates the need to fit pieces together. The pear-shaped flask allows the last drop of residue to be removed, compared with a similarly sized round-bottom flask. The small holdup volume prevents losses. A "pig" is used to channel the various distillates into three receiving flasks. If necessary the distillation can be carried out under vacuum using the vacuum adapter at the pig.

== See also ==
- Atmospheric distillation of crude oil
- Clyssus
- Fragrance extraction
- Low-temperature distillation
- Microdistillery
- Sublimation
- Dixon rings
- Random column packing
