= The Green Tree Distillery =

Distillery in the Czech Republic

- Type: Private
- Industry: Drink industry
- Founded: 4 July 1518; 508 years ago in Prostějov, Czech Republic
- Headquarters: Ústí nad Labem, Czech Republic
- Key people: Milan Hagan
- Website: www.palirnauzelenehostromu.cz

The Green Tree Distillery (Czech: Palírna U Zeleného stromu) is a Czech company run by the Hagan family. According to Forbes, it is the largest family-owned distillery in the Czech Republic.

Its manufacturing portfolio includes more than a hundred products. Among its most famous brands are the Old Hunter´s Rye, Heffron rum, B42V ECCENTRIC VODKA, and Hanácká vodka. Production today takes place exclusively in Prostějov, the company's headquarters are in Ústí nad Labem.

In 2018, the company celebrated its 500th anniversary. It is unique not only in the Czech Republic, but also in the whole of Europe, where there is no distillery with a longer history. Even without foreign capital, it is the second largest producer of spirits in the Czech Republic.

== History ==
=== Origin ===
On 4 July 1518 William of Pernštejn granted the brewing rights for thirty-one house owners in Prostějov. Among them was Hajný Jež of Seloutek, owner of the house The Green Tree.

=== Brewing rights ===
Charles of Liechtenstein extended the right to brew to the owners of the Schenker houses by a monopoly on the distillation and infusion of liquor.

The distillery survived not only the difficult period of the Thirty Years' War, the shortage of raw materials, and the looting of soldiers, but also the subsequent epidemics that almost depopulated the town. It also survived 1697, when Prostějov suffered the most destructive fire in its history and half of the town was destroyed. However, the famous house with the depiction of the green tree miraculously remained intact. This year was also the beginning of the economic recession. The distillery began to prosper again in 1735 with the arrival of a new owner, Michael Storch of Markvartice. He, as a pharmacist, began adding herbs and spices, especially anise, to the mash, thus laying the foundations for the famous Starorežná recipe.

=== Distillery in its golden age ===
At the beginning of the 19th century, Prostějov became the leading producer of spirits in Moravia with a total production of over 11,000 hectolitres. However, the real boom came in 1843, when the distillery was bought by a new owner, Jakub Vojáček. Under his management, the distillery's production reached its peak.

After the purchase of the house at auction, the distillery was officially upgraded to a factory. Vojáček was inspired by the production of the famous whisky and improved the distillation processes. The oak barrels in which Vojáček's brandy was matured are still in use today. After his death in 1858, the distillery, called J. Wojaczek, Liquer- und Rum-Fabrik, Prossnitz, was taken over by his family, who founded the business company "J. Vojáček Heirs". Under this name, the Vojáček family continued to run the distillery during the difficult years of the First World War, when they were unable to win lucrative army contracts. However, thanks to their perseverance, the Vojáček family became successful entrepreneurs.

In 1925, the distillery and The Green Tree House became the property of the "Cooperative Enterprise of Innkeepers", which brought together businesses from the Haná metropolis and other areas. The symbol of a green tree with the silhouette of the city of Prostějov in the background began to appear on advertising signs.

=== War and nationalisation ===
The beginning of World War II marked a period of increased production and considerable success for the distillery. The significant increase in sales was the result of a merger with a self-help cooperative of innkeepers in 1939, which focused mainly on the production of soft drinks. The company virtually doubled in size. In 1940, the turnover exceeded 13 million crowns, which was an extremely high figure at that time.

In 1941, due to the high consumption of alcohol for war purposes, rationing was introduced. The company tried to compensate for the shortage of alcohol by increasing the production of sodas and soft drinks. However, the Gestapo informed the company that it was secretly hiding stocks of spirits. The Green Tree distillery was subsequently raided and searched. Fortunately, thanks to the cohesiveness and courage of all the employees, the inspection went well.

In 1946, the company was nationalised and by September it was operating as a national enterprise.

=== Post-revolution period ===
The political and social changes in the republic in 1992 enabled the privatization of Starorežná Prostějov. At that time, the company produced an impressive 60 types of spirits with a production of 13 million litres.

In 2011, the Green Tree Distillery–Starorežná Prostějov merged with the Ústí liquor company GRANETTE (formerly known as KB Likér or the Eckelmann brothers' liquor company), with all production concentrated in Prostějov. The newly established company, GRANETTE & STAROREŽNÁ Distilleries, Inc., became the largest producer of spirits in the Czech Republic with purely Czech capital and one of the most important players on the Czech market.

In 2017, the company renewed its historical name "The Green Tree Distillery, Inc.", which dates back to 1518. This step continued the almost 500-year-old tradition of distilling in Prostějov.

== Present day distillery ==
=== 2018 ===
- In 2018, the distillery celebrated its 500th anniversary. To mark this special occasion, the first limited and collector's edition Old Hunter´s Rye Single Barrel was created, of which only 500 were produced.

=== 2019 ===
- The Heffron brand was launched – a genuine cane rum from Panama.
- The company launched a campaign with Matěj Ruppert on the Hanácká vodka brand.

=== 2020 ===
- Jiří Bartoška became the face of Old Hunter´s Rye and the company made a TV spot with him.

=== 2022 ===
- On the occasion of the 504th anniversary of the distillery, Jiří Bartoška christened a limited edition twelve-year-old whisky.
- The company launched two new whiskies: Tuzemák Objevitel, which contains floral honey, and Hanácká Trendy, which is only 30% alcohol.

=== 2023 ===
- The distillery decided to support the craft in Ukraine and established cooperation with a Ukrainian glassworks from the town of Zorya.
- Matěj Ruppert made the third TV spot for Hanácká vodka.
- The company partnered with the Rock for People festival through its Hanácká vodka.
- The company commissioned a unique limited edition label for Old Hunter´s Rye. Its author is illustrator Marek Ehrenberger. The label was produced only in 1,518 pieces to commemorate the year of the founding of the Prostějov's Green Tree Distillery.

The average annual production of the company is 100 thousand hectolitres of alcoholic beverages. The distillery invests its profits in innovation and in expanding its portfolio. The products of the Green Tree Distillery are available to customers in twenty other countries on five continents. Exports account for almost 12% of its total alcohol production.

== Products ==
The distillery produces its own spirits and also matures imported spirits in wooden barrels. The flagship products are Old Hunter´s Rye (3 product lines), Heffron rum, Hanácká vodka, B42V vodka, and Vaječný sen.

=== Old Hunter´s Rye whiskey ===
Old Hunter's Rye is one of the most popular brands of spirits in the Czech Republic. It consistently ranks in the top five best-selling spirit brands.

The Old Hunter’s brand is based on a rye spirit, aged in oak barrels. The brand has a long history, with origins that may date back to the early 16th century. It has maintained its commitment to traditional production processes, adhering to an original Czech recipe. Originally called Alter Korn (Old Rye), the brand gained the nickname ‘Hunter’s’ thanks to its label, featuring a green camisole and hat. Notable products include the Reserve (4YO) and Selection (7YO) whiskies.

The original recipe is kept classified and securely stored in a vault, with access limited to three individuals.

Old Hunter’s Rye Whiskey has earned accolades at international exhibitions, winning gold medals in London, Hong Kong, Warsaw, Vitoria (Spain), and Japan.

=== Heffron ===
Heffron cane rum has been part of the range of the Czech distillery The Green Tree since 2019. The name of the rum preserves the idea of honouring Czechoslovak Legionnaires. Heffron was the ship that transported the legionnaires home from Panama. This ship became the visual symbol of the entire brand. It is a blend of imported five-year-old Panamanian rums with a "strength" of 38 percent. In 2023, the labels of the limited edition Heffron 5YO featured Czech aviators Karel Kuttelwascher, Josef František, and Alois Vašátko, who served in the British Royal Air Force during World War II. This was the fourth time the Heffron brand paid tribute to Czech courage.

=== Hanácká vodka ===
Hanácká vodka is one of the oldest vodkas in the world. It has been produced in the same town, Prostějov, for more than 500 years. Its production is characterised by the use of Prostějov water, high-alcohol spirit, and six-fold filtration through activated carbon. Interestingly, the stable quality of the product has historically been ensured by measuring the alcohol content with a densimeter using the silver Prague groschen. This fact is also the source of the name Hanácká vodka "Silver".

=== B42V Eccentric vodka ===
In early 2023, the company rebranded the original name BLEND 42 VODKA and renamed it B42V ECCENTRIC VODKA. The company did this to respond to current customer needs. The content and production process of the vodka remained unchanged. It is still a blend of three types of grain spirits, the ratio of which is adjusted to a unique 42% alcohol, and double filtration with fine coconut activated carbon.

== Notable awards ==
The company's products have received taste awards at major international competitions, facilitating the successful export of its brands.

- 2020: At the international competition in London, "The Spirits Business World Whisky Masters 2020", Old Hunter´s Rye won the highest possible Master award. It outperformed the world's finest producers in a competition of 73 selected whiskies.
- 2021: Heffron rum won a silver medal in the international "Design Award and Competition" in the Packaging Design Award 2020–2021 category.
- 2022: In a prestigious competition, Granette Premium Liqueur won the "Packaging of the Year" award for the most beautiful packaging for its premium liqueurs. The competition is organised by the Syba Packaging Institute and is certified by the global packaging organisation World Packaging Organisation.
- 2022: Old Hunter´s Rye Bourbon Cask Reserve whisky won a gold medal in the European blended whiskies category at The Spirits Business World Whisky Masters 2022 tasting competition.
- 2023: Old Hunter´s Rye won world gold at the Japan Awards with its Bourbon Cask Reserve variant and seven-year-old Selection in the whisky category.

== Events ==
In 2023, the company engaged in a critique of the consumption tax. It demands that the government measure all spirits producers by the same standards.

== See also ==
- List of companies of the Czech Republic
