= Spinning band distillation =

Technique used to separate liquid mixtures with similar boiling points

Spinning band distillation is a technique used to separate liquid mixtures which are similar in boiling points. When liquids with similar boiling points are distilled, the vapors are mixtures, and not pure compounds. Fractionating columns help separate the mixture by allowing the mixed vapors to cool, condense, and vaporize again in accordance with Raoult's law. With each condensation-vaporization cycles, the vapors are enriched in a certain component. A larger surface area allows more cycles, improving separation.

Spinning band distillation takes this concept one step further by using a spinning helical band made of an inert material such as metal or Teflon to push the rising vapors and descending condensate to the sides of the column, coming into close contact with each other. This speeds up equilibration and provides for a greater number of condensation-vaporization cycles.

== Applications ==
Spinning band distillation may sometimes be used to recycle waste solvents which contain different solvents, and other chemical compounds.

== See also ==
- Spinning cone
