= Catalytic distillation =

Catalytic distillation is a branch of reactive distillation which combines the processes of distillation and catalysis to selectively separate mixtures within solutions. Its main function is to maximize the yield of catalytic organic reactions, such as the refining of gasoline. The earliest case of catalytic distillation was thought to have dated back to 1966; however, the idea was officially patented in 1980 by Lawrence A. Smith, Jr. The process is currently used to purify gasoline, extract rubber, and form plastics.

== Catalysts ==
The catalysts used for catalytic distillation are composed of different substances and packed onto varying objects. The majority of the catalysts are powdered acids, bases, metal oxides, or metal halides. These substances tend to be highly reactive which can significantly speed up the rate of the reaction making them effective catalysts.

The shapes which the catalysts are packed onto must be able to form a consistent geometric arrangement to provide equal spacing in the catalyst bed (an area in the distillation column where the reactant and catalyst come into contact to form the products). This spacing is meant to ensure the catalysts are spread evenly within the column. The catalyst bed must be largely spacious (about 50% empty) so that any evaporated gaseous reactants may catalyze and form gaseous products. The catalyst bed must also be able to contract and expand as it may have to respond to pressure changes within the column.

Before the catalysts are packed onto the shape, they are first packed onto something porous like a cloth or wire mesh. The cloth may be made from cotton, fiberglass, polyester, nylon, or other similar materials. The mesh is generally made from aluminum, steel, or stainless steel.

In terms of shapes, catalysts are usually packed on rings, saddles, balls, sheets, tubes, or spirals. These shapes tend to be made from fiberglass, teflon, and nonreactive metals. Before the catalysts are introduced into the system, they are either bagged, attached on metal grills or screens, or placed on polymer foams.

== Process ==
Within the catalytic distillation column, liquid reactants are catalyzed while concurrently being heated. As a result, the products immediately begin to vaporize and are separated from the initial solution. By catalyzing and heating the reactants at the same instant, the newly formed products are rapidly boiled out of the system. With the lack of the products, Le Chatelier's principle comes into effect and forms new products from the reactants to replace the removed products. Since the products are continuously exiting, the system never reaches equilibrium. The continuous formation of products causes the reaction to achieve completion.

== Reflux ==
In most reactions carried out by catalytic distillation, the reactants are often more volatile than the products. Because of this, an internal recycling system, known as the reflux, is implemented right after the condenser (an area within the column where escaped gases are cooled down to liquids). The reflux transfers the concentrated vapor back to the catalyst area. The reflux also returns a portion of the condensed liquids to the column to ensure only the products with the lowest boiling points are captured. As the reflux returns impure mixtures, the catalysts are washed for a prolonged usage.

== Types of Reactions ==
Reactions within catalytic distillation columns include:

- dimerization - forming a single molecule from two monomers with weak or strong bonds.
- polymerization - forming a three dimensional molecule from multiple monomers.
- etherification - forming a molecule by bonding two CH_{n} groups (alkane) around an oxygen atom.
- esterification - forming a molecule from an acid with oxygen (oxoacid) and an OH group (hydroxyl) containing molecule.
- isomerization - changing the structure of a molecule without changing its individual elements and their respective quantities.
- alkylation - transferring a CH_{n} group from one molecule to another.
- hydrogenation - adding hydrogen atoms to a molecule.
- dehydrogenation - separating hydrogen atoms from a molecule.

== Improvements from two column distillation ==
In two column distillation, the obtaining the desired product calls for a column for catalysis and then a column for distillation. This means that the distillation company would have to fund the construction of two large columns as well as a method for transporting the contents of one column to another. With catalytic distillation, the company only needs to fund one column which eliminates both the cost for a second column and the cost to move chemicals from one column to another. This optimization cuts overhead costs to nearly half the original cost.

In addition to cutting costs, catalytic distillation is a milestone in efficiency and efficacy. Less time is spent because it is not necessary to move the contents from column to another. Also, the percent yielded from reactants to products increased in some reactions from 96-97% to 99.9%.
