= Principle (chemistry) =

Principle, in chemistry, refers to a historical concept of the constituents of a substance, specifically those that produce a certain quality or effect in the substance, such as a bitter principle, which is any one of the numerous compounds having a bitter taste.

The idea of chemical principles developed out of the classical elements. Paracelsus identified the tria prima as principles in his approach to medicine. In his book The Sceptical Chymist of 1661, Robert Boyle criticized the traditional understanding of the composition of materials and initiated the modern understanding of chemical elements. Nevertheless, the concept of chemical principles continued to be used. Georg Ernst Stahl published Philosophical Principles of Universal Chemistry in 1730 as an early effort to distinguish between mixtures and compounds. He writes, "the simple are Principles, or the first material causes of Mixts;..." To define a Principle, he wrote

A Principle is defined, à priori, that in a mix’d matter, which first existed; and a posteriori, that into which it is at last resolved. (...) chemical Principles are called Salt, Sulfur and Mercury (...) or Salt, Oil, and Spirit.

Stahl recounts theories of chemical principles according to Helmont and J. J. Becher. He says Helmont took Water to be the "first and only material Principle of all things." According to Becher, Water and Earth are principles, where Earth is distinguished into three kinds. Stahl also ascribes to Earth the "principle of rest and aggregation."

Historians have described how early analysts used Principles to classify substances:

The classification of substances varies from one author to the next, but it generally relied on tests to which materials could be submitted or procedures that could be applied to them. "Test" must be understood here in a double sense, experimental and moral: gold was considered noble because it resisted fire, humidity, and being buried underground. Camphor, like sulfur, arsenic, mercury, and ammonia, belonged to the "spirits" because it was volatile. Glass belonged among the metals because, like them, it could be melted. And since the seven known metals – gold, silver, iron, copper, tin, lead, and mercury – were characterized by their capacity to be melted, what made a metal a metal was defined by reference to the only metal that was liquid at room temperature, mercury or quicksilver. But "common" mercury differed from the mercuric principle, which was cold and wet. Like all other metals, it involved another "principle", which was hot and dry, sulfur.

Guillaume-François Rouelle "attributed two functions to principles: that of forming mixts and that of being an agent or instrument of chemical principles."

Thus the four principles, earth, air, fire, and water, were principles both of the chemist's operations and of the mixts they operated upon. As instruments they were, unlike specific chemical reagents, "natural and general," always at work in every chemical operation. As constituent elements, they did not contradict the chemistry of displacement but transcended it: the chemist could never isolate or characterize an element as he characterized a body; an element was not isolable, for it could not be separated from a mixt without re-creating a new mixt in the process.

== See also ==
- Sulfur-mercury theory of metals
