= Theodoros Pelecanos =

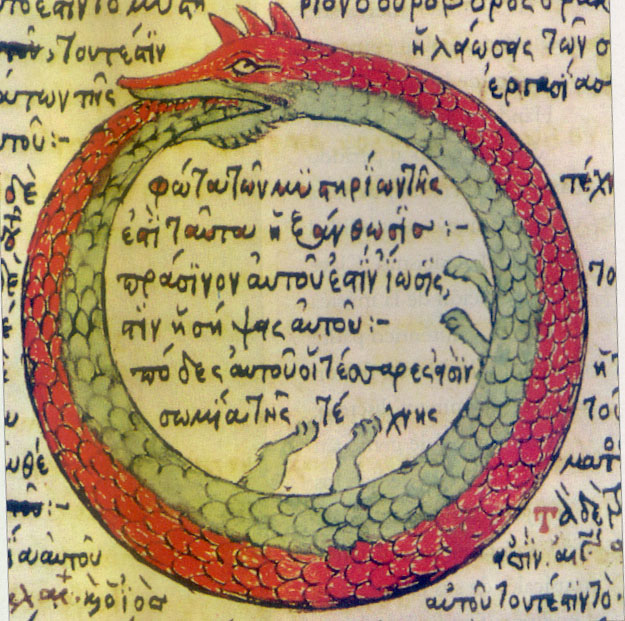
Drawing of the Ouroboros, 1478

Theodoros Pelecanos of Corfu was a 15th-century Greek scribe who is known only as the creator of a copy of a collection of medieval alchemical works.

In 1478, Pelecanos produced a manuscript now known as the Parisinus graecus 2327 and held in the Bibliothèque Nationale in France. As well as works of unknown origin, it contains copies of texts from the 11th century, in the time of Psellus. These sources are believed to include the Marcianus Graecus 299 manuscript of the 6th or 7th centuries, now in the Biblioteca Marciana, Venice.

The manuscript includes a copy of a lost tract by Synesius, the Synosius, that contains a well-known drawing of the Ouroboros, an ancient alchemical symbol which stands for eternity and the circle of life and death.
