= Condenser (laboratory) =

Laboratory apparatus used to condense vapors

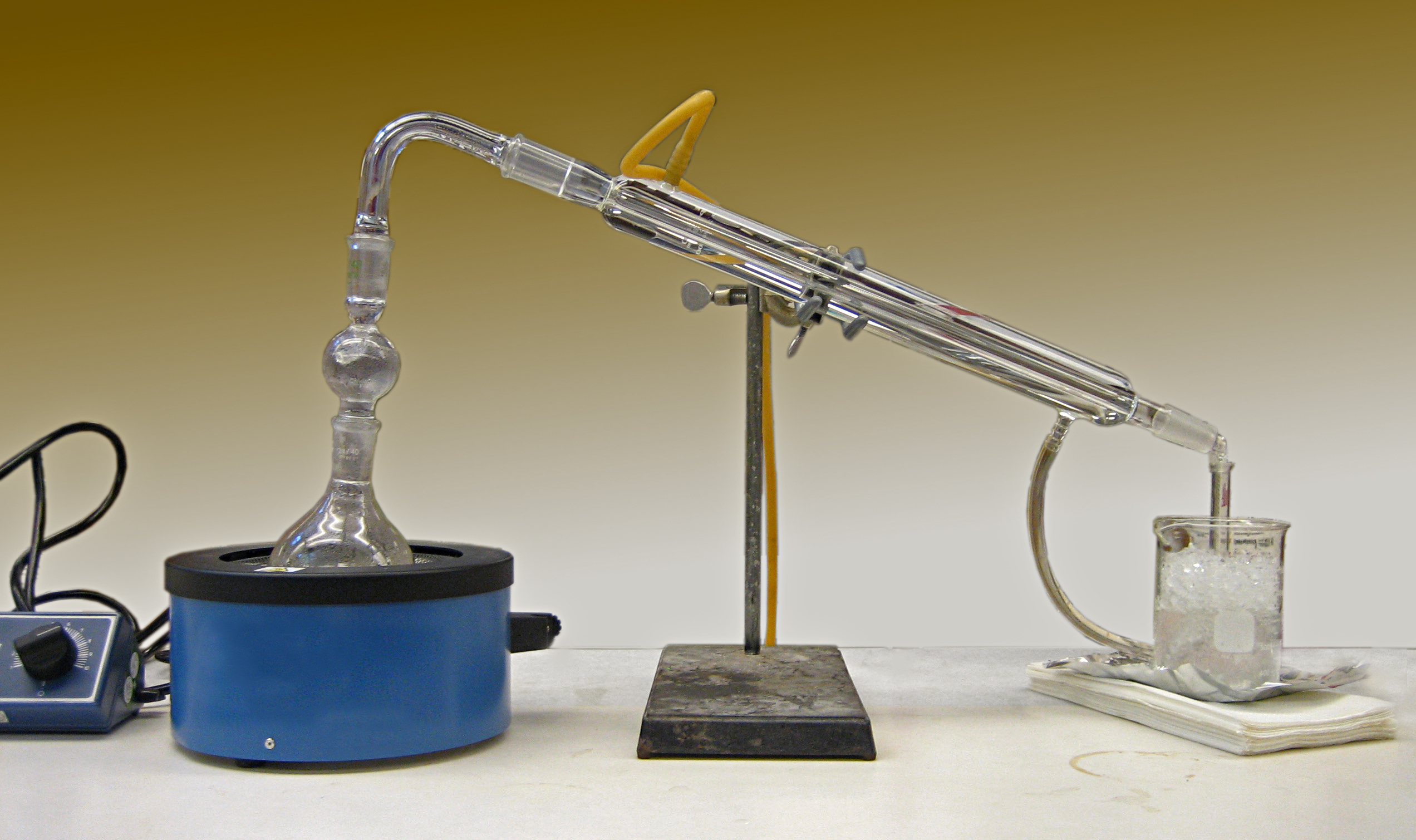
A distillation setup using a Liebig-type condenser (the tilted double-walled tube at the center). A liquid (not visible) in the flask at left is heated by the blue mantle to the boiling point. The vapor is then cooled as it goes through the inner tube of the condenser. There it becomes liquid again, and drips into the smaller collecting flask at right, immersed in a cooling bath. The two hoses connected to the condenser circulate water through the space between the inner and outer walls.

In chemistry, a condenser is laboratory apparatus used to condense vapors – that is, turn them into liquids – by cooling them down.

Condensers are routinely used in laboratory operations such as distillation, reflux, and extraction. In distillation, a mixture is heated until the more volatile components boil off, the vapors are condensed, and collected in a separate container. In reflux, a reaction involving volatile liquids is carried out at their boiling point, to speed it up; and the vapors that inevitably come off are condensed and returned to the reaction vessel. In Soxhlet extraction, a hot solvent is infused onto some powdered material, such as ground seeds, to leach out some poorly soluble component; the solvent is then automatically distilled out of the resulting solution, condensed, and infused again.

Many different types of condensers have been developed for different applications and processing volumes. The simplest and oldest condenser is just a long tube through which the vapors are directed, with the outside air providing the cooling. More commonly, a condenser has a separate tube or outer chamber through which water (or some other fluid) is circulated, to provide a more effective cooling.

Laboratory condensers are usually made of glass for chemical resistance, for ease of cleaning, and to allow visual monitoring of the operation; specifically, borosilicate glass to resist thermal shock and uneven heating by the condensing vapor. Some condensers for dedicated operations (like water distillation) may be made of metal. In professional laboratories, condensers usually have ground glass joints for airtight connection to the vapor source and the liquid receptacle; however, flexible tubing of an appropriate material is often used instead. The condenser may also be fused to a boiling flask as a single glassware item, as in the old retort and in devices for microscale distillation.

== History ==
The water-cooled condenser, which was popularized by Justus von Liebig, was invented by Weigel, Poisonnier, and Gadolin, and perfected by Göttling, all in the late 18th century. Several designs that are still in common use were developed and became popular in the 19th century, when chemistry became a widely practiced scientific discipline.

== General principles ==
Designing and maintaining systems and processes using condensers requires that the heat of the entering vapor never overwhelm the ability of the chosen condenser and cooling mechanism; as well, the thermal gradients and material flows established are critical aspects, and as processes scale from laboratory to pilot plant and beyond, the design of condenser systems becomes a precise engineering science.

=== Temperature ===
In order for a substance to condense from a pure vapor, the pressure of the latter must be higher than the vapor pressure of the adjacent liquid; that is, the liquid must be below its boiling point at that pressure. In most designs, the liquid is only a thin film on the inner surface of the condenser, so its temperature is essentially the same as of that surface. Therefore, the primary consideration in the design or choice of a condenser is to ensure that its inner surface is below the liquid's boiling point.

=== Heat flow ===
As the vapor condenses, it releases the corresponding heat of vaporization, that tends to raise the temperature of the condenser's inner surface. Therefore, a condenser must be able to remove that heat energy quickly enough to keep the temperature low enough, at the maximum rate of condensation that is expected to occur. This concern can be addressed by increasing the area of the condensation surface, by making the wall thinner, and/or by providing a sufficiently effective heat sink (such as circulating water) on the other side of it.

=== Material flow ===
The condenser must also be dimensioned so that the condensed liquid can flow out at the maximum rate (mass over time) that the vapor is expected to enter it. Care must also be taken to prevent the boiling liquid to enter the condenser as splattering from explosive boiling, or droplets created as bubbles pop.

=== Carrier gases ===
Additional considerations apply if the gas inside the condenser is not pure vapor of the desired liquid, but a mixture with gases that have a much lower boiling point (as may occur in dry distillation, for example). Then the partial pressure of its vapor must be considered when obtaining its condensation temperature. For example, if the gas entering the condenser is a mixture of 25% ethanol vapor and 75% carbon dioxide (by moles) at 100 kPa (typical atmospheric pressure), the condensation surface must be kept below 48 °C, the boiling point of ethanol at 25 kPa.

Moreover, if the gas is not pure vapor, condensation will create a layer of gas with even lower vapor contents right next to the condensing surface, further lowering the boiling point. Therefore, the condenser's design must be such that the gas is well-mixed and/or that all of it is forced to pass very close to the condensation surface.

=== Liquid mixtures ===
Finally, if the input to the condenser is a mixture of two or more miscible liquids (as is the case in fractional distillation), one must consider the vapor pressure and the percentage of the gas for each component, which depends on the composition of the liquid as well as its temperature; and all these parameters typically vary along the condenser.

=== Coolant flow direction ===
Most condensers can be divided in two broad classes.

The concurrent condensers receive the vapor through one port and deliver the liquid through another port, as required in simple distillation. They are usually mounted vertically or tilted, with the vapor input at the top and the liquid output at the bottom.

The countercurrent condensers are intended to return the liquid toward the source of the vapor, as required in reflux and fractional distillation. They are usually mounted vertically, above the source of the vapor, that enters them from the bottom. In both cases, the condensed liquid is allowed to flow back to the source by its own weight.

The classification is not exclusive, since several types can be used in both modes.

== Historical condensers ==
=== Straight tube ===
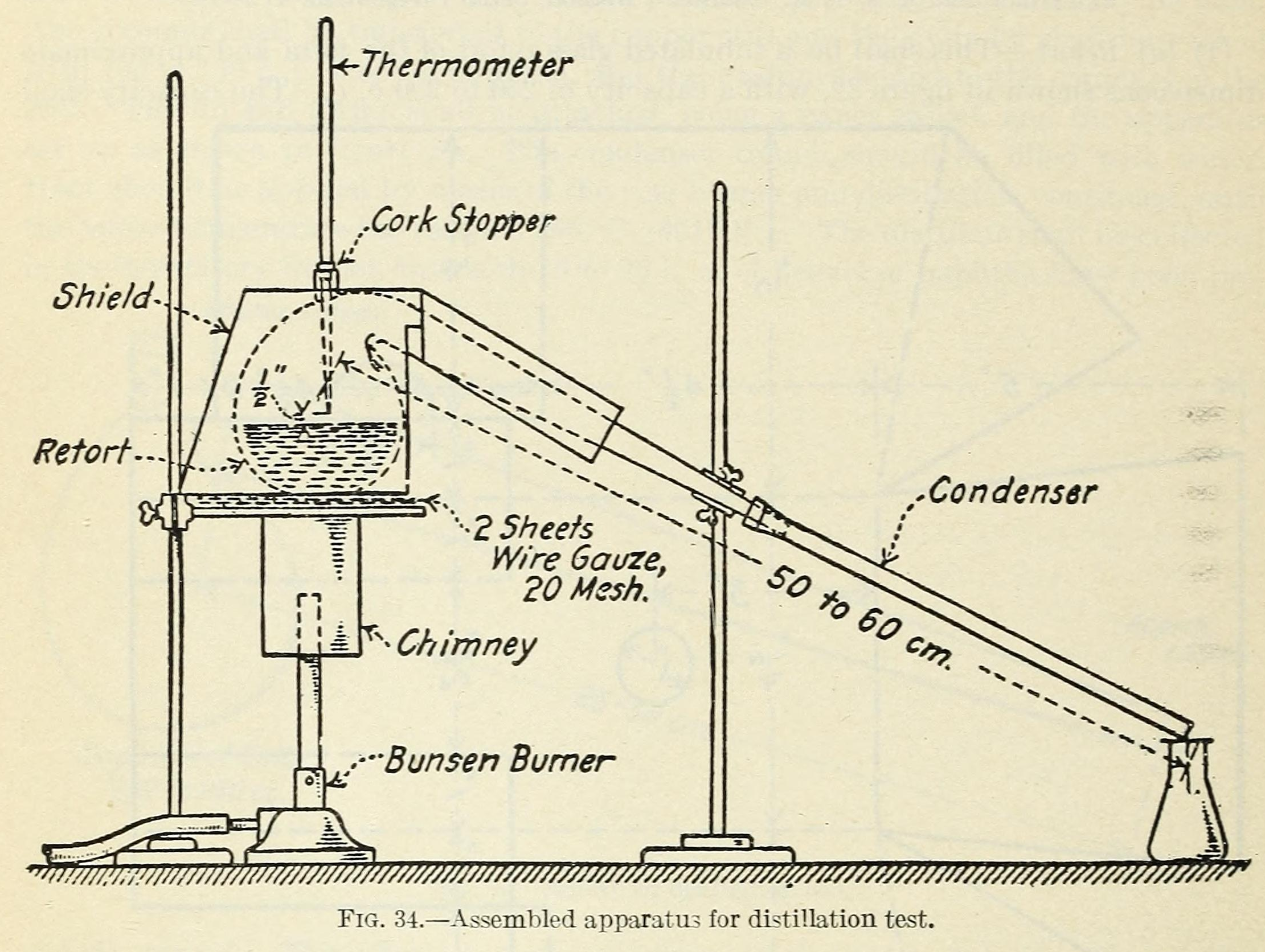
Distillation setup using a retort and tube condenser, from a 1921 book.

The simplest type of condenser is a straight tube, cooled only by the surrounding air. The tube is held in a vertical or oblique position, and the vapor is fed through the upper end. The heat of condensation is carried away by convection.

The neck of the retort is a classical example of a straight tube condenser. However, this kind of condenser may also be a separate piece of equipment. Straight tube condensers are no longer widely used in research laboratories, but may be used in special applications and simple school demonstrations.

=== Still head ===
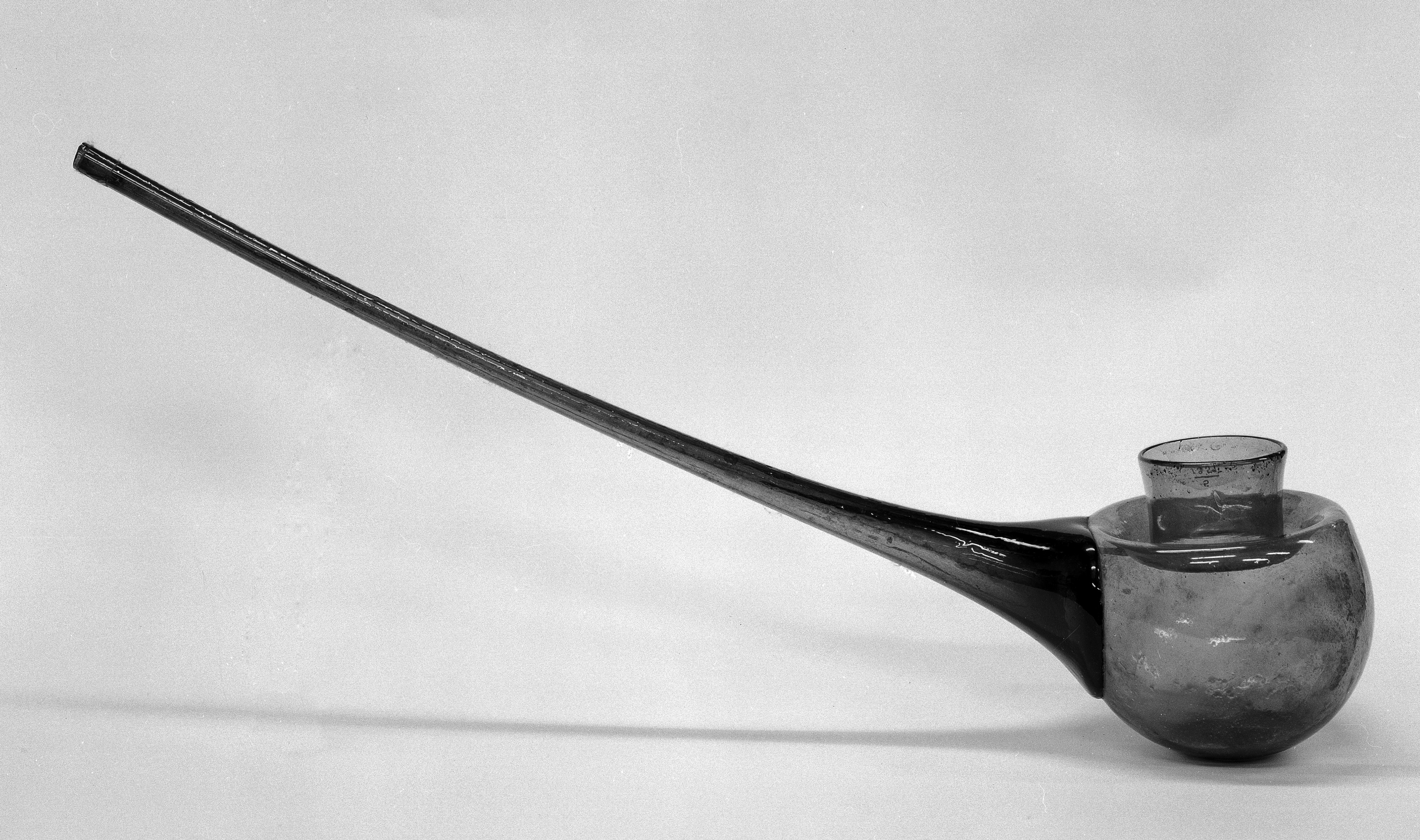
A glass still head, upside down. The rounded part was meant to be fitted on the top of the boiling flask. Black-and-white photo of object at the Wellcome Trust museum.

The still head is another ancient type of air-cooled condenser. It consists of a roughly globular vessel with an opening at the bottom, through which the vapor is introduced. The vapor condenses on the inner wall of the vessel, and drips along it, collecting at the bottom of the head and then draining through a tube to a collecting vessel below. A raised lip around the input opening prevents the liquid from spilling through it. As in the tube condenser, the heat of condensation is carried away by natural convection. Any vapor that does not condense in the head may still condense in the neck.

Still head type condensers are now rarely used in laboratories, and are usually topped by some other type of reflux condenser where most of the condensation takes place.

== Modern condensers ==
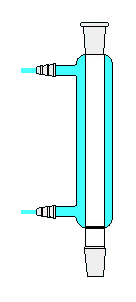
Liebig

Allihn

Graham

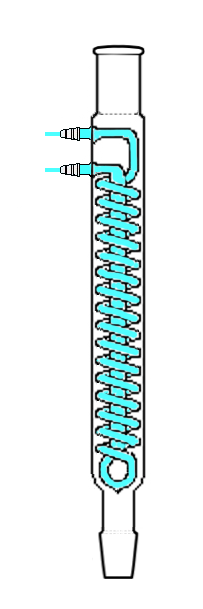
Dimroth

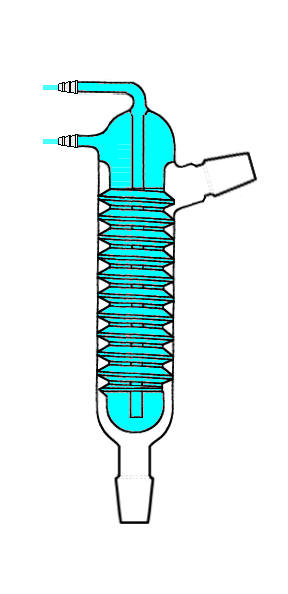
Friedrichs

Cold finger

Some common condensers.
The blue areas are circulating coolant

=== Liebig ===
The Liebig condenser is the simplest design with circulating coolant, easy to build and inexpensive. It is named after Justus von Liebig, who perfected an earlier design by Weigel and Göttling and popularized it. It consists of two concentric straight glass tubes, the inner one being longer and protruding at both extremities. The ends of the outer tube are sealed (usually by a blown glass ring seal), forming a water jacket, and is fitted with side ports near the ends for cooling fluid inflow and outflow. The ends of the inner tube, that carries the vapor and condensed liquid, are open.

Compared to the simple air-cooled tube, the Liebig condenser is more efficient at removing the heat of condensation and at maintaining the inner surface at a stable low temperature.

=== West ===
The West condenser is variant of the Liebig type, with a more slender design, with cone and socket. The fused-on narrower coolant jacket may render more efficient cooling with respect to coolant consumption.

=== Allihn ===
The Allihn condenser or bulb condenser is named after Felix Richard Allihn (1854–1915). The Allihn condenser consists of a long glass tube with a water jacket. A series of bulbs on the tube increases the surface area upon which the vapor constituents may condense. Ideally suited for laboratory-scale refluxing; indeed, the term reflux condenser often means this type specifically.

=== Davies ===
A Davies condenser, also known as a double surface condenser, is similar to the Liebig condenser, but with three concentric glass tubes instead of two. The coolant circulates in both the outer jacket and the central tube. This increases the cooling surface, so that the condenser can be shorter than an equivalent Liebig condenser. According to Alan Gall, archivist of the Institute of Science and Technology, Sheffield, England, the 1981 catalog of Adolf Gallenkamp & Co. of London (makers of scientific apparatus) states that the Davies condenser was invented by James Davies, a director of the Gallenkamp company. In 1904, Gallenkamp was offering "Davies' Condensers" for sale:. In 1920, Gallenkamp listed "J. Davies" as a director of the company.

=== Graham ===
A Graham or Grahams condenser has a coolant-jacketed spiral coil running the length of the condenser serving as the vapor–condensate path. This is not to be confused with the coil condenser. The coiled condenser tubes inside will provide more surface area for cooling and for this reason it is most favorable to use but the drawback of this condenser is that as the vapors get condensed, it tends to move them up in the tube to evaporate which will also lead to the flooding of solution mixture. It may also be called Inland Revenue condenser due to the application for which it was developed.

=== Coil ===
A coil condenser is essentially a Graham condenser with an inverted coolant–vapor configuration. It has a spiral coil running the length of the condenser through which coolant flows, and this coolant coil is jacketed by the vapor–condensate path.

=== Dimroth ===
A Dimroth condenser, also known as a spiral condenser, named after Otto Dimroth, is somewhat similar to the coil condenser; it has an internal double spiral through which coolant flows such that the coolant inlet and outlet are both at the top. The vapors travel through the jacket from bottom to top. Dimroth condensers are more effective than conventional coil condensers. They are often found in rotary evaporators which may use a more elaborate arrangement with several spirals. There also exists a version of Dimroth condenser with an external jacket, like in a Davies condenser, to further increase the cooling surface.

=== Cold finger ===
A cold finger is a cooling device in the form of a vertical tube that is cooled from the inside, that is to be immersed in the vapor while supported at the upper end only. This may be either flow-cooled, with both coolant ports at the top, or open-topped where liquid or solid coolant is simply placed inside. The vapor is meant to condense on the rod and drip down from the free end, and eventually reach the collecting vessel. A cold finger may be a separate piece of equipment, or may be only a part of a condenser of another type. Cold fingers are also used to condense vapors produced by sublimation in which case the result is a solid that adheres to the finger and must be scraped off, or as a cold-trap, where the liquid or solid condensate is not intended to return to the source of the vapor (often used to protect vacuum pumps and/or prevent venting of harmful gasses).

=== Friedrichs ===
The Friedrichs condenser (sometimes incorrectly spelled Friedrich's) was invented by Fritz Walter Paul Friedrichs, who published a design for this type of condenser in 1912. It consists of a large water-cooled finger tightly fitted inside a wide cylindrical housing. The finger has a helical ridge along its length, so as to leave a narrow helical path for the vapor. This arrangement forces the vapor to spend a long time in contact with the finger.

== Refluxing and fractional distillation columns ==
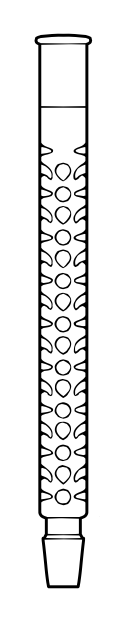
Vigreux

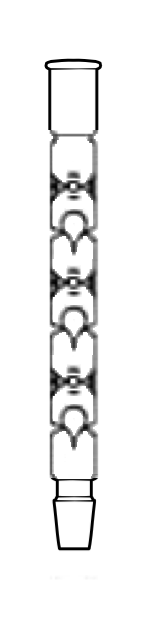
Snyder

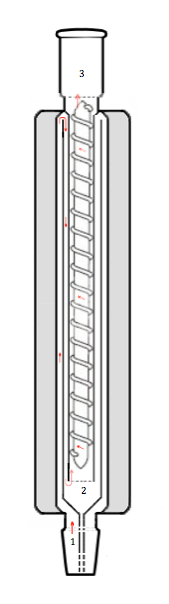
Widmer

Some common fractional distillation columns

=== Vigreux ===
The Vigreux column, named after the French glass blower Henri Vigreux (1869–1951) who invented it in 1904, consists of a wide glass tube with multiple internal glass "fingers" that point downwards. Each "finger" is created by melting a small section of the wall and pushing the soft glass inwards. The vapor that enters from the lower opening condenses on the fingers and drips down from them. It is usually air-cooled, but may have an outer glass jacket for forced fluid cooling.

=== Snyder ===
The Snyder column is a wide glass tube divided into sections (usually 3 to 6) by horizontal glass partitions or constrictions. Each partition has a hole, into which seats a hollow glass bead with an inverted "teardrop" shape. Vigreux-like glass "fingers" limit the vertical motion of each bead. These floating glass stoppers act as check valves, closing and opening with vapor flow, and enhancing vapor-condensate mixing. A Snyder column can be used with a Kuderna-Danish concentrator to efficiently separate a low boiling extraction solvent such as methylene chloride from volatile but higher boiling extract components (e.g., after the extraction of organic contaminants in soil).

=== Widmer ===
The Widmer column was developed as a doctoral research project by student Gustav Widmer at ETH Zurich in the early 1920s, combining a Golodetz-type arrangement of concentric tubes and the Dufton-type rod-with-spiral core. It consists of four concentric glass tubes and a central glass rod, with a thinner glass rod coiled around it to increase the surface area. The two outer tubes (#3 and #4) form an insulating dead air chamber (shaded). Vapor rises from a boiling flask into space (1), proceeds up through the space between tubes #2 and #3, then down the space between tubes #1 and #2, and finally up between tube #1 and the central rod. Arriving at space (3), vapor is then directed via a distillation head (glass branching adapter) to cooling and collection.

A so-called modified Widmer column design was reported as being in wide use, but undocumented, by L. P. Kyrides in 1940.

=== Packed ===
A packed column is a condenser used in fractional distillation. Its main component is a tube filled with small objects to increase the surface area and the number of theoretical plates. The tube can be the inner conduit of some other type, such as Liebig or Allhin. These columns can achieve theoretical plate counts of 1–2 per 5 cm of packed length.

A large variety of packing materials and object shapes has been used, including beads, rings, or helices (such as Fenske rings Raschig or Lessing rings) of glass, porcelain, aluminum, copper, nickel, or stainless steel; nichrome and inconel wires (akin to Podbielniak columns), stainless steel gauze (Dixon rings), etc. Specific combinations are known as Hempel, Todd, and Stedman columns.

=== Other ===
- Spinning band distillation uses a spinning helical band (spun by a motor) inside a straight tube to increase the mixing of the upgoing vapor and downcoming reflux liquid.
- Oldershaw columns have the same theory of operation as industrial plate columns. They are highly efficient for fractionating but they have significant holdup (the amount of liquid in the column during use) and their complexity makes them one of the more expensive types of glass column.
- Straight tube, or air condensers, which are just a straight tube, can be used as a crude reflux column.
- Pear columns consist of multiple bulbous segments shaped like inverted pears.

== Alternative coolants ==
Condensers with forced-circulation cooling usually employ water as the cooling fluid. The flow may be open, from a tap to a sink, and driven only by the water pressure in the tap. Alternatively, a closed system may be used, in which the water is drawn by a pump from a tank, possibly refrigerated, and returned to it. Water-cooled condensers are suitable for liquids with boiling points well above 0 °C, and can easily condense vapours with boiling points much higher than that of the water.

Other cooling fluids may be used instead of water. Air with forced circulation can be effective enough for situations with high boiling point and low condensation rate. Conversely, low-temperature coolants, such as acetone cooled by dry ice or chilled water with antifreeze additives, can be used for liquids with low boiling point (like dimethyl ether, b.p. −23.6 °C). Open-topped cold fingers can use a wider variety of coolants since they allow solids to be inserted, and can be used with water ice, dry ice, and liquid nitrogen.

== See also ==
- Condenser (heat transfer)
