= Falling-film column =

Laboratory equipment

A falling-film column (or wetted-wall column) is a kind of laboratory equipment used to achieve mass and heat transfer between two fluid phases (in general one gas phase and one liquid phase).

It consists of a vertical tube-shaped vessel: the liquid stream flows downwards through the inner wall of the tube and the gas stream flows up through of the centre of the tube.

== Description ==
Schematics of a typical falling-film column.

In the most common case, the column contains one liquid stream and one gas stream. The liquid forms a thin film that covers the inner surface of the vessel; the gas stream is normally injected from the bottom of the column, so the two fluids are subjected to a counter-current exchange of matter and heat, that happens through the gas-liquid interface.

Sometimes, the same equipment is used to achieve the co-current mass and heat transfer between two immiscible liquids.

== Applications ==
Because they are easy to model, falling-film columns are generally used as laboratory equipment, for example to measure experimentally the values of transport coefficients. A significant experiment was carried out in 1934 by Edwin R. Gilliland and Thomas Kilgore Sherwood that used a falling-film column to study the mass transfer phenomenon between a liquid phase and a gas phase, obtaining an experimental correlation between the Sherwood number, Reynolds number and Schmidt number.

Falling-film columns are not used at industrial scales, because they have a low surface area and liquid hold-up compared to other gas-liquid contactors (e.g. a packed column or a plate column).
