= Gas–liquid contactor =

Chemical equipment

A gas–liquid contactor is a particular chemical equipment used to realize the mass and heat transfer between a gas phase and a liquid phase. Gas–liquid contactors can be used in separation processes (e.g. distillation, absorption) or as gas–liquid reactors or to achieve both purposes within the same device (e.g. reactive distillation).

== Typologies ==
They are divided into two main categories:

- differential gas–liquid contactors: the mass transfer happens within the entire length of the contactor and the vapor–liquid equilibrium is not reached in any point of the equipment;
- stagewise gas–liquid contactors: the vapor–liquid equilibrium is reached within each stage of the equipment and mass transfer happens in a part only of the volume of each stage.

Examples of differential gas–liquid contactors are:

- falling-film column
- packed column
- bubble column
- spray tower
- gas–liquid agitated vessel.

Examples of stagewise gas–liquid contactors are:

- plate column
- rotating disc contactor
- Venturi tube.
Falling-film column

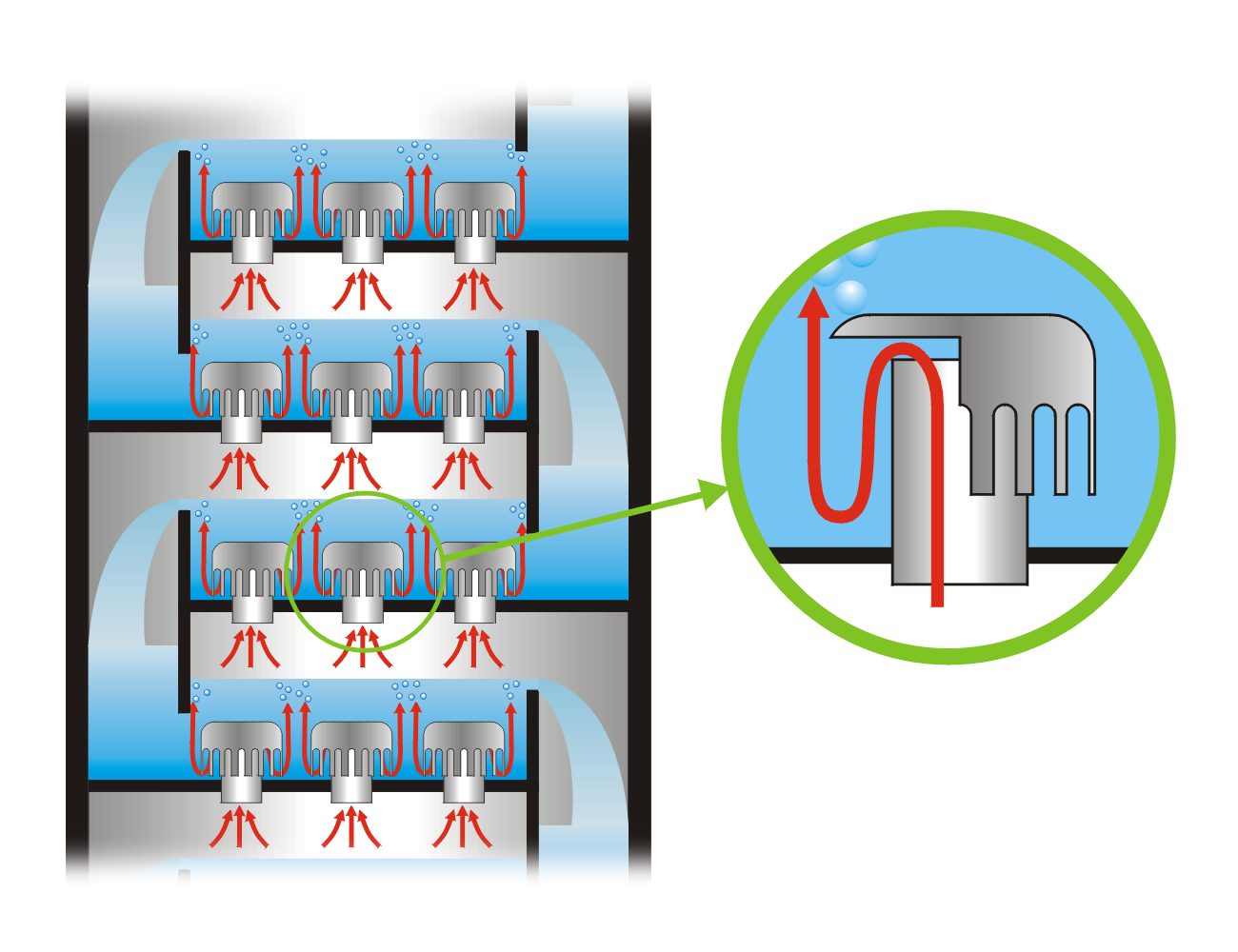
Plate column

Packed column

Bubble column

== Pro and cons ==
Some important factors to take into account to choice the typology of gas–liquid contactor more suitable for a particular application are:

- liquid hold-up
- surface area of the gas–liquid interface.

In particular heat and mass transfer velocity is higher for equipment with higher values of gas–liquid interface surface area, so gas–liquid contactors with high surface area (e.g. packed column, spray tower) are often preferred when it is important to lower the cost of the equipment.

Liquid hold-up is also an important factor for the economy of the process, because for low values of liquid hold-up a bigger equipment is needed to have the same heat and mass transfer velocity. For this reason, gas–liquid contactors with low liquid-hold-up (e.g. falling-film column) in general are not used at industrial scale.

== Bibliography ==
- Robert Perry, Don W. Green, Perry's Chemical Engineers' Handbook, 8th ed., McGraw-Hill, 2007. ISBN 0071422943
- Ghosal, Salil K.; Datta, Siddhartha (2011). Introduction to Chemical Engineering. Tata McGraw-Hill Education. ISBN 978-0074601402.
