= Stripping (chemistry) =

Physical separation process

Stripping is a physical separation process where one or more components are removed from a liquid stream by a vapor stream. In industrial applications the liquid and vapor streams can have co-current or countercurrent flows. Stripping is usually carried out in either a packed or trayed column.

== Theory ==
Stripping works on the basis of mass transfer. The idea is to make the conditions favorable for the component, A, in the liquid phase to transfer to the vapor phase. This involves a gas–liquid interface that A must cross. The total amount of A that has moved across this boundary can be defined as the flux of A, N_{A}.

== Equipment ==
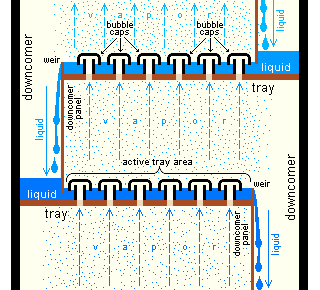
An example of a bubble cap tray that could be found inside of a stripping column

Stripping is mainly conducted in trayed towers (plate columns) and packed columns, and less often in spray towers, bubble columns, and centrifugal contactors.

Trayed towers consist of a vertical column with liquid flowing in the top and out the bottom. The vapor phase enters in the bottom of the column and exits out of the top. Inside of the column are trays or plates. These trays force the liquid to flow back and forth horizontally while the vapor bubbles up through holes in the trays. The purpose of these trays is to increase the amount of contact area between the liquid and vapor phases.

Packed columns are similar to trayed columns in that the liquid and vapor flows enter and exit in the same manner. The difference is that in packed towers there are no trays. Instead, packing is used to increase the contact area between the liquid and vapor phases. There are many different types of packing used and each one has advantages and disadvantages.

== Variables ==
The variables and design considerations for strippers are many. Among them are the entering conditions, the degree of recovery of the solute needed, the choice of the stripping agent and its flow, the operating conditions, the number of stages, the heat effects, and the type and size of the equipment.

The degree of recovery is often determined by environmental regulations, such as for volatile organic compounds like chloroform.

Frequently, steam, air, inert gases, and hydrocarbon gases are used as stripping agents. This is based on solubility, stability, degree of corrosiveness, cost, and availability. As stripping agents are gases, operation at nearly the highest temperature and lowest pressure that will maintain the components and not vaporize the liquid feed stream is desired. This allows for the minimization of flow. As with all other variables, minimizing cost while achieving efficient separation is the ultimate goal.

The size of the equipment, and particularly the height and diameter, is important in determining the possibility of flow channeling that would reduce the contact area between the liquid and vapor streams. If flow channeling is suspected to be occurring, a redistribution plate is often necessary to, as the name indicates, redistribute the liquid flow evenly to reestablish a higher contact area.

As mentioned previously, strippers can be trayed or packed. Packed columns, and particularly when random packing is used, are usually favored for smaller columns with a diameter less than 2 feet and a packed height of not more than 20 feet. Packed columns can also be advantageous for corrosive fluids, high foaming fluids, when fluid velocity is high, and when particularly low pressure drop is desired. Trayed strippers are advantageous because of ease of design and scale up. Structured packing can be used similar to trays despite possibly being the same material as dumped (random) packing. Using structured packing is a common method to increase the capacity for separation or to replace damaged trays.

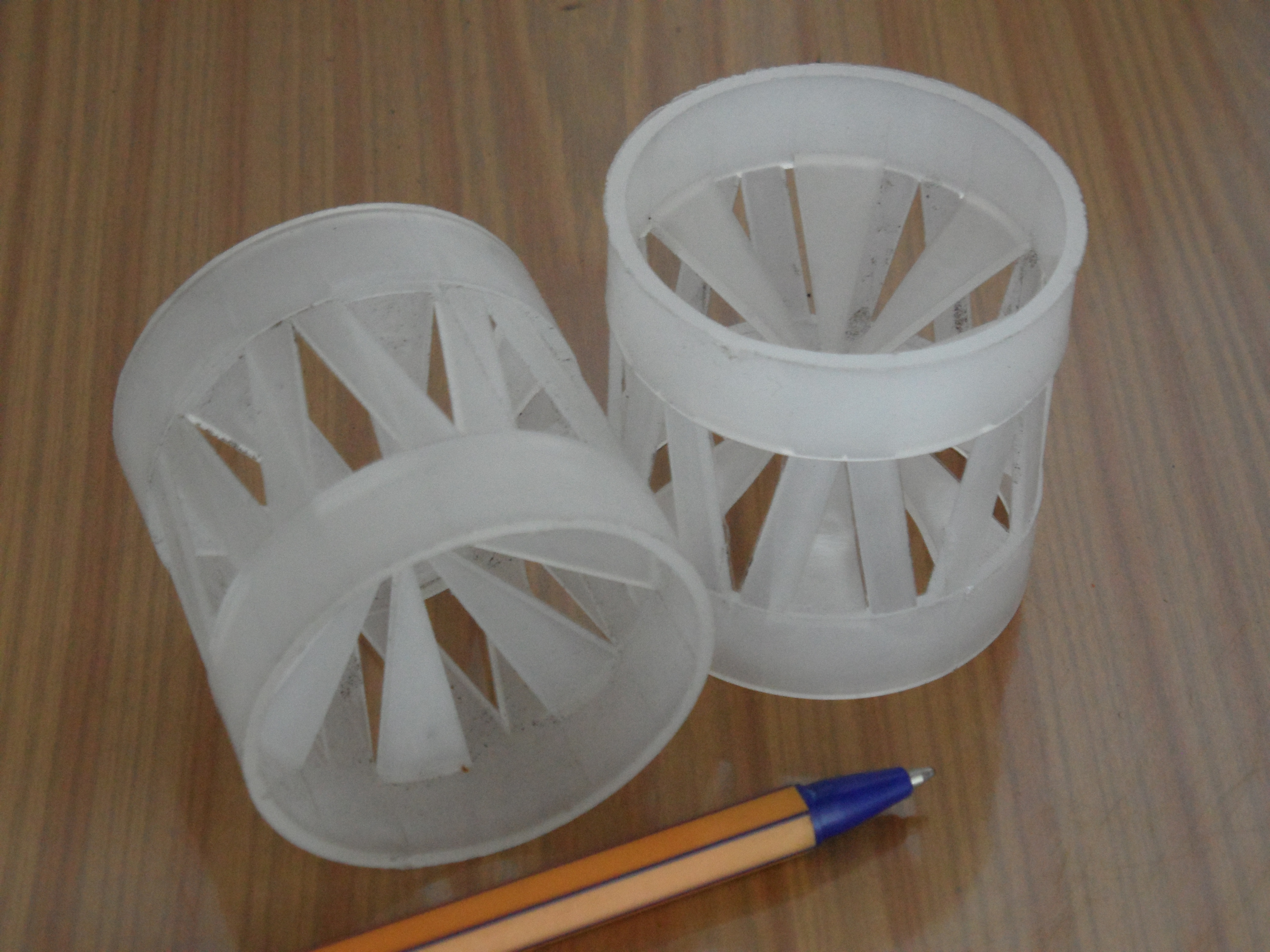
Plastic Białecki rings

Trayed strippers can have sieve, valve, or bubble cap trays while packed strippers can have either structured packing or random packing. Trays and packing are used to increase the contact area over which mass transfer can occur as mass transfer theory dictates. Packing can have varying material, surface area, flow area, and associated pressure drop. Older generation packing include ceramic Raschig rings and Berl saddles. More common packing materials are metal and plastic Pall rings, metal and plastic Zbigniew Białecki rings, and ceramic Intalox saddles. Each packing material of this newer generation improves the surface area, the flow area, and/or the associated pressure drop across the packing. Also important, is the ability of the packing material to not stack on top of itself. If such stacking occurs, it drastically reduces the surface area of the material. Lattice design work has been increasing of late that will further improve these characteristics.

During operation, monitoring the pressure drop across the column can help to determine the performance of the stripper. A changed pressure drop over a significant range of time can be an indication that the packing may need to be replaced or cleaned.

== Typical applications ==
Stripping is commonly used in industrial applications to remove harmful contaminants from waste streams. One example would be the removal of TBT and PAH contaminants from harbor soils. The soils are dredged from the bottom of contaminated harbors, mixed with water to make a slurry and then stripped with steam. The cleaned soil and contaminant rich steam mixture are then separated. This process is able to decontaminate soils almost completely.

Steam is also frequently used as a stripping agent for water treatment. Volatile organic compounds are partially soluble in water and because of environmental considerations and regulations, must be removed from groundwater, surface water, and wastewater. These compounds can be present because of industrial, agricultural, and commercial activity.

== See also ==
- Steam stripping (Similar concept, but more specialized to Refinery Operations )
- Continuous distillation
- Distillation
- Distillation Design
- Fractionating column
- Packed bed
- Steam distillation
- Theoretical plate
- Stripping Enhanced Distillation
