= Edwin R. Gilliland =

American chemical engineer (1909–1973)

Edwin Richard Gilliland
- Born: July 10, 1909; El Reno, Oklahoma
- Died: March 10, 1973 (aged 63); Belmont, Massachusetts
- Citizenship: American
- Education: University of Illinois; MIT
- Known for: Fractional distillation columns fluidized catalytic cracking
- Awards: E. V. Murphree Award (1959)
- Scientific career
- Fields: Chemical engineering
- Workplaces: MIT
- Doctoral advisor: Thomas Kilgore Sherwood
- Doctoral students: P. L. Thibaut Brian

Edwin Richard Gilliland (July 10, 1909 – March 10, 1973) was an American chemical engineer and Institute Professor at the Massachusetts Institute of Technology.

Gilliland was born on July 10, 1909, in El Reno, Oklahoma and moved with his family to Little Rock, Arkansas in 1918. He graduated from the University of Illinois at Urbana-Champaign with a B.S. in 1930 and an M.S. from the Pennsylvania State University in 1931. He received his Sc.D. from MIT in 1933 under the direction of Thomas Kilgore Sherwood for work on a wetted-wall column technique used in mass-transfer. With Professor Warren K. Lewis, Gilliland developed mathematical analyses of fractional distillation columns and both developed fluidized catalytic cracking techniques. He consulted extensively with Exxon, Merck, Goodyear, General Electric, and Nestle and also served as the president and CEO of Ionics, Inc. between 1946 and 1971.

Gilliland also held several appointed offices in public service. He was the assistant rubber director for the War Production Board between 1942 and 1944, deputy chief of the Chemical Engineering division of the National Defense Research Committee, deputy chairman of the Guided Missiles Committee on the Joint Chiefs of Staff, and the President's Science Advisory Committee under Presidents Kennedy and Johnson. He was elected to the National Academy of Sciences in 1948 and the National Academy of Engineering in 1965.

Gilliland married Ann Frances Miller in 1938 and had one daughter, Gail.
