= Thomas Kilgore Sherwood =

American chemical engineer

- Born: July 25, 1903; Columbus, Ohio, U.S.
- Died: January 14, 1976 (aged 72)
- Education: McGill University (BS, 1923); Massachusetts Institute of Technology (PhD, 1929)
- Known for: Mass transfer research
- Awards: Medal for Merit (1948); American Academy of Arts and Sciences (1948); National Academy of Sciences (1958); Founding member of the National Academy of Engineering (1964)
- Scientific career
- Fields: Chemical engineering, mass transfer
- Workplaces: Worcester Polytechnic Institute; Massachusetts Institute of Technology; University of California, Berkeley
- Thesis: The Mechanism of the Drying of Solids (1929)
- Doctoral advisor: Warren K. Lewis
- Notable students: Edwin R. Gilliland

Thomas Kilgore Sherwood (July 25, 1903 – January 14, 1976) was a noted American chemical engineer and a founding member of the National Academy of Engineering.

== Biography ==
Sherwood was born in Columbus, Ohio, and spent much of his youth in Montreal. In 1923 he received his B.S. from McGill University, and entered the Massachusetts Institute of Technology (MIT) for his Ph.D. His dissertation, "The Mechanism of the Drying of Solids," was completed in 1929, a year after he had become assistant professor at Worcester Polytechnic Institute. In 1930 he returned to MIT as assistant professor where he remained until his retirement, serving as associate professor (1933), professor (1941), and dean of engineering (1946–1952). In 1969 he retired from MIT to become professor of chemical engineering at the University of California, Berkeley.

Sherwood's primary research area was mass transfer, and in 1937 he published the first major textbook in the field, Absorption and Extraction, which was republished 1974 as Mass Transfer. The Sherwood number is named in his honor:

$\text{Sh} = \frac{K_c L}{\mathcal{D}}$

where

- $K_c$ = overall mass transfer coefficient;
- $L$ = characteristic length;
- $\mathcal{D}$ = component diffusion coefficient

His activities in World War II included organizing chemical engineers for the National Defense Research Committee (NDRC) in 1940; consulting to the Baruch Committee on synthetic rubber development (1942); serving as NDRC Section Chief for Miscellaneous Chemical Engineering Problems (1942), where he oversaw creation of new hydraulic fluids, antifouling coatings for ship bottoms, large smoke screen generators, etc.; and member of the Whitman Committee on jet propulsion (1944). In autumn 1944 he followed American troops into Europe to gather scientific intelligence. His industrial consulting work included efforts in seawater desalination, removal of sulfur dioxide from emissions, freeze-drying blood, and the manufacture of penicillin and vinyl acetate.

Sherwood received the U.S. Medal for Merit (1948), won major awards from the American Institute of Chemical Engineers and American Chemical Society, and was a member of the American Academy of Arts and Sciences (1948), a member of National Academy of Sciences (1958), and a founding member of the National Academy of Engineering (1964).

== Works ==
Sherwood, Thomas Kilgore; Pigford, Robert Lamar; Wilke, Charles R. (1975). Mass Transfer. New York: McGraw-Hill. ISBN 978-0-07-056692-7.
