= Kugelrohr =

Vacuum distillation apparatus

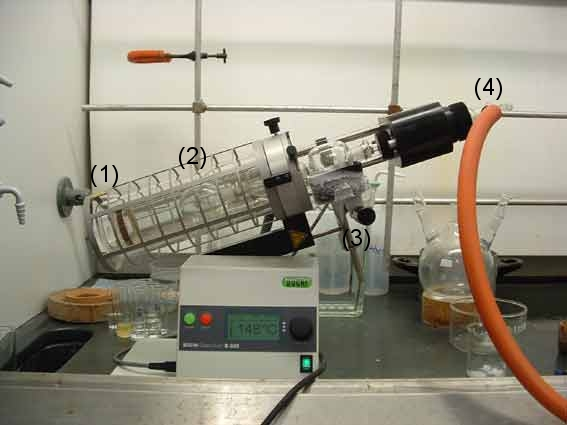
- 1. Heating band within insulating tube 2. Bulb containing item to be distilled 3. Cooling bath containing ice 4. Vacuum outlet and electric motor (to rotate ball-string)
- Uses: Distillation
- Related items: Vacuum distillation

A Kugelrohr (German for "ball tube") is a short-path vacuum distillation apparatus typically used to distill relatively small amounts of compounds with high boiling points (usually greater than 300 °C) under greatly reduced pressure.

== Design ==
"Short path" refers to the short distance that the vapors of the distillate need to travel, which helps reduce loss and speed up collection of the distillate. This type of distillation is generally performed under vacuum to prevent the compound from charring due to atmospheric oxygen, as well as to allow the distillation to proceed at a lower temperature.

The apparatus consists of a tube furnace or other electric heater controlled by a thermostat, and two or more bulbs connected with ground glass joints. The compound to be distilled is placed in the terminal bulb. The other bulbs can be used to collect the distillates sequentially, when the desired fraction is being collected the bulb is cooled with water or ice to aid condensation. A motor drive is often used to rotate the string of bulbs to reduce bumping, give even heating, and increase the surface area for evaporation.

== See also ==
- Distillation
- Short path distillation
- Vacuum distillation

== Gallery ==
A simple short path vacuum distillation apparatus can be used for bulb-to-bulb distillation. 1: Still pot with stirrer bar/anti-bumping granules 2: Cold finger - Condenser with maximum surface to condense most of the vapour. 3: Cooling water outlet 4: cooling water inlet 5: Vacuum Adapter 6: Receiving Flask.
