= P. L. Thibaut Brian =

American chemical engineer

Pierre Leonce Thibaut Brian (July 8, 1930 – April 2, 2018) was an American chemical engineer.

He was born in New Orleans and attended Louisiana State University. Upon graduation in 1951, Brian pursued a ScD in chemical engineering from the Massachusetts Institute of Technology under doctoral adviser Edwin R. Gilliland. Brian taught at MIT from graduation in 1956 to 1972, when he left for Air Products & Chemicals, where he served as vice president of engineering and on the company's board of directors. In 1975, Brian was named a member of the National Academy of Engineering for "contributions to both theory and engineering practice of desalination, mass transfer in chemically reactive systems, and the technology of liquefied gases." Later he was granted foreign fellowship into the Royal Academy of Engineering. Brian retired in 1994, remaining in Allentown, Pennsylvania. He died on April 2, 2018.
