= Short-path distillation =

Technique in chemistry

Short-path vacuum distillation apparatus with vertical condenser (cold finger), to minimize the distillation path; 1: Still pot with stirrer bar/anti-bumping granules 2: Cold finger – bent to direct condensate 3: Cooling water out 4: cooling water in 5: Vacuum/gas inlet 6: Distillate flask/distillate.

Short-path distillation is a distillation technique that involves the distillate traveling a short distance, often only a few centimeters, and is normally done at reduced pressure. Short-path distillation systems often have a variety of names depending on the manufacturer of the system and what compounds are being distilled within them. A classic example would be a distillation involving the distillate traveling from one glass bulb to another, without the need for a condenser separating the two chambers. This technique is often used for compounds which are unstable at high temperatures or to purify small amounts of compound. The advantage is that the heating temperature can be considerably lower at reduced pressure than the boiling point of the liquid at standard pressure, and the distillate only has to travel a short distance before condensing. A short path ensures that little compound is lost on the sides of the apparatus. The Kugelrohr is a kind of a short path distillation apparatus which can contain multiple chambers to collect distillate fractions. To increase the evaporation rate without increasing temperature there are several modern techniques that increase the surface area of the liquid such as thin film, wiped film or 'wiper' film, and rolled film all of which involve mechanically spreading a film of the liquid over a large surface.

== See also ==
- Fragrance extraction
