= Perkin triangle =

Chemistry apparatus specialized for the distillation of air-sensitive substances

- A Perkin triangle distillation setup: 1. Stirrer bar/anti-bumping granules 2. Still pot 3. Fractionating column, preferably vacuum-jacket insulated 4. Thermometer; 5. Teflon tap 1, distillate-collecting tap 6. Cold finger 7. Cooling-water outflow 8. Cooling-water inflow 9. Teflon tap 2, still isolation tap 10. Vacuum/gas inlet 11. Teflon tap 3, distillate-isolation tap 12. Still receiver
- Uses: Distillation
- Inventor: William Henry Perkin
- Related items: Vacuum distillation

A Perkin triangle is a specialized apparatus for the distillation of air-sensitive materials.

Some compounds have high boiling points and are sensitive to air. A simple vacuum distillation system can be used, whereby the vacuum is replaced with an inert gas after the distillation is complete. However, this is a less satisfactory system if one desires to collect fractions under a reduced pressure. To do this, a "pig" adapter can be added to the end of the condenser, or for better results or for very air-sensitive compounds, a Perkin triangle apparatus can be used.

The Perkin triangle uses a series of glass or Teflon taps to allow fractions to be isolated from the rest of the still, without the main body of the distillation being removed from either the vacuum or heat source, so that the reflux may continue. To do this, the sample is first isolated from the vacuum through the taps. The vacuum over the sample is then replaced with an inert gas such as nitrogen or argon. The collection vessel or still receiver can then be removed and stoppered. Finally, a fresh collection vessel can be added to the system, evacuated, and linked back to the distillation system through the taps to collect the next fraction. The process is repeated until all fractions have been collected.

== Solvent drying ==
A Perkin triangle is also a convenient device for drying solvents. The solvent can be allowed to reflux over a drying agent housed in the still pot (shown as 2 in the figure) for a suitable time to dry solvent. The collecting tap (shown as 5 in the figure) can then be opened to collect the solvent in a Schlenk flask for storage. Depending on the boiling point of the solvent, a vacuum can be applied.

== Reference textbook ==
- John Leonard; B. Lygo; Garry Procter (2 June 1994). Advanced practical organic chemistry. CRC Press. pp. 198–200. ISBN 9780748740710.
