= Fritz Walter Paul Friedrichs =

German chemist (1885–1958)

Fritz Walter Paul Friedrichs (28. July 1885, Stützerbach – 1958) (also published as Fritz Friedrichs) was a German chemist.

Fritz, was a son of Ferdinand and Olga Friedrichs, born Reinhardt. He is the inventor of the spiral cold finger-type condenser, now most commonly known as a Friedrichs condenser, which he described in a 1912 article published in the Journal of the American Chemical Society. Friedrichs was instrumental in the standardization of chemical apparatus in Europe.
