= Structured packing =

Materials used on the inside of a distillation column

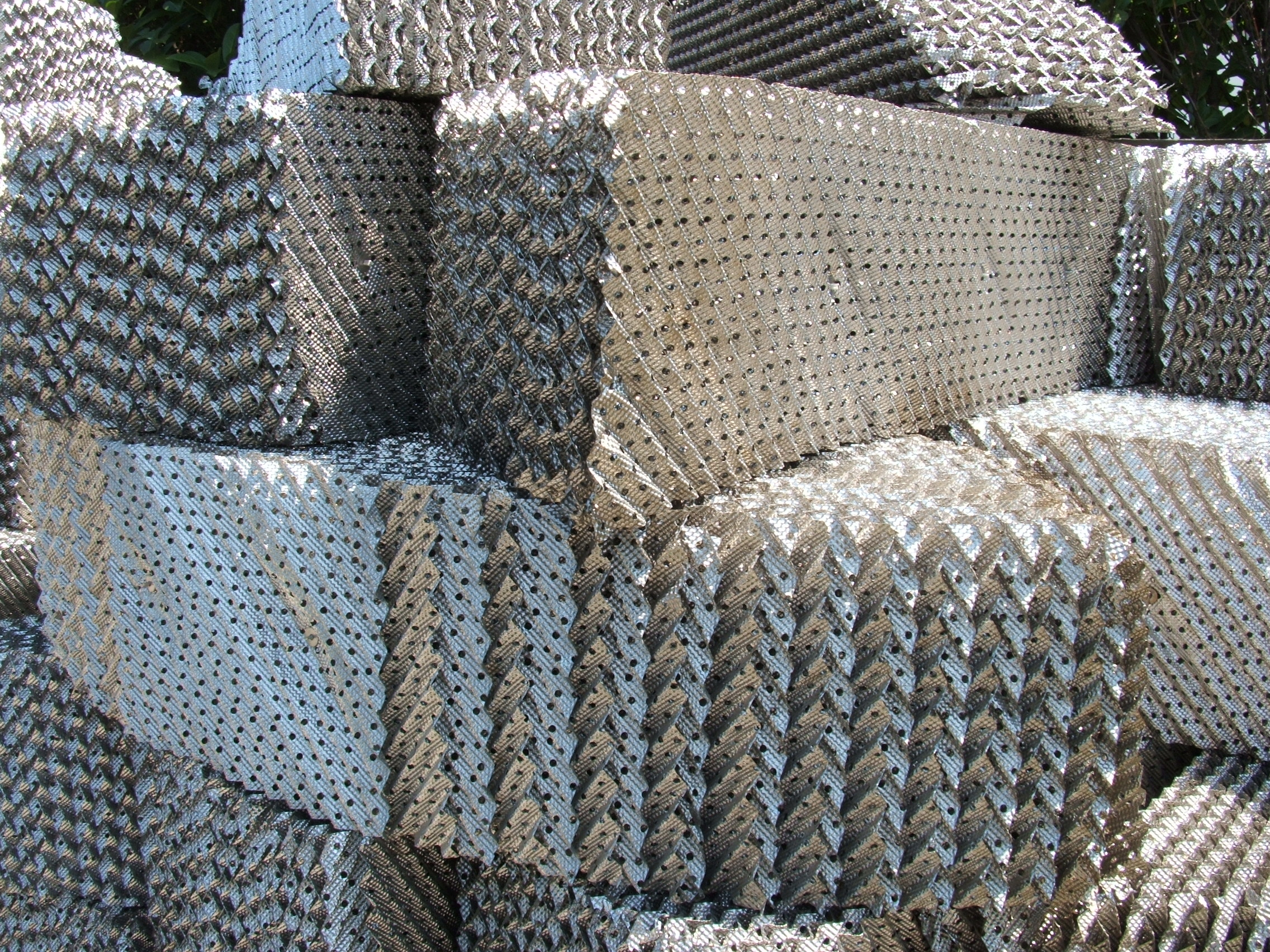
Structured packing

Structured packing is a range of specially designed materials for use in absorption and distillation columns. Structured packings typically consist of thin corrugated metal plates or gauzes arranged in a way that forces fluids to take complicated paths through the column, thereby creating a large surface area for contact between different phases.

Structured packing is formed from corrugated sheets of perforated embossed metal, plastic, or wire gauze. The result is a very open honeycomb structure with inclined corrugations or flow channels, giving a relatively high surface area but with very low resistance to gas flow. The surface enhancements are chosen to maximize liquid spreading. These characteristics tend to show significant performance benefits in low-pressure and low-irrigation-rate applications. Steeper or larger corrugation angles lower the pressure drop at the cost of lower separation efficiencies. The sheets are packaged into elements that are piled up in alternating layers, forming a packed bed that fills the complete cross-sectional area of the fractionation tower. To fully utilize the separation efficiency, structured packings require a careful distribution of the liquid on top of the bed. For the packings to reach their highest efficiency the variation in the liquid distribution should be less than 1–2%. In high purity applications with many equilibrium stages, the packing needs to be installed in multiple packed beds, between which the liquid is collected and re-distributed anew.

== History ==
Structured packings have been established for many decades and evolved from random column packing. The first generation of structured packing arose in the early 1940s. In 1953, a patented packing appeared named Panapak, made of a wavy-form expanded metal sheet. The packing was not successful, due to maldistribution and lack of good marketing. The second generation appeared at the end of the 1950s, with highly efficient wire mesh packings, such as Goodloe, Hyperfil and Koch-Sulzer. Until the 1970s, due to their low pressure drop per theoretical stage, those packings were the most widely used in vacuum distillation. However, high cost, low capacity and high sensitivity to solids have prevented wider utilization of wire mesh packings.

Corrugated structured packings, introduced by Sulzer by the end of the 1970s, marked the third generation of structured packed columns. These packings offer high capacity, lower cost, and less sensitivity to solids, while keeping a high performance. Popularity of the packings grew in the 1980s, particularly in air separation and for revamps in oil and petrochemical plants. These structured packings, made of corrugated metal sheets, had their surfaces treated, chemically or mechanically, to enhance their wettability. Consequently, the packings' wetted area increased, also for fluids that do not tend to wet surfaces very well, improving performance. In 1999, an improved structure of corrugated sheet packings, the Mellapak Plus, was developed based on CFD simulations and experiments. This packing had a new structure with a varying corrugation angle compared to the conventional Mellapak which had a single angle. This significantly lowered the pressure drop and increased the useful capacity.

== Varieties ==
Structured packing is manufactured in a wide range of sizes by varying the crimp altitude and corrugation angle (with respect to the horizontal). Two corrugation angles are common: 45 degrees "Y" packings and 60 degrees "X" packings. Commercial packing surface ranges from 50 m²/m³ (lowest efficiency, highest capacity) to 750 m²/m³ (highest efficiency, lowest capacity). The material thickness varies, for sheet metals the typical thickness ranges between 0.1 and 0.2 mm, whereas for plastic thickness ranges between 0.5 and 1 mm.

== Applications ==
Typical applications include fractionators in refinery and chemical process plants as well as in natural gas processing to remove sour gases and lower water content to prevent condensation in pipelines. Though structured packings also are applied in atmospheric and pressure applications, it is especially separations that are conducted under vacuum which benefit from the low pressure drop that structured packings provide. As such, structured packing replaced practically all trays in vacuum services. They have found their use in many kinds of industrial equipment and processes:

- Air separation
- Glycols
- Ethanolamines
- Styrene monomer
- Tall oil fractionation (separating fatty acids from rosin acids and pitch from the Kraft process of wood pulp manufacture
- Cyclohexanone/cyclohexanol separation
- Xylene splitters
- CO_{2} absorbers
- H_{2}S absorbers
- Ethylene oxide absorbers
- Acrylonitrile absorbers
- Oleo Chemicals (see oleochemistry)
- Fine Chemicals (that require vacuum distillation to prevent thermal degradation)

== Advantages ==
Structured packing offers the following advantages as compared to the use of random packing and trays:

- Lower pressure drop
- Higher efficiency (given the same tower height)
- Higher capacity
- Reduced liquid hold-up

== Disadvantages ==
Structured packing offers the following disadvantages as compared to the use of random packing and trays:

- Cost
- Greater sensitivity to maldistribution

== See also ==
- Packed bed
