= Dixon rings =

Dixon rings are a form of random packing used in chemical processing. They consist of a stainless steel mesh formed into a ring with a central divider, and are intended to be packed randomly into a packed column. Dixon rings provide a large surface area and low pressure drop while maintaining a high mass transfer rate, making them useful for distillations and many other applications.

== Background ==
=== Packed columns ===
Packed columns are used in a range of industries to allow intimate contact between two immiscible fluids which can be liquid/liquid or liquid/gas. The fluids are passed through in a countercurrent flow through a column.

=== Random column packing ===
Random column packing used to characterize the maximum volume fraction of a solid object obtained when they are packed randomly. This method of packing has been used since the early 1820s; the types of packing used were originally made out of glass spheres. However, in 1850 they were replaced by a more porous pumice stone and pieces of coke.

In the early 20th century Friedrich Raschig realized the importance of a high void fraction and having the internal surface of the packing media take part in the mass transfer. He designed the Raschig ring, which was more effective than previous forms of random packing and became very popular. Raschig rings are usually built from ceramic or metal and provided a large surface area within the column for interaction between liquid and gas vapors.

== The development of the Dixon ring ==
In 1943 Dr Olaf George Dixon of ICI applied for a patent of a new product for column distillation. He used stainless steel mesh instead of sheet steel in the Lessing ring in order to improve the pressure drop of the packed column (in fact, they were called "wire gauze Lessing rings" in a 1949 publication).

== Application ==
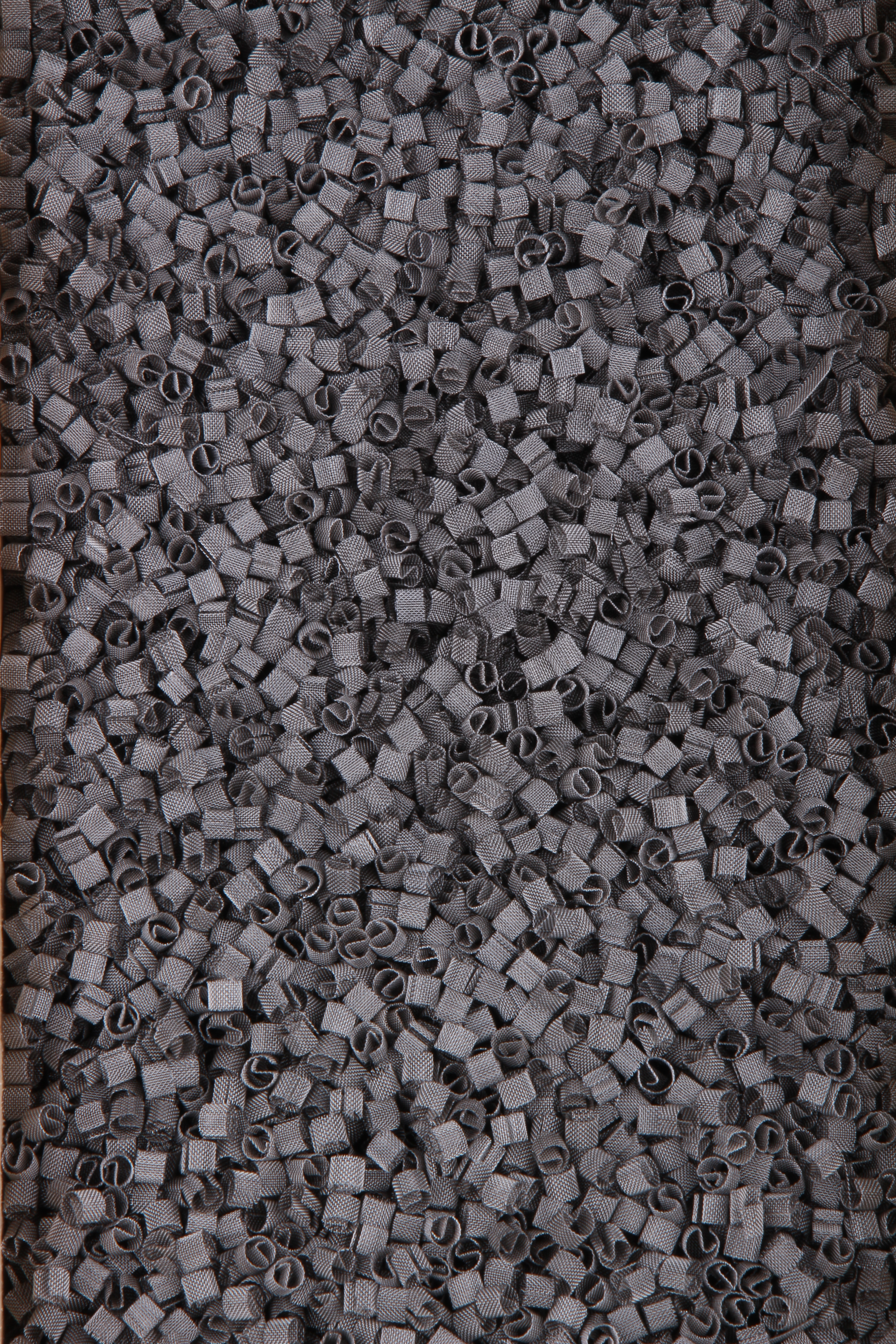
Dixon rings

Dixon rings are used for mainly for laboratory distillation applications.

== Performance principles ==
The enhanced performance of the Dixon ring is based on liquid surface tension: when the mesh is wet its surface area increases greatly, with an accompanying increase in the rate of mass transfer. Dixon rings require pre-wetting (flow of liquid over the packed bed prior to starting the reaction flow). While this increases batch processing startup time, the increased performance of the Dixon ring overcomes this.

Table showing the physical properties of Dixon rings
Property	Ring size		
Property	1/16"	1/8"	1/4"
Surface area $m^2/m^3$	3550	2378	900
Void space %	94.63	90.98	90.73
Number per litre	102,000	24,400	2,965

== See also ==
- Random column packing
- Fenske helices
