= Random column packing =

Random column packing is the practice of packing a distillation column with randomly fitting filtration material in order to optimize surface area over which reactants can interact while minimizing the complexity of construction of such columns. Random column packing is an alternative to structured column packing.

== Packed columns ==
Packed columns utilizing filter media for chemical exchange are the most common devices used in the chemical industry for reactant contact optimization. Packed columns are used in a range of industries to allow intimate contact between two immiscible/partly immiscible fluids, which can be liquid/gas or liquid/liquid. The fluids are passed through a column in a countercurrent flow. In the column it is important to maintain an effective mass transfer, so it is essential that a packing is selected which will support a large surface area for mass transfer.

== History ==
Random packing was used as early as 1820. Originally the packing material consisted of glass spheres; by 1850 they had been replaced by a more porous pumice stone and pieces of coke. The packing materials were further developed and specialized as the chemical process industry took shape throughout the 19th and 20th centuries.

== Applications ==
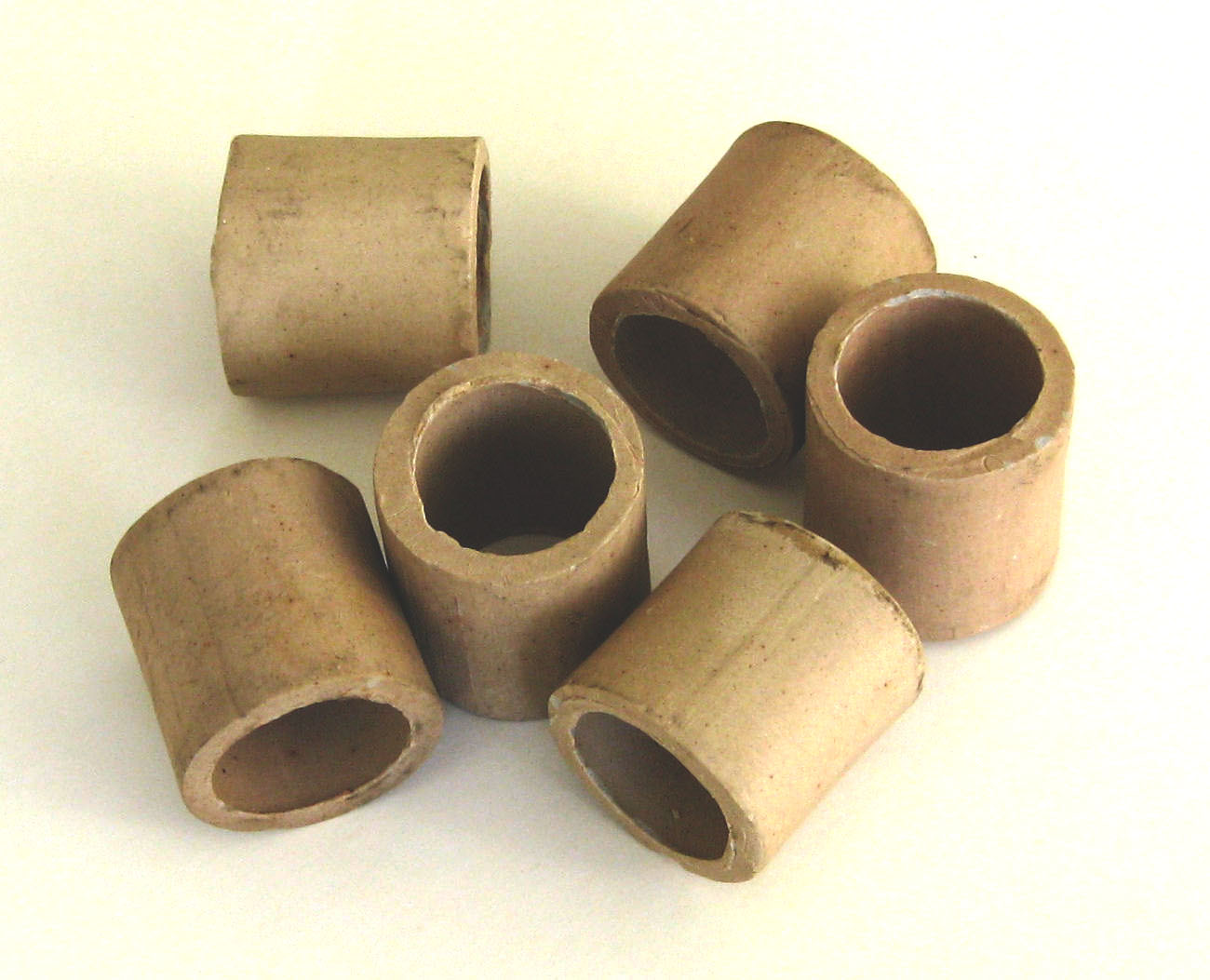
This shows a photo of Raschig rings

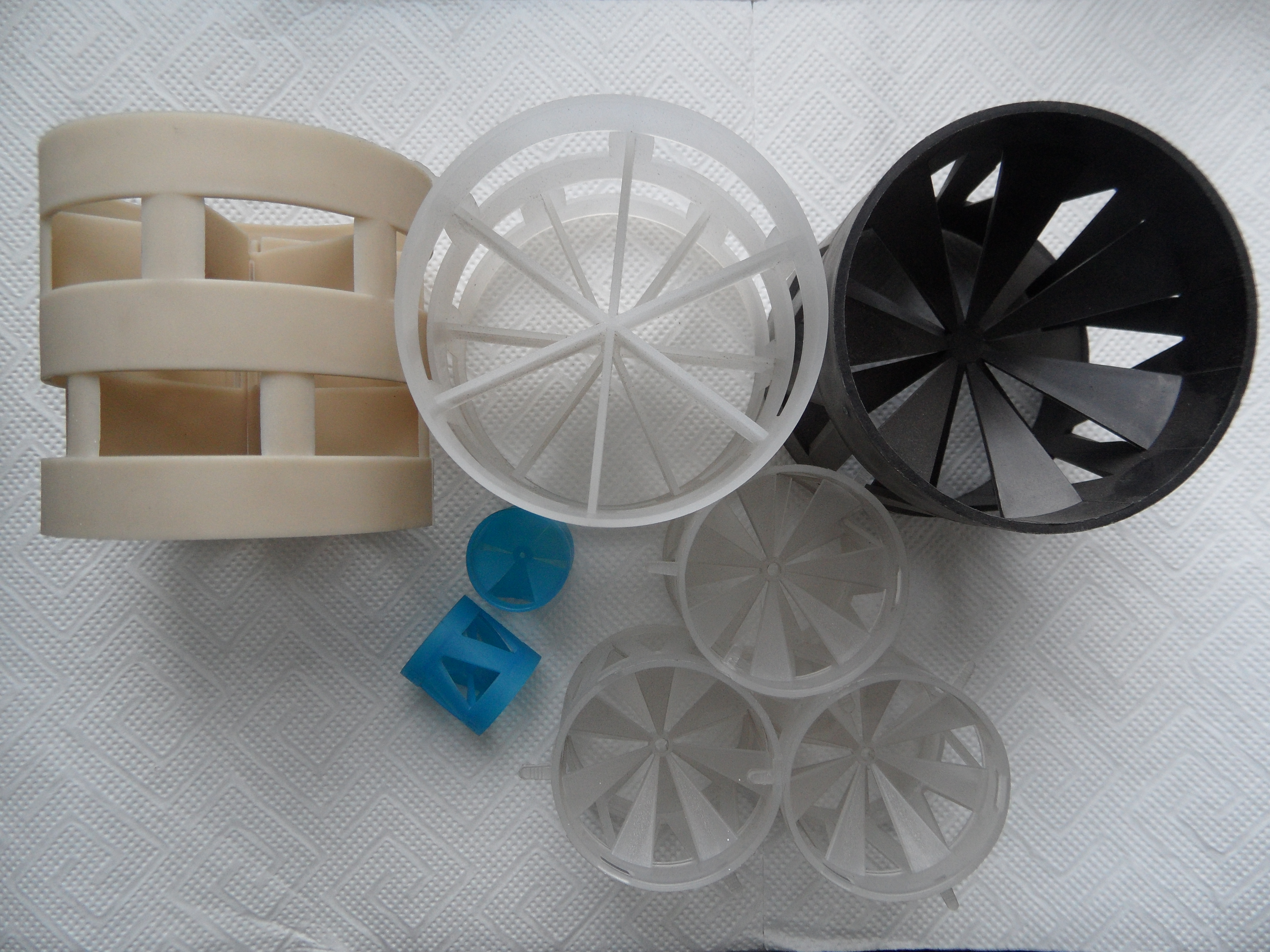
Pall rings (beige and large white) and Białecki rings (others)

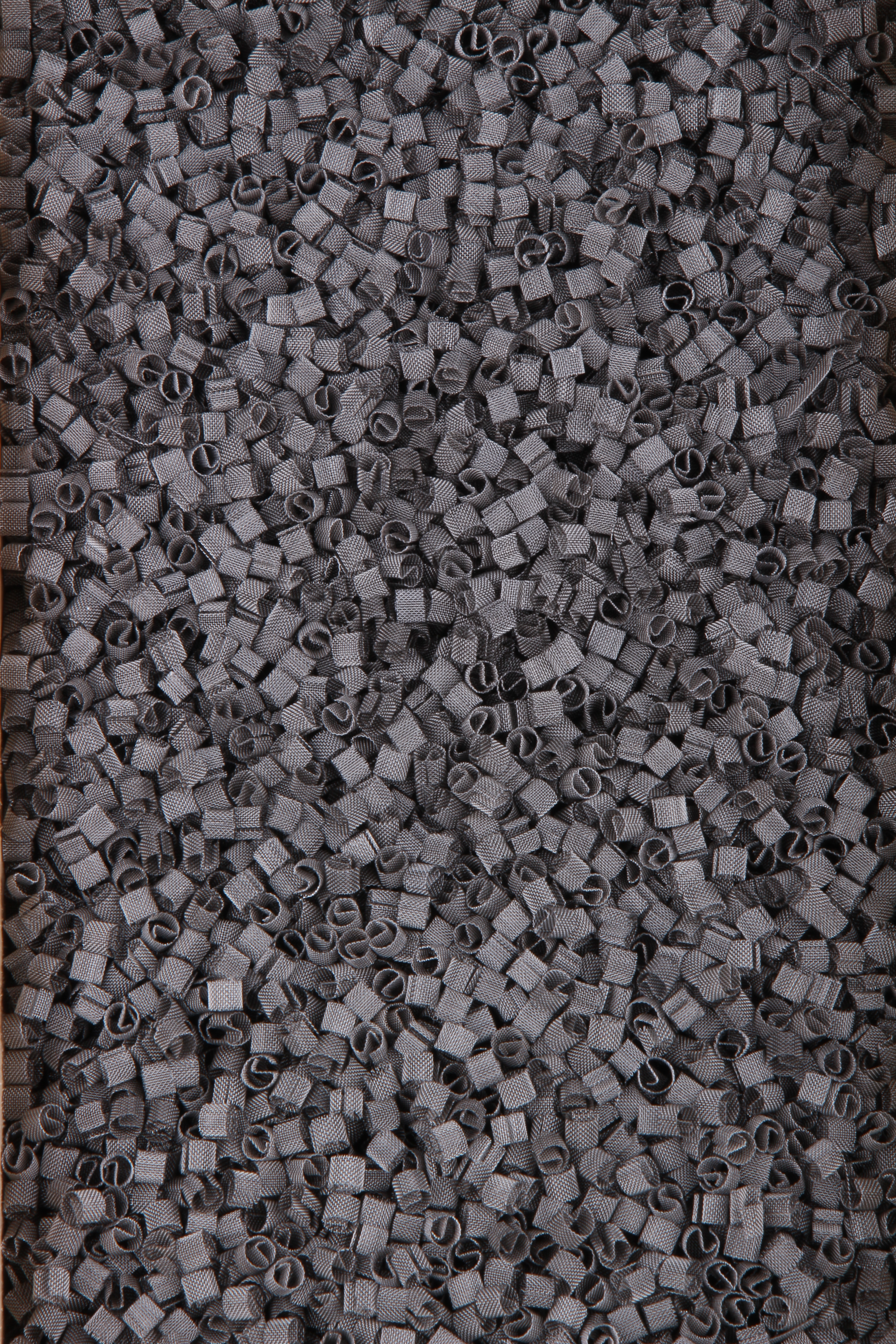
Dixon rings

Random packed columns are used in a variety of applications, including:

- Distillation
- Stripping
- Carbon dioxide scrubbing
- Liquid–liquid extraction

== Types ==
=== Raschig ring ===
The Raschig ring is a piece of tube, invented circa 1914, that is used in large numbers in a packing column. Raschig rings are usually made of ceramic or metals, and they provide a large surface area within the column, allowing for interaction between liquid and gas vapors.

=== Lessing ring ===
Lessing rings are a type of random packing similar to the Raschig ring invented in the early 20th century by German-born British chemist Rudolf Lessing (1878-1964) of Mond Nickel Company. Originally wrapped from steel strips according to his 1919 patent, now they are made of ceramic. Lessing rings have partitioned insides which increase the surface area and enhance mass transfer efficiency. Lessing rings have a high density and an excellent heat and acid resistance. Lessing rings withstand corrosion and are used in regenerative oxide systems and transfer systems.

=== Pall ring ===
Pall rings are the most common form of random packing. They are similar to Lessing rings and were developed from the Raschig ring. Pall rings have similar cylindrical dimensions but has rows of windows which increase performance by increasing the surface area. They are suited for low pressure drop and high capacity applications. They have a degree of randomness and a relatively high liquid hold up, promoting a high absorption, especially when the rate of reaction is slow. The cross structure of the Pall ring makes it mechanically robust and suitable for use in deep packed beds.

=== Białecki ring ===
The Bialecki ring was patented in 1974 by Polish chemical engineer from Kraków Zbigniew Białecki rings are an improved version of Raschig rings. The rings may be injection moulded of plastics or press-formed from metal sheet without welding. Specific surface area of filling ranges between 60 and 440 m^{2}/m^{3}.

=== Dixon ring ===
Dixon rings have a similar design to Lessing rings. They are made of stainless steel mesh, giving Dixon rings a low pressure drop and after pre-wetting. Dixon rings have a very large surface area, which increases the rate of mass transfer. Dixon rings have a large liquid hold up, a low pressure drop and a large surface area, and have a high mass transfer rate. Dixon rings are used for laboratory distillation and scrubbing applications.
