= Warren K. Lewis =

American chemical engineer (1882–1975)

- Lewis in 1936
- Born: Warren Kendall Lewis; August 21, 1882; Laurel, Delaware, U.S.
- Died: March 9, 1975 (aged 92); Plymouth, Massachusetts, U.S.
- Education: Massachusetts Institute of Technology (SB, 1905); University of Breslau (PhD, 1908)
- Known for: Unit operations; Theory of fractional distillation; Principles of Chemical Engineering (1923); Fluid catalytic cracking
- Spouse: Rosalind Kenway (m. 1909)
- Children: 4
- Awards: Perkin Medal (1936); Priestley Medal (1947); National Medal of Science (1965)
- Scientific career
- Fields: Chemical engineering
- Workplaces: Massachusetts Institute of Technology
- Thesis: Die Komplexbildung zwischen Bleinitrat und Kaliumnitrat (1908)
- Doctoral advisor: Richard Abegg

Warren Kendall Lewis (21 August 1882 – 9 March 1975) was a professor at the Massachusetts Institute of Technology (MIT) who has been called the father of modern chemical engineering. He co-authored an early major textbook on the subject which essentially introduced the concept of unit operations. He also co-developed the Houdry process under contract to the Standard Oil Company of New Jersey into modern fluid catalytic cracking with Edwin R. Gilliland, another MIT professor.

== Life ==
Lewis was born in Laurel, Delaware, on 21 August 1882. In 1901, he enrolled at MIT to study engineering, selecting the chemical engineering option from the department of chemistry. Graduating in 1905, he went on to postgraduate study of physical chemistry in Breslau, Germany. He completed a doctorate in 1908 under Richard Abegg with a dissertation on complex formation between lead nitrate and potassium nitrate. Shortly after, he returned to MIT to join the teaching staff. In 1909 he married Rosalind Kenway; they had four children.

In 1909 Lewis published a paper on "The Theory of Fractional Distillation" which was the basis for subsequent chemical engineering calculation methods. (He later authored 19 patents on distillation.) In 1920 he became the first head of the newly formed Department of Chemical Engineering at MIT a position he held until 1929 before returning to teaching and research.

In November 1942 Lewis was appointed to chair a committee to survey the Manhattan Project and review all aspects of the bomb research and development, partly because of du Pont's doubts about the plutonium process. Their report dated December 4 supported the plutonium project. It also recommended concentrating on the gaseous diffusion process for enriching uranium and building only a small electromagnetic plant. Conant supported building a large electromagnetic plant, which Nichols says was essential to dropping the bomb in August rather than months later. The committee also suggested suitable industrial organisations and ... furnished us with a blueprint for the complete industrial organization of the project which Groves mostly followed ... and gave us more confidence concerning the feasibility of producing sufficient quantities of fissionable material. In April–May 1944 another committee under Lewis recommended construction of the S-50 thermal diffusion plant developed by Philip Abelson of the US Navy.

He was made professor emeritus in 1948 and continued to work within the department until his death in Plymouth, Massachusetts, on 9 March 1975.

== Honors ==
- 1936 Perkin Medal of the Society of Chemical Industry
- 1947 Lamme Medal of the American Society of Engineering Education
- 1947 Priestley Medal of the American Chemical Society. He was the first chemical engineer to achieve the Priestley Medal.
- 1949 American Institute of Chemists Gold Medal
- 1957 E. V. Murphree Award
- 1965 National Medal of Science
- 1966 Elected to the US National Academy of Engineering
- 1973 Simon Ramo Founders Award of the National Academy of Engineering
- He is commemorated in the Warren K. Lewis Award for Chemical Engineering Education of the AIChE and in the Warren K. Lewis Lectureship at MIT.
