= Plate column =

A plate column (or tray column) is equipment used in chemistry to carry out unit operations where it is necessary to transfer mass between a liquid phase and a gas phase. In other words, it is a particular gas-liquid contactor. The peculiarity of this gas-liquid contactor is that the gas comes in contact with liquid through different stages; each stage is delimited by two plates (except the stages at the top and bottom of the column).

Some common applications of plate columns are distillation, gas-liquid absorption and liquid-liquid extraction. In general, plate columns are suitable for both continuous and batch operations.

== Fluid dynamics ==
Schematics of a plate column with bubble cap trays.

The feed to the column can be liquid, gas or gas and liquid at equilibrium. Inside the column there are always two phases: one gas phase and one liquid phase. The liquid phase flows downward through the column via gravity, while the gas phase flows upward. These two phases come in contact in correspondence of holes, valves or bubble caps that fill the area of the plates. Gas moves to the higher plate through these devices, while the liquid moves to the lower plate through a downcomer.

The liquid is collected to the bottom of the column and it undergoes evaporation through a reboiler, while the gas is collected to the top and it undergoes condensation through a condenser. The liquid and gas produced at the top and at the bottom are in general recirculated.

In the simplest case, there are just one feed stream and two product streams. In the case of the fractionating column, there are instead many product streams.

== Bibliography ==
- Robert Perry, Don W. Green, Perry's Chemical Engineers' Handbook, 8th ed., McGraw-Hill, 2007. ISBN 0071422943
- Theodore, Louis; Ricci, Francesco (2011). Mass Transfer Operations for the Practicing Engineer. John Wiley and Sons. ISBN 0470602589.
- Ghosal, Salil K.; Datta, Siddhartha (2011). Introduction to Chemical Engineering. Tata McGraw-Hill Education. ISBN 0074601407.

== See also ==
- Distillation
- Packed bed
- Fractionating column
