= Raschig ring =

Type of random column packing used in chemical industry

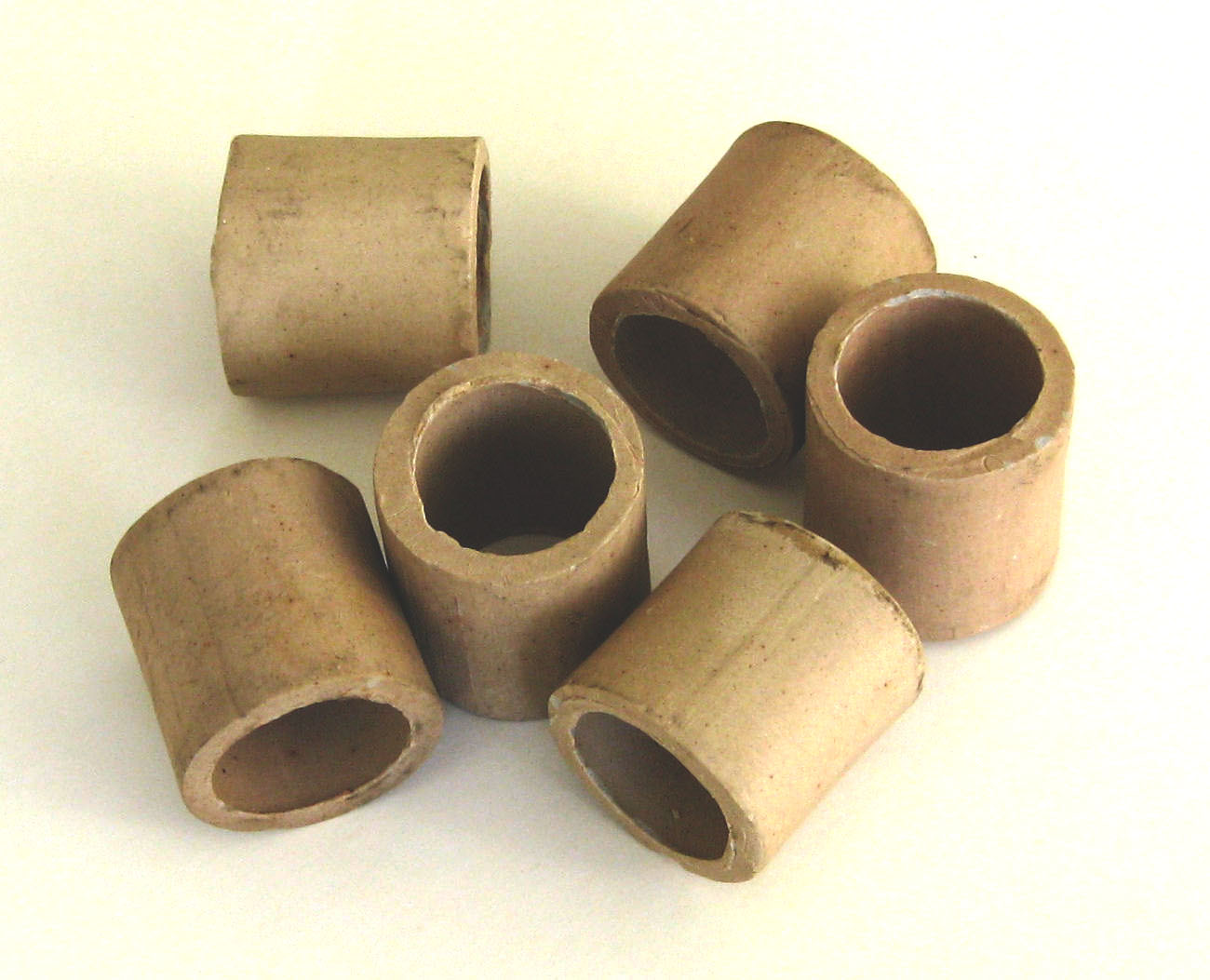
Raschig rings one inch (25 mm) ceramic

A Raschig ring is a piece of tube, approximately equal in length and diameter, used in large numbers as a packed bed within columns for distillations and other chemical engineering processes. They are usually ceramic, metal, or glass and provide a large surface area within the volume of the column for interaction between liquid and gas vapours.

Raschig rings are named after their inventor, German chemist Friedrich Raschig, who patented them in 1914.

== Use ==
They form what is known as random packing, and enabled Raschig to perform distillations of much greater efficiency than his competitors using fractional distillation columns with trays.

In a distillation column, the reflux or condensed vapour runs down the column, covering the surfaces of the rings, while vapour from the reboiler goes up the column. As the vapour and liquid pass each other countercurrently in a small space, they tend toward equilibrium. Thus, less-volatile material tends to go downward, and more-volatile material upward.

They are also used for devices where gas and liquid are put in contact for purposes of gas absorption, stripping, or chemical reaction, and as a support for biofilms in biological reactors.

Raschig rings made from borosilicate glass are sometimes employed in the handling of nuclear materials. They are used inside vessels and tanks containing solutions of fissile material, for example solutions of enriched uranyl nitrate. There they act as neutron absorbers to prevent a criticality accident.

== Developments ==
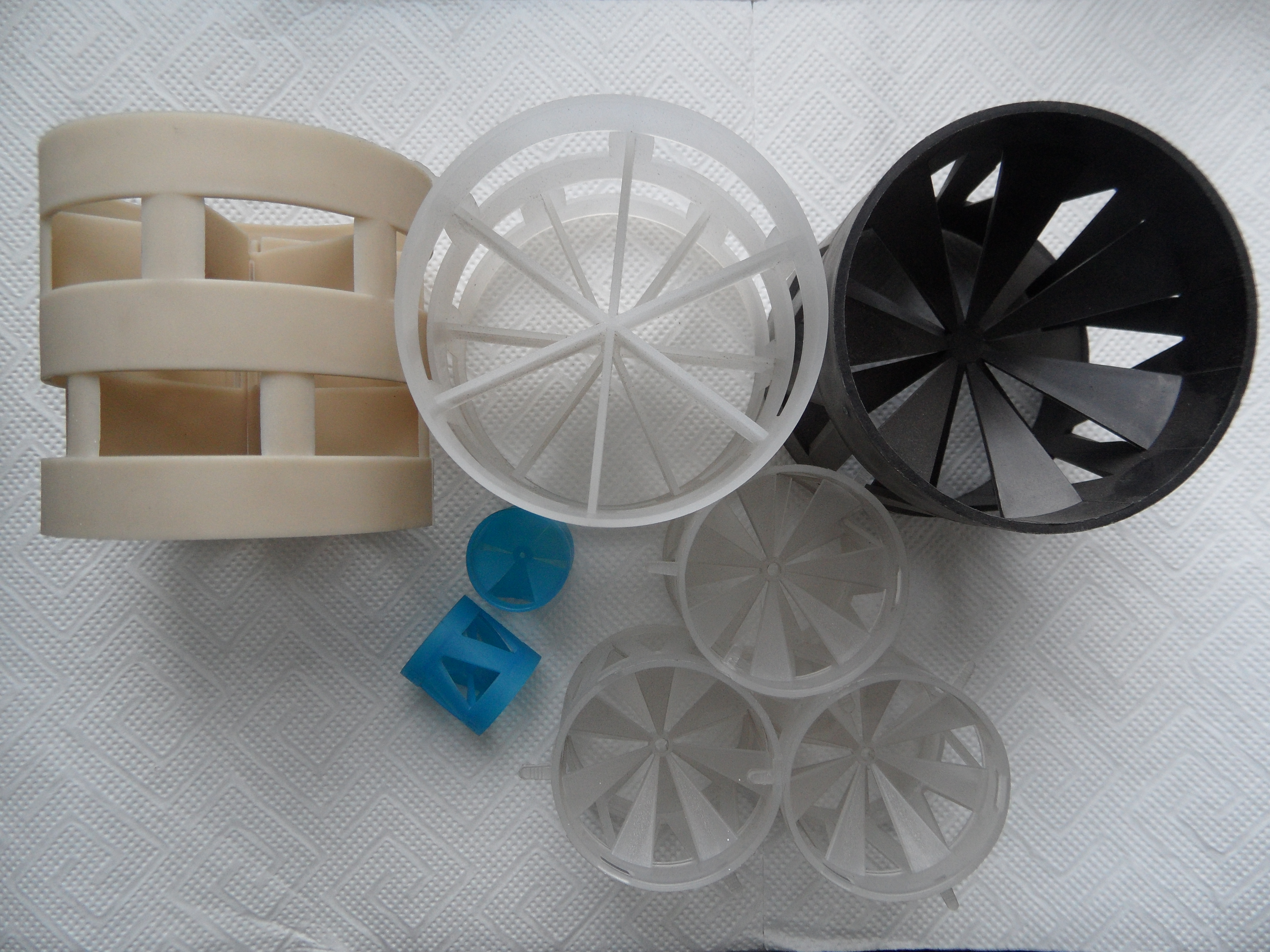
Pall rings (beige and large white) and Białecki rings (others)

Given the success of the Raschig ring, there have been other forms developed to either improve upon it, or to avoid patents for particular designs.

The Pall-Ring, commonly spelled as Pall ring, developed by Wilhelm Pfannmüller of BASF during the WWII, attempts to increase the useful aspects of packing, by giving an increased number of edges to disrupt flow, while also reducing the volume taken up by the ring packing medium itself. Rather than using a solid-walled tube, the Pall ring resembles an open basket structure of thin bars. These form both a tube and also a radial structure of cross bars. Pall rings may be injection moulded of plastics, moulded of ceramics or press-formed from metal sheet.

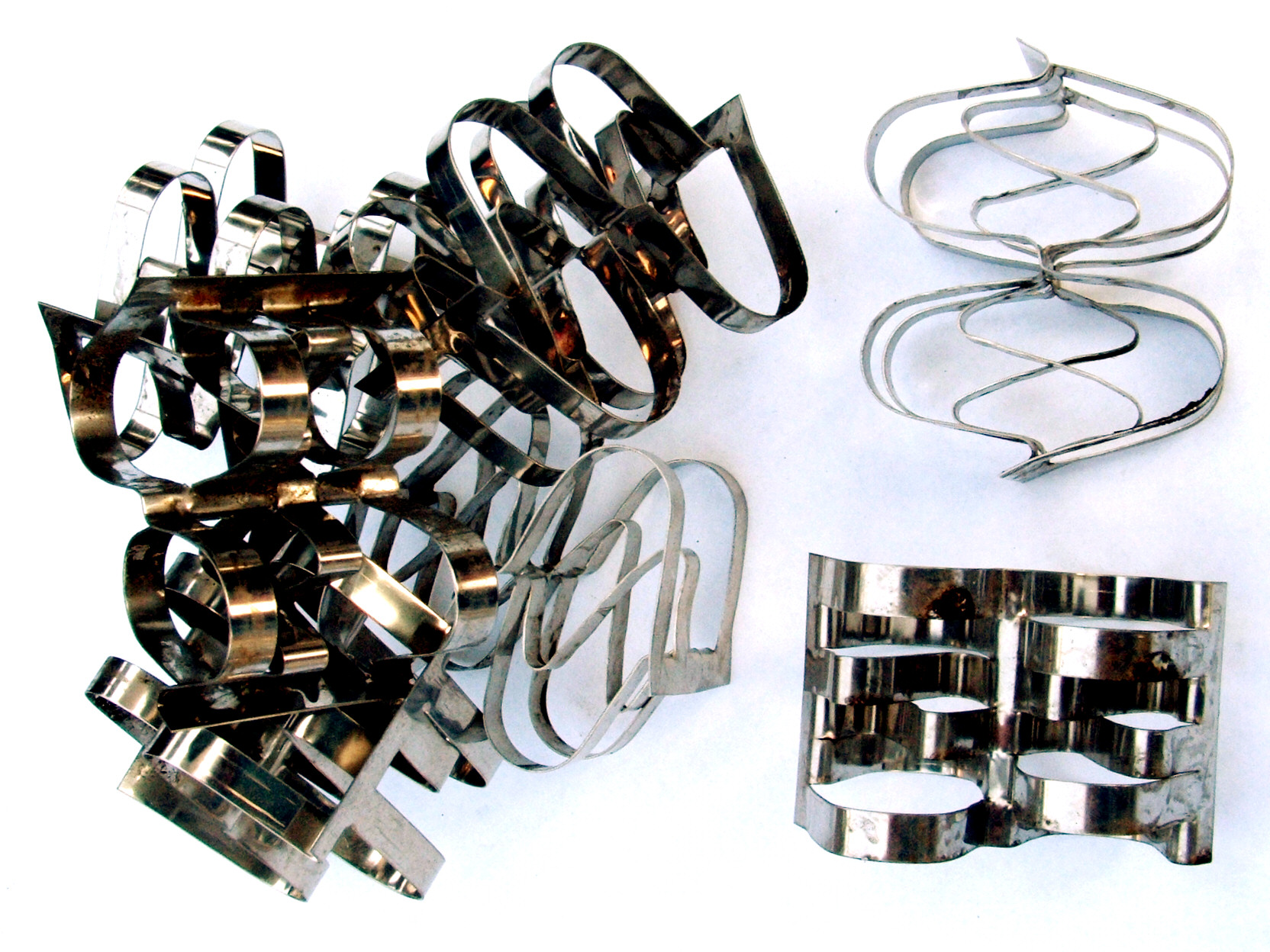
Raschig super-rings

The Raschig Super Ring represents a further development of the same concepts behind the Pall ring. It optimises the production of turbulent film-type flows and prevents the formation of drops. The 'rings' no longer resemble rings but are pressed from metal sheet in the form of wave shapes of narrow strips. Super rings appeared in 1995 and have been developed through several improved generations since.

The Bialecki ring, developed by the same Pfanmüller as the Pall-Ring and first patented by him in 1944, is mistakenly named after the Polish chemical engineer from Kraków Zbigniew Białecki. Like the Pall rings, they are an improved version of Raschig rings. The rings may be injection moulded of plastics or press-formed from metal sheet without welding. Specific surface area of filling ranges between 60 and 440 m^{2}/m^{3}. Advantages of Białecki rings include:

- Two or three times lower fluid flow resistance than Raschig rings,
- Two or three times higher bandwidth,
- Disperse the liquid evenly over the entire cross-section of the column, regardless of the method of supply, even with point-type liquid supply,
- Liquid retention ("hold-up") in relation to other fillings is negligible - the liquid flows down quickly after the column stops working,
- Resolving power at a constant level regardless of column load,
- The mass transfer coefficient increases with the size of the ring dimensions, unlike the other fillings used so far,
- Minimal overgrow (do not cover with sediment),
- A rigid construction, which allows weight reduction of up to 20% compared to other filling rings.

== See also ==
- Fractionating column – Equipment to separate liquids by distillation
- Dixon rings
- Random column packing
- Stripping (chemistry) – Physical separation process
