= Packed bed =

Hollow object filled with material that does not fully obstruct fluid flow

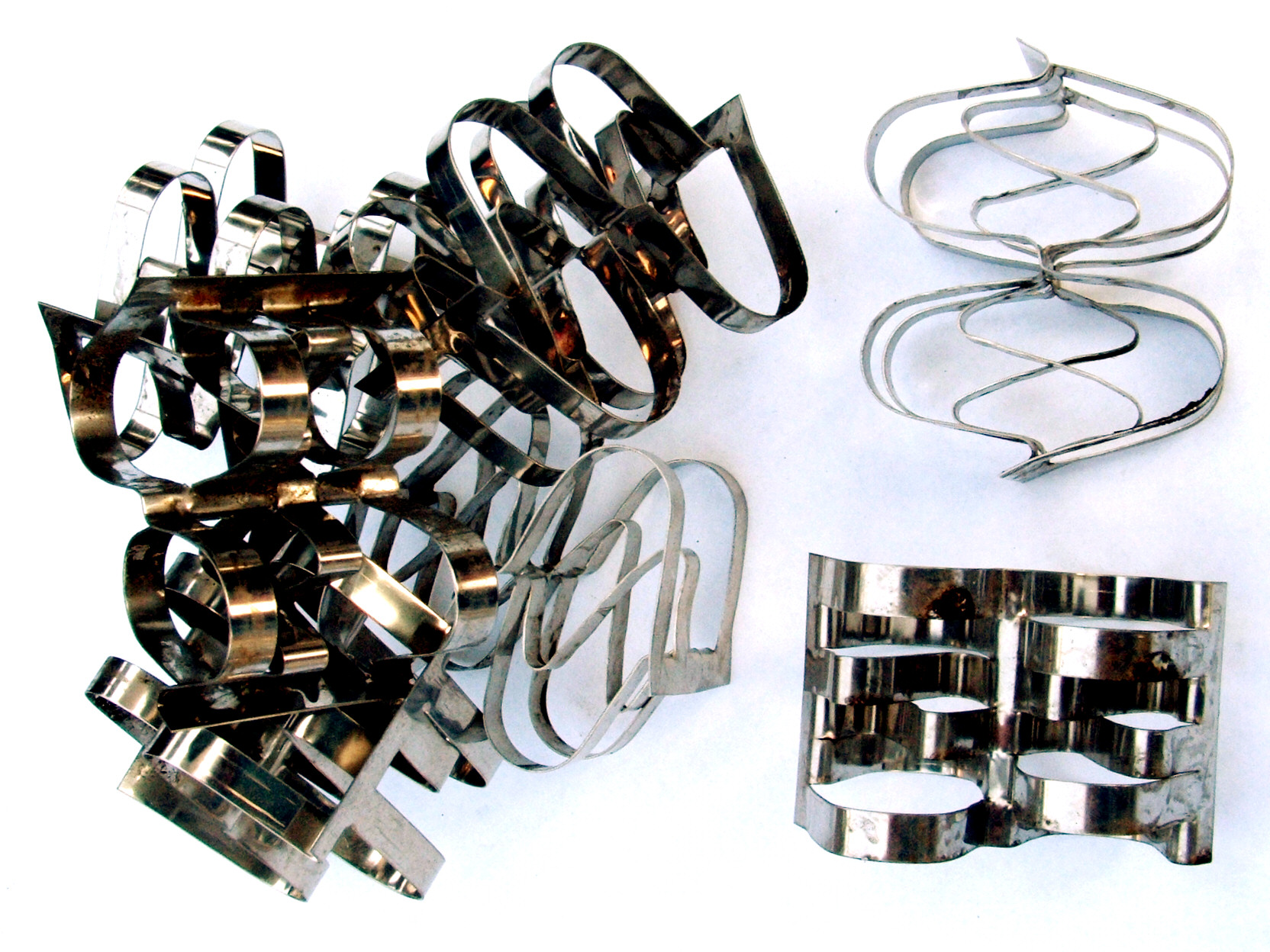
Super-Raschig rings

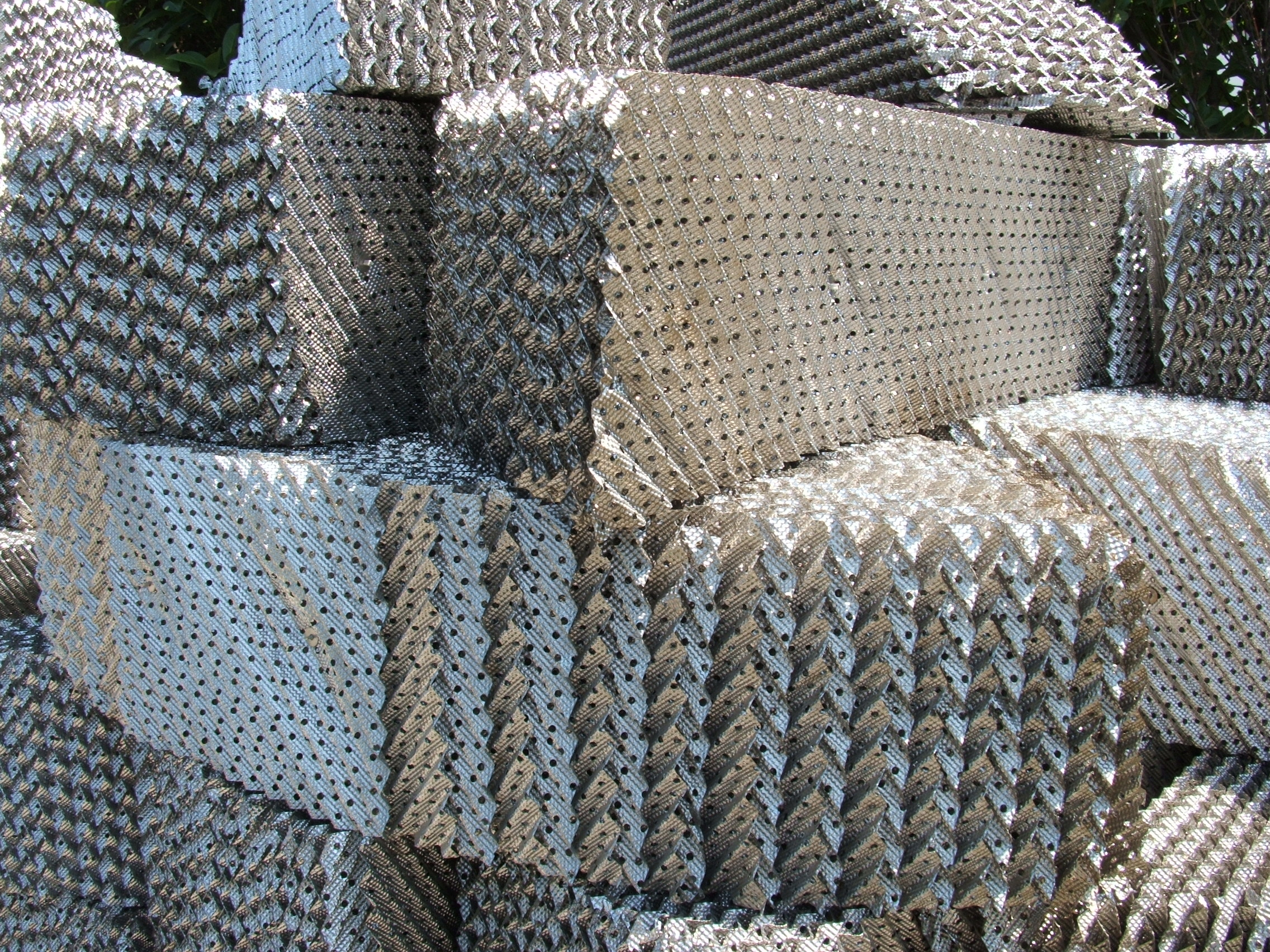
Structured packing

In chemical processing, a packed bed is a hollow tube, pipe, or other vessel that is filled with a packing material. The packed bed can be randomly filled with small objects like Raschig rings or else it can be a specifically designed structured packing. Packed beds may also contain catalyst particles or adsorbents such as zeolite pellets, granular activated carbon, etc.

The purpose of a packed bed is typically to improve contact between two phases in a chemical or similar process. Packed beds can be used in a chemical reactor, a distillation process, or a scrubber, but packed beds have also been used to store heat in chemical plants. In this case, hot gases are allowed to escape through a vessel that is packed with a refractory material until the packing is hot. Air or other cool gas is then fed back to the plant through the hot bed, thereby pre-heating the air or gas feed.

== Applications ==
A packed bed used to perform separation processes, such as absorption, stripping, and distillation is known as a packed column. Columns used in certain types of chromatography consisting of a tube filled with packing material can also be called packed columns and their structure has similarities to packed beds.

The column bed can be filled with randomly dumped packing material (creating a random packed bed) or with structured packing sections, which are arranged in a way that force fluids to take complicated paths through the bed (creating a structured packed bed). In the column, liquids tend to wet the surface of the packing material and the vapors pass across this wetted surface, where mass transfer takes place. Packing materials can be used instead of trays to improve separation in distillation columns. Packing offers the advantage of a lower pressure drop across the column (when compared to plates or trays), which is beneficial while operating under vacuum. Differently shaped packing materials have different surface areas and void space between the packing. Both of these factors affect packing performance.

Another factor in performance, in addition to the packing shape and surface area, is the liquid and vapor distribution that enters the packed bed. The number of theoretical stages required to make a given separation is calculated using a specific vapor to liquid ratio. If the liquid and vapor are not evenly distributed across the superficial tower area as it enters the packed bed, the liquid to vapor ratio will not be correct and the required separation will not be achieved. The packing will appear to not be working properly. The height equivalent to a theoretical plate (HETP) will be greater than expected. The problem is not the packing itself but the mal-distribution of the fluids entering the packed bed. These columns can contain liquid distributors and redistributors which help to distribute the liquid evenly over a section of packing, increasing the efficiency of the mass transfer. The design of the liquid distributors used to introduce the feed and reflux to a packed bed is critical to making the packing perform at maximum efficiency.

Packed columns have a continuous vapor-equilibrium curve, unlike conventional tray distillation in which every tray represents a separate point of vapor-liquid equilibrium. However, when modeling packed columns, it is useful to compute a number of theoretical plates to denote the separation efficiency of the packed column with respect to more traditional trays. In design, the number of necessary theoretical equilibrium stages is first determined and then the packing height equivalent to a theoretical equilibrium stage, known as the height equivalent to a theoretical plate (HETP), is also determined. The total packing height required is the number theoretical stages multiplied by the HETP.

== Packed Bed Reactors (PBRs) ==
Packed bed reactors are reactor vessels containing a fixed bed of catalytic material; they are widely used in the chemical process industry and find primary use in heterogeneous, gas-phase, catalytic reactions. The advantages of using a packed bed reactor include the high conversion of reactants per unit mass of catalyst, relatively low operating costs, and continuous operation. Disadvantages include the presence of thermal gradients throughout the bed, poor temperature control, and difficult servicing of the reactor.

== Theory ==
The Ergun equation can be used to predict the pressure drop along the length of a packed bed given the fluid velocity, the packing size, and the viscosity and density of the fluid.

The Ergun equation, while reliable for systems on the surface of the earth, is unreliable for predicting the behavior of systems in microgravity. Experiments are currently underway aboard the International Space Station to collect data and develop reliable models for in-orbit packed-bed reactors.

== Monitoring ==
The performance of a packed bed is highly dependent on the flow of material through it, which in turn is dependent on the packing and how the flow is managed. Tomographic techniques such as near-infrared, x-ray, gamma ray, electrical capacitance, electrical resistance tomography are used to quantify liquid distribution patterns in packed columns; choice of tomographic technique depends on the primary measurement of interest, randomness of packing, safety requirements, desired data acquisition rate, and budget.

== See also ==
- Continuous distillation – Form of distillation
- Kozeny-Carman equation – Relation used in the field of fluid dynamics
- Fluidized bed – Physical phenomenon
- Industrial Tomography Systems
- Dixon rings
- Random column packing

== Bibliography ==
- Perry, Robert H. & Green, Don W. (1984). Perry's Chemical Engineers' Handbook (6th ed.). McGraw-Hill. ISBN 0-07-049479-7.
