= Evaporator (disambiguation) =

An evaporator is a device which turns the liquid form of a substance into its gaseous or vapour form. This is a widely used process and there are many applications for it.

Fundamental chemical production processes:

- Vacuum evaporation
- Flash evaporation
- Multi-effect distillation

Mechanisms for performing evaporation:

- Rotary evaporator, a vacuum evaporator, typically used in chemistry laboratories
- Centrifugal evaporator
- Circulation evaporator
- Rising film evaporator
- Falling film evaporator
- Climbing and falling film plate evaporator
- Multiple-effect evaporator
- Vapor-compression evaporation

Air conditioning:

- Evaporative cooler, simple unpowered cooling
- Evaporative cooling chambers, an application thereof
- Spray pond, large scale external cooling

Refrigeration:

- Vapor-compression refrigeration, the common motor-driven form of refrigerator, where the evaporator forms the 'cold plate' within the refrigerator
- Absorption refrigerator, a refrigerator powered by a heat source, also with an evaporator as the cold plate

Production of potable drinking water and boiler feedwater at sea or on arid coasts:

- Evaporator (marine)
- Chaplin's patent distilling apparatus
- Vapor-compression desalination
- Multi-stage flash distillation
