= Rhamnosidase =

Rhamnosidase may refer to:

- α-L-Rhamnosidase
- β-L-Rhamnosidase
- Naringinase
