= Distillation (disambiguation) =

Distillation is a method of separating mixtures based on differences in their volatilities in a boiling liquid mixture.

Within the field of chemistry and chemical engineering, many specific sorts of distillation are in widespread use. The term is also used to refer to other purification or separation processes in other fields

== Chemistry ==
- Azeotropic distillation
- Batch distillation
- Continuous distillation
- Destructive distillation
- Dry distillation
- Extractive distillation
- Fractional distillation
- Multi-stage flash distillation
- Reactive distillation
- Salt-effect distillation
- Spinning band distillation
- Steam distillation
- Vacuum distillation

== Computer science ==
- Distillation (machine learning)

== Environmental science ==
- Global distillation, the process by which chemicals such as pollutants are transported from warmer to colder regions of the Earth.

== Music ==
- Distillation (Erin McKeown album), 2000
- Distillation (Wishbone Ash album), 1997

== Publications ==
- Distillation Design
- Distillations (magazine), a magazine published by the Science History Institute

== Quantum Physics ==
- Entanglement distillation

== See also ==
- Distiller (disambiguation)
- Distillery (disambiguation)
