= Juice =

Naturally occurring liquid present in fruits and vegetables

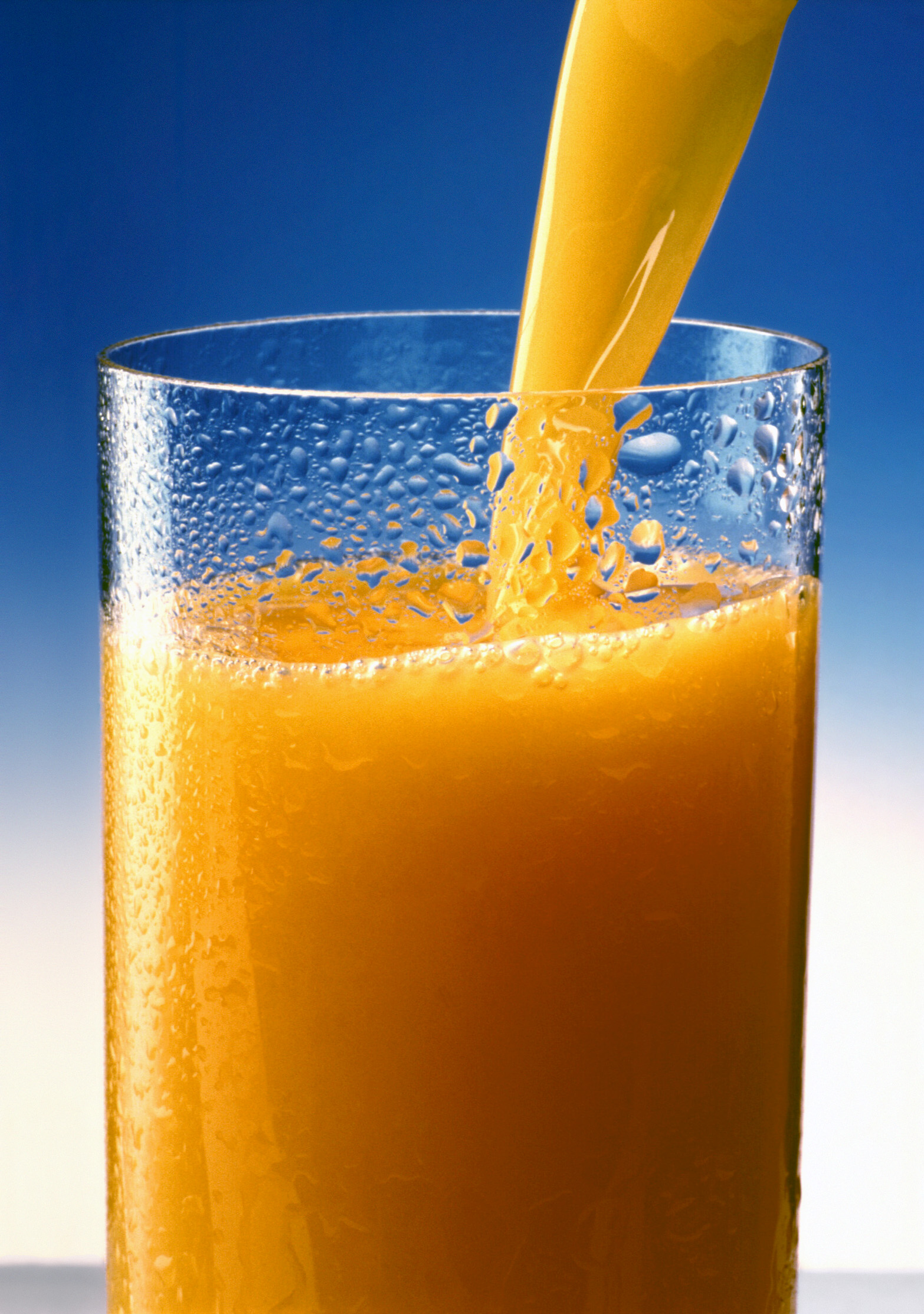
A glass of orange juice

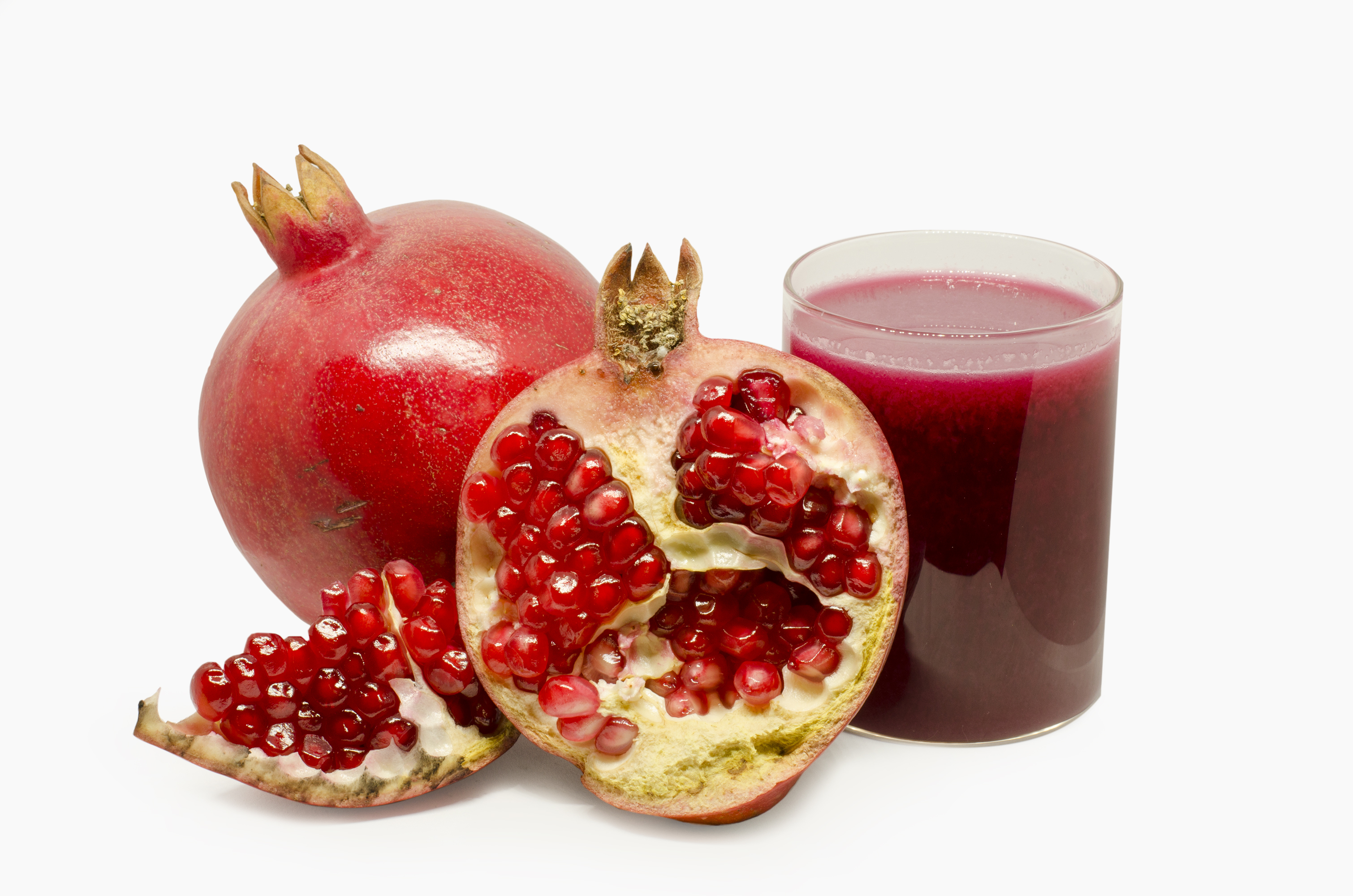
Pomegranate juice

Juice is a drink made from the extraction or pressing of the natural liquid contained in fruit and vegetables. It can also refer to liquids that are flavored with concentrate or other biological food sources like meat or seafood, such as clam juice. Juice is commonly consumed as a beverage or used as an ingredient or flavoring in foods or other beverages, such as smoothies. Juice emerged as a popular beverage choice after the development of pasteurization methods enabled its preservation without using fermentation (which is used in wine production). The largest fruit juice consumers are New Zealand (nearly a cup, or 8 ounces, each day) and Colombia (more than three quarters of a cup each day). Fruit juice consumption on average increases with a country's income level.

== Etymology ==
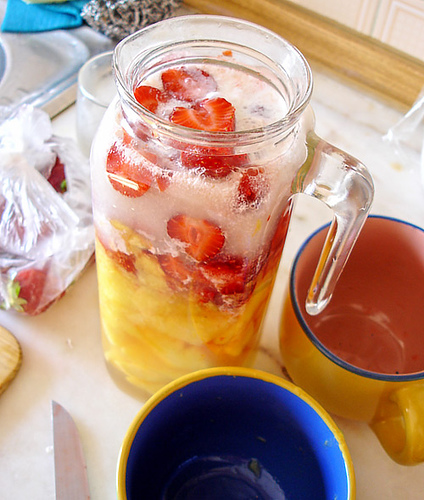
Fruit juice being used in the preparation of a smoothie

The word "juice" developed around the year 1300 from the Old French words jus, juis, jouis ("liquid obtained by boiling herbs"). The Old French jus ("juice, sap, liquid") (13c.) came from Latin ius ("broth, sauce, juice, soup"), from the Proto-Indo-European root *yeue- ("to blend, mix food") (cognates: Sanskrit yus "broth", Greek zyme "a leaven", Old Church Slavonic jucha "broth, soup", Russian: уха ukha, Lithuanian: juse "fish soup").

The use of the word "juice" to mean "the watery part of fruits or vegetables" was first recorded in the early 14th century. Since the 19th century, the term "juice" has also been used in a figurative sense (e.g., to mean alcohol or electricity). Today, "au jus" refers to meat served along with its own juice, commonly as a gravy.

== History ==
Groups of grape pits dated to 8000 BCE show early evidence of juice production, although it is thought that the grapes may have been alternatively used to produce wine. One of the first regularly produced juices was lemonade, which appeared in 16th-century Italy as an import after its conception in the Middle East. Orange juice originated in the 17th century. In the 18th century, James Lind linked citrus fruits to the prevention of scurvy, which, a century later, led to the implementation of the Merchant Shipping Act 1867, requiring all ocean-bound British ships to carry citrus-based juice on board.

In 1869, a dentist by the name of Thomas B. Welch developed a pasteurization method that allowed for the storage of juice without the juice fermenting into alcohol. His method involved filtering squeezed grape juice into bottles, sealing them with cork and wax, and then placing them in boiling water. This method kills the yeast responsible for fermentation. He then sold his new product as "Dr. Welch's Unfermented Wine". In the late 18th-century United States, the circulation of foreign fruit juices was heavily regulated by tariffs. The McKinley Tariff Act of 1890 increased import taxes from 38 to 49.5 percent and set taxes on fruit juices based on the alcohol content of the drink. Juices with 18% or less alcohol were taxed at 60 cents per gallon, while anything above 18% was taxed at US$2.50 per proof gallon.

== Terminology ==
In the United Kingdom, the name or names of the fruit followed by juice can only legally be used to describe a product that is 100% fruit juice, as required by the Fruit Juices and Fruit Nectars (England) Regulations and the Fruit Juices and Fruit Nectars (Scotland) Regulations 2003. However, a juice made by reconstituting concentrate can be called juice. A product described as fruit "nectar" must contain at least 25% to 50% juice, depending on the fruit. A juice or nectar including concentrate must state that it does. The term "juice drink" is not defined in the Regulations and can be used to describe any drink that includes juice, whatever the amount. Comparable rules apply in all EU member states in their respective languages.

In the US, fruit juice can only legally be used to describe a product that is 100% fruit juice. A blend of fruit juice(s) with other ingredients, such as high-fructose corn syrup, is called a juice cocktail or juice drink. According to the Food and Drug Administration (FDA), the term "nectar" is generally accepted in the US and in international trade for a diluted juice to denote a beverage that contains fruit juice or puree, water, and artificial sweeteners. "No added sugar" is commonly printed on the labels of juice containers, but the products may contain large amounts of naturally occurring sugars; however, sugar content is listed with other carbohydrates on labels in many countries.

== Consumption ==
The largest fruit juice consumers are New Zealand (nearly a cup, or 8 ounces, each day) and Colombia (more than three quarters of a cup each day). Fruit juice consumption, on average, increased with country income level.

In 2007, a report stated that fruit juice consumption overall in Europe, Australia, New Zealand, and the US had increased in recent years.

In 2015, people in the United States consumed approximately 6.6 US gallons of juice per capita, with more than half of preschool-age children being regular drinkers.

== Production ==
=== Preparation ===
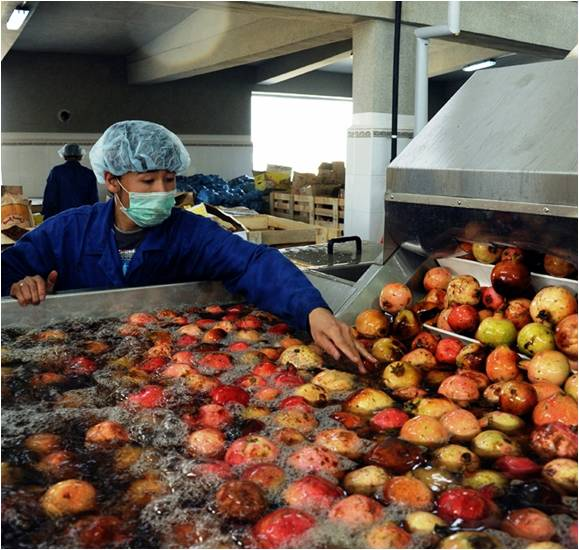
Pomegranates getting washed prior to processing in an Afghan fruit-concentrate factory

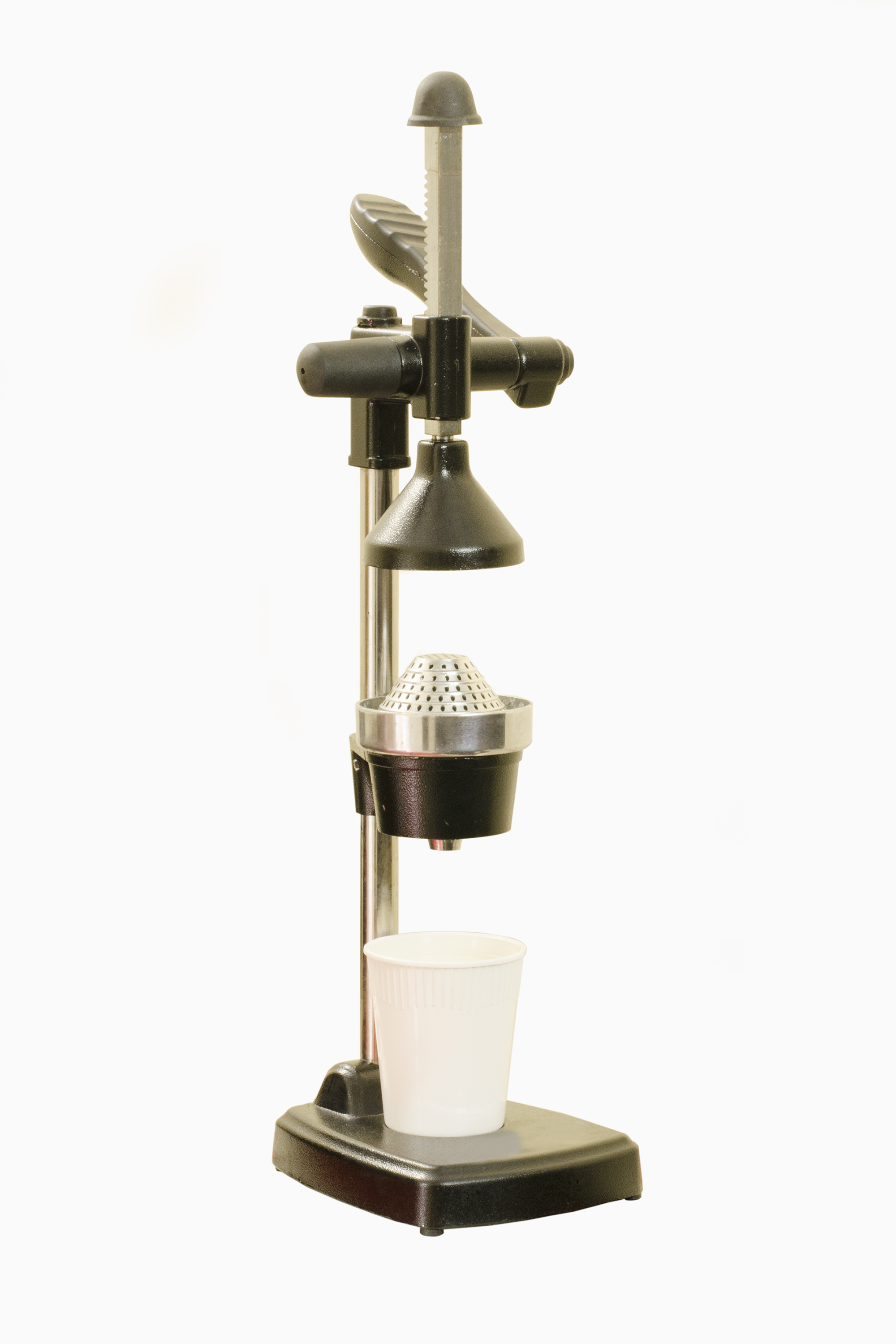
A hand press juicer machine

Juice is prepared by mechanically squeezing or macerating (sometimes referred to as cold pressing) fruit or vegetable flesh without the application of heat or solvents. For example, orange juice is the liquid extract of the fruit of the orange tree, and tomato juice is the liquid that results from pressing the fruit of the tomato plant. Juice may be prepared at home from fresh fruit and vegetables using a variety of hand or electric juicers. Many commercial juices are filtered to remove fiber or pulp, but high-pulp fresh orange juice is a popular beverage. Additives are put in some juices, such as sugar and artificial flavours (in some fruit juice-based beverages) or savoury seasonings (e.g., in Clamato or Caesar tomato juice drinks). Common methods for the preservation and processing of fruit juices include canning, pasteurization, concentrating, freezing, evaporation, and spray drying.

Although processing methods vary between juices, the general processing method of juices includes:

- Washing and sorting food source
- Juice extraction
- Straining, filtration and clarification
- Blending pasteurization
- Filling, sealing and sterilization
- Cooling, labeling and packing

After the fruits are picked and washed, the juice is extracted by one of two automated methods. In the first method, two metal cups with sharp metal tubes on the bottom cup come together, removing the peel and forcing the flesh of the fruit through the metal tube. The juice of the fruit then escapes through small holes in the tube. The peels can then be used further, and are washed to remove oils, which are reclaimed later for usage. The second method requires the fruits to be cut in half before being subjected to reamers, which extract the juice.

After the juice is filtered, it may be concentrated in evaporators, which reduce the size of the juice by a factor of 5, making it easier to transport and increasing its expiration date. Juices are concentrated by heating under a vacuum to remove water, and then cooling to around 13 degrees Celsius. About two-thirds of the water in a juice is removed. The juice is later reconstituted, a process in which the concentrate is mixed with water and other factors to restore any lost flavor from the concentrating process. Juices can also be sold in a concentrated state, in which the consumer adds water to the concentrated juice as preparation.

Juices are then pasteurized and filled into containers, often while still hot. If the juice is poured into a container while hot, it is cooled as quickly as possible. Packages that cannot stand heat require sterile conditions for filling. Chemicals such as hydrogen peroxide can be used to sterilize containers. Plants can make anywhere from 1 to 20 tonnes a day.

=== Pulsed electric fields processing ===
High-intensity pulsed electric fields are being used as an alternative to heat pasteurization in fruit juices. Heat treatments sometimes fail to make a quality, microbiologically stable product. However, it was found that processing with high-intensity pulsed electric fields (PEF) can be applied to fruit juices to provide a shelf-stable and safe product. In addition, it was found that pulsed electric fields provide a fresh-like product with high nutritional value. Pulsed electric field processing is a type of nonthermal method for food preservation.

Pulsed electric fields use short pulses of electricity to inactivate microbes. In addition, the use of PEF results in minimal detrimental effects on the quality of the food. PEFs kill microorganisms and provide better maintenance of the original colour, flavour, and nutritional value of the food as compared to heat treatments. This method of preservation works by placing two electrodes between liquid juices, then applying high-voltage pulses for microseconds to milliseconds. The high-voltage pulses have an intensity in the range of 10 to 80 kV/cm.

The processing time of the juice is calculated by multiplying the number of pulses by the effective pulse duration. The high voltage of the pulses produces an electric field that results in the inactivation of microbes that may be present in the juice. The PEF temperatures are below the temperatures used in thermal processing. After the high-voltage treatment, the juice is aseptically packaged and refrigerated. Juice is also able to transfer electricity due to the presence of several ions from the processing. When the electric field is applied to the juice, electric currents are then able to flow into the liquid juice and be transferred around due to the charged molecules in the juice. Therefore, pulsed electric fields are able to inactivate microorganisms, extend shelf life, and reduce the enzymatic activity of the juice while maintaining similar quality as the original, fresh-pressed juice.

=== Emerging or aspirational technologies ===
Fruit juices contain compounds that can be undesirable to consumers. Apple juices can be cloudy, and grapefruit juices can be bitter. Enzymatic technologies, involving respectively pectinases and naringinase, address these problems.

== Health effects ==
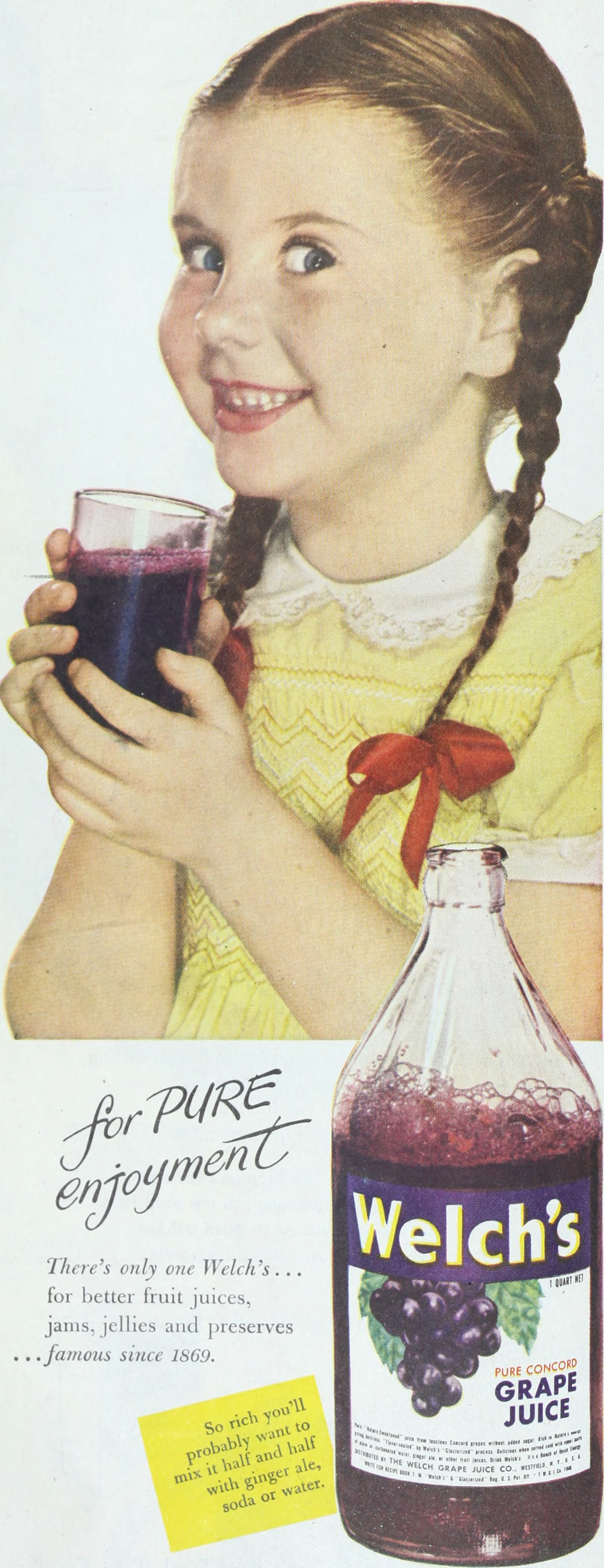
Advertisers often urge parents to buy juice for their children.

Juices are often consumed for their perceived health benefits. For example, orange juice with natural or added vitamin C, folic acid, and potassium. Juice provides nutrients such as carotenoids, polyphenols, and vitamin C that offer health benefits.

High consumption of fruit juice with added sugar may be linked to weight gain, but not all studies have shown this effect. If 100% from fruit, juice can help meet daily intake recommendations for some nutrients.

=== 100% fruit juice ===
Research suggests that 100% fruit juice is not associated with an increased risk of diabetes. A 2018 review concluded that 100% fruit juice increases the risk of tooth decay in children, but there is "no conclusive evidence that consumption of 100% fruit juice has adverse health effects." A 2025 umbrella review concluded that "the balance of evidence does not support the exclusion of 100% juice from food-based guides to healthy eating".

=== Cranberry juice ===
Preliminary research indicates that cranberry juice or capsules may decrease the number of urinary tract infections in women with frequent infections, and a more substantial Cochrane review concludes that there is some evidence that cranberry products reduce the risk of symptomatic urinary tract infections for women, children, and people following intervention, but not for the elderly, people with bladder emptying problems, or pregnant women. Long-term tolerance is also an issue, with gastrointestinal upset occurring in more than 30% of people.

=== Negative effects ===
As of 2017, the American Academy of Pediatrics says that fruit juice should not be given to children under the age of one due to its lack of nutritional benefit. For children ages one to six, intake of fruit juice should be limited to less than 4–6 oz (110–170 g) per day (about a half to three-quarters of a cup) due to its high sugar and low fiber content compared to fruit. Overconsumption of fruit juices may reduce nutrient intake compared to eating whole fruits and may produce diarrhea, gas, abdominal pain, bloating, or tooth decay.

Overconsumption of fruits and fruit juice may contribute to dental decay and cavities via the effect of fruit acids on tooth enamel. Longitudinal prospective cohort studies showed a significantly increased risk of type 2 diabetes when juices with added sugars were consumed compared to eating whole fruits. A 2014 review found that a higher intake of sugar-sweetened fruit juice was significantly associated with a higher risk of type 2 diabetes.

Overconsumption of fruit juice with added sugars has also been linked to childhood obesity. The American Journal of Public Health proposed that the Healthy Hunger-Free Kids Act of 2010 in the United States eliminate 100% fruit juices and substitute them instead with whole fruits.

== Juice bars ==
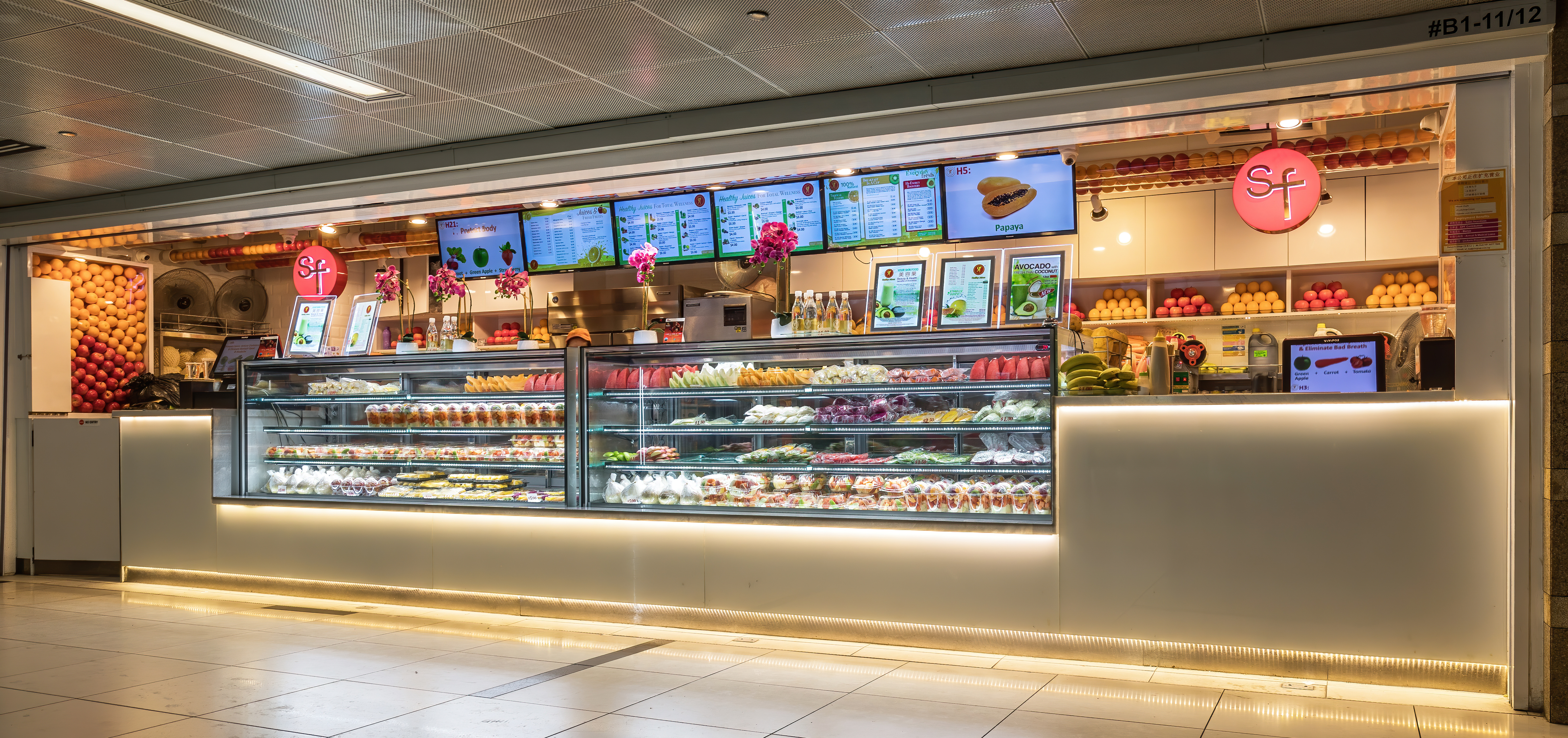
Juice bar selling fresh oranges, red apples and other fruits behind a display case, in Singapore

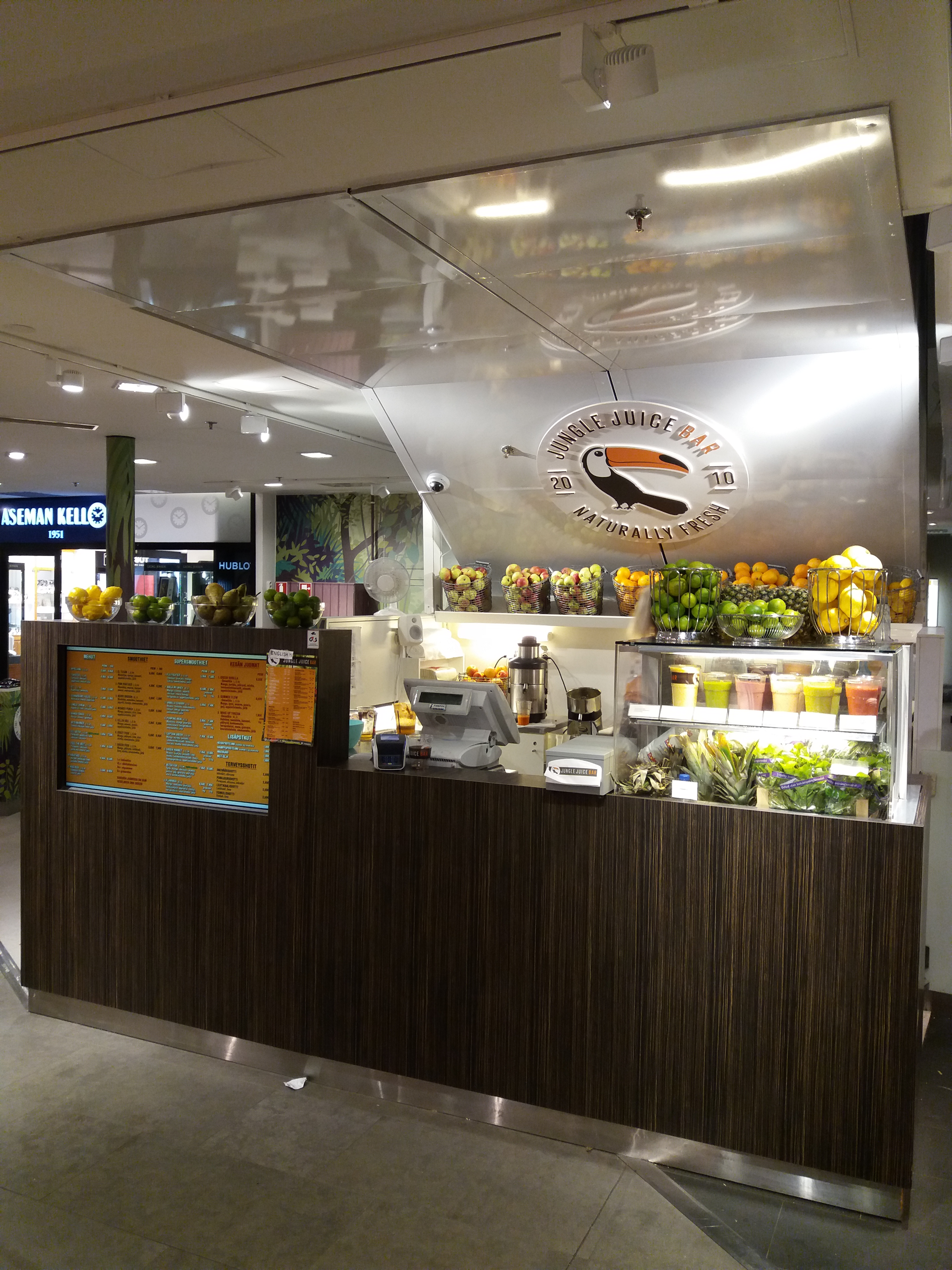
A juice drinks serving Jungle Juice Bar at the Galleria Esplanad shopping mall in Helsinki, Finland

A juice bar is an establishment that primarily serves prepared juice beverages such as freshly squeezed or extracted fruit juices, juice blends, fruit smoothies (a thick fruit drink, often iced), or other juices such as fresh wheatgrass juice. Sometimes other solid ingredients or nutritional supplements may be added as boosters, such as fresh bananas, nuts or nut butter, bodybuilding supplements, soy protein powder, or others such as whey or hemp protein powders, wheat germ, spirulina, or chlorella. Also, if less juice is used with these same ingredients, drinks called health shakes may be produced.

Juice bars share some of the characteristics of a coffeehouse, a soda fountain, a café, and a snack bar, such as providing blended drinks and food, such as sandwiches. Juice bars may be standalone businesses in cities or located at gyms, along commuter areas, near lunchtime areas, at beaches, or at tourist attractions. In Mexico, juice bars have become more popular in the 2000s. Mexican juice bars often also sell healthy beverages and snacks.

== Figurative uses ==
The use of the word "juice" to mean "liquor" (alcohol) dates from 1828. The use of the term "juice" to mean "electricity" dates from 1896. As a verb, the word "juice" was first recorded as meaning "to enliven" in 1964. The adjective "juiced" is recorded as meaning "drunk" in 1946 and "enhanced or as if enhanced by steroids" in 2003. The adjective "juicy" has meant "succulent" since the 15th century (e.g., a juicy roast beef). The figurative meaning "wealthy, full of some desired quality" dates from the 1620s (e.g., a pirate calling a heavily laden ship he aims to plunder a "juicy catch"). The meaning "lively, suggestive, racy, sensational" (e.g., a juicy scandal) is from 1883.

== In religion ==
The Catholic Church allows the use of unfermented grape juice in communion in the form of Must for cases where people are unable to drink alcohol.

== See also ==
- List of juices
- Juice cleanse
