= Rising film evaporator =

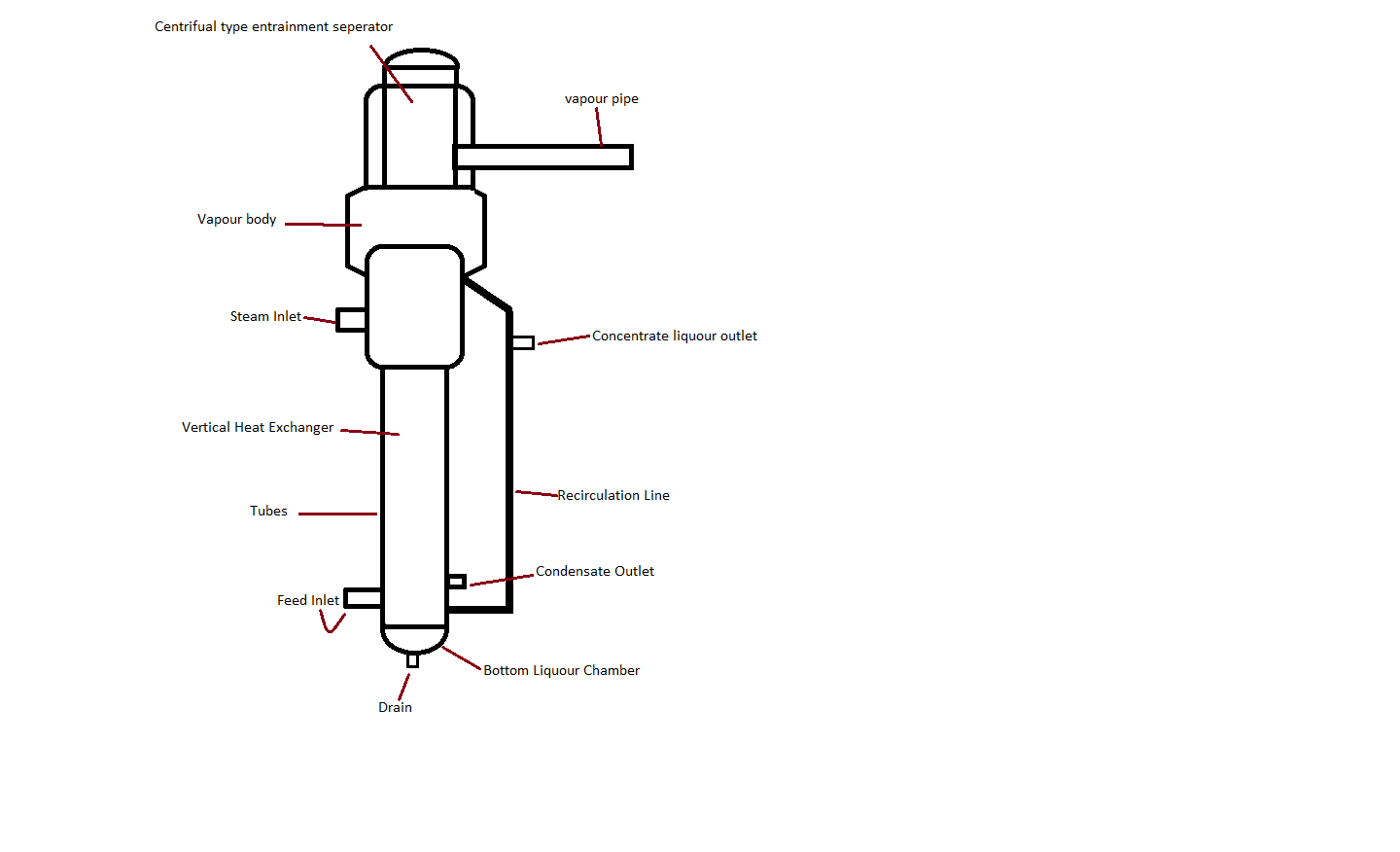
Rising Film Evaporator Diagram

A rising film or vertical long tube evaporator is a type of evaporator that is essentially a vertical shell and tube heat exchanger. The liquid being evaporated is fed from the bottom into long tubes and heated with steam condensing on the outside of the tube from the shell side. This is to produce steam and vapour within the tube bringing the liquid inside to a boil. The vapour produced then presses the liquid against the walls of the tubes and causes the ascending force of this liquid. As more vapour is formed, the centre of the tube will have a higher velocity which forces the remaining liquid against the tube wall forming a thin film which moves upwards. This phenomenon of the rising film gives the evaporator its name.

Applications: There is a wide range of applications for rising tube evaporators, including effluent treatment, production of polymers, food production, thermal desalination, pharmaceuticals, and solvent recovery. Aschner, F.S. & Schaal, M. & Hasson, D. (1971). “Large Long-Tube Evaporators for Seawater Distillation. In terms of applications within these industries, rising tube evaporators are mainly used as reboilers for distillation columns, or as pre-concentrators or flash evaporators or pre-heaters designed to remove volatile components prior to stripping.

Thermal desalination. A specific application of rising tube evaporators is the thermal desalination of sea water. Sea water is pumped into the long tubes of the evaporator while the heating media (usually steam) heats it up. As vapour forms inside the tubes it flows upwards. This evaporation occurs under vacuum conditions that allow for the use of lower temperatures.

Juice concentration and food processing:- The food industry requires handling of delicate products that are sensitive to high temperature for long periods of time. Rising film evaporators can operate quickly and efficiently enough to avoid having to expose the product to high temperatures which may damage or undermine its quality. Hence, they are suitable to use as concentrators for juices, milk and other dairy products which are products that require delicate handling in the food industry.

== Advantages and limitations ==
=== Low residence time ===
The main advantage of the rising film evaporator is the low residence time of the liquid feed in the evaporator compared to other evaporator designs like plate-type evaporators. This is crucial because it allows the usage of the evaporator in higher operating temperatures and gives assurance of high product quality despite the product being heat sensitive. Additional advantage is the availability of the option to operate the evaporator as a continuous process which is overall more energy and time efficient than a batch process operation.

High heat transfer coefficients:- Another significant advantage is the relatively high heat transfer coefficient of this evaporator type. This is essential as it reduces the overall heat transfer area requirement which in turn will lower the initial capital cost of the evaporator. This is accentuated by the fact that the components, which consist of a shell and tubes, are easily obtainable with customized designs making them cost effective for construction and ideal for simple evaporation requirements. Moreover, this type of evaporator also can easily contain those widely available vapour separators for foaming products.

=== Low efficiency ===
While the rising film evaporators are relatively efficient and have several advantages, some literature suggests that they are not as efficient as the vertical or the horizontal tube falling film evaporator. As such, in recent times falling film evaporators are usually chosen in place of rising film evaporators because they have similar advantages as rising film evaporators and have the additional benefits of better efficiency. Moreover, rising film evaporators requires a driving force to move the film against gravity and this causes a limitation because there is a requirement for a sufficient temperature difference between the heating surfaces to provide the driving force.

Limited product versatility:- Another major limitation of rising film evaporators is the requirement for the products to be of low viscosity and have minimal fouling tendencies. Competitive process designs like plate-type evaporators can handle liquids that are more viscous with higher fouling tendencies because the inner parts are more easily accessible for cleaning and maintenance.

== Main characteristic and assessments ==
Evaporators have the aim of concentrating a solution by vaporising the solvent. To assess the performance of a rising film evaporator, the capacity and efficiency of the evaporator is measured. Capacity is the amount of water vaporized per unit time while the steam economy is the amount of solvent vaporised. Hence, the main process attributes are the characteristics of the process that significantly affect these two areas.

=== Overall rate of heat transfer ===
Considering that rising film evaporators use the same heat transfer principle as a general shell and tube heat exchanger. Therefore, the overall heat transfer rate is crucial in determining the performance of the evaporator. This factor will determine the capacity of the rising film evaporator. The fundamental general formula which gives the overall heat transfer rate is,

$Q = UAT_lm$	1

where

Q is the heat transfer Rate
U is the overall heat transfer coefficient
A is the overall heat transfer area
T_{lm} is the temperature difference or log mean temperature difference

For a general shell and tube heat exchanger, U is given by the equation

$\frac {1}{U} = \frac{1}{h_o}+\frac {1}{h_od}+ \frac {d_o \ln \frac{d_o}{d_i}}{2k_w}+ \frac {d_o}{d_i} \frac {1}{h_id}+\frac {d_o}{d_i}\frac {1}{h_i}$	2

where

h_{o} is the outside fluid film coefficient
h_{i} is the inside fluid film coefficient
h_{od} is the outside dirt coefficient (fouling factor)
h_{id} is the inside dirt coefficient
k_{w} is the thermal conductivity of the tube wall material
d_{i} is the tube inside diameter
d_{o} is the tube outside diameter

A is given by the equation

$A=N\pi l d_o$	3

where

N is the total number of tubes
l is the length of the tubes
d_{o} is the tube outside diameter

This is the contact area of heat transfer which involves the outer surface area of the long vertical tubes that are parallel and in direct contact with the heating media housed within the shell of the evaporator.

The log mean temperature difference (LMTD), T_{lm}, is given by the equation

$T_{lm} = \left(T_{hi}-T_{co}\right) - \left(T_{ho}-T_{ci}\right) \over \ln \frac{\left(T_{hi}-T_{co}\right)}{\left(T_{ho}-T_{ci}\right)}$	4

where

T_{hi} is the hot fluid inlet temperature
T_{ho} is the hot fluid outlet temperature
T_{ci} is the cold fluid inlet temperature
T_{co} is the cold fluid outlet temperature

The hot fluid in the case of the rising film evaporator would be the steam in the shell side and the cold fluid would be the liquid inside the long tubes. In relation to the overall heat transfer rate, there are several key parameters that affect this characteristic specifically in terms of a rising film evaporator.

=== Heat transfer coefficients ===
For a rising film evaporator, the main paths of heat transfer are conduction and convection. These occur as the steam in the shell side heats up the tube and as the tube heats up the liquid and vapour within. The design of the long vertical tubes in rising tube evaporators promote the formation of the long, thin and continual film of liquid formed by the pressure exerted by the vapour which occupies the centre part of the tube and rises up. This ascending motion of film and vapour in the centre promotes great turbulence which then allows for higher heat transfer coefficients leading to a better efficiency heat transfer. Another significant factor that affects the value of the heat transfer coefficients is the design of the evaporator.

=== Log mean temperature difference ===
According to the laws of heat transfer, initially the heat transfer rate increases as the temperature difference increases to approach the boiling point of the materials in the case of a constant feed flow rate. Hence, it is generally good to have a large temperature difference for this process. However, as the vapour bubbles gradually fill the entire centre of the tube, the steam pressure reaches a peak value. Beyond this point, the temperature difference, which acts as the main driving force for the heat transfer and also the rising film, will start reducing if there is any increase in steam pressure. In addition to that, there are other constraints in terms of the product quality and consistency when considering increasing the temperature difference. The temperature difference for driving force is also defined heavily by the properties of steam and the boiling liquid.

=== Overall heat transfer area ===
This is the total contact area between the heating media and the liquid requiring the heating or any intermediate surfaces in between them. In the case of the rising film evaporator this is the specific region between the film and the surface of long tubes and also the surrounding heating media within the shell of the evaporator. As shown in the equation, the heat transfer area is one of the chief factors that affect the rate of conductive heat transfer. Therefore, it would be favourable to maximise the amount of area available for heat transfer. The limitations for these can be in terms of the cost per unit area as increasing the area would mean increasing the length of the tubes and also the shell of the evaporator which can significantly increase the cost of construction and maintenance,.

       Thickness of the rising film:-

The rising film which is formed due to the pressure of the vapor within the vertical tubes greatly influences the efficiency of the heat transfer. This is because the thickness of the film will affect the heat transfer coefficients as well as the contact area for heat transfer. In relation to this, a thin and long film is favored as it reduces the distance between the two heat transfer surfaces. This would give higher heat transfer coefficients and overall heat transfer rate.

=== Residence time ===
Residence time indicates the time taken for the product to undergo the entire procedure. This can be generalised to mean residence time of a product, which specifies the mean time of the product stays within the evaporator. In many industries, especially for food and beverage manufacturing, clients’ requirement would greatly limit the residence time to be as short to minimise the potential destruction of nutrients through exposure to intense heat.

This can be solved in various ways such as having a pre-heating system prior to the main evaporator with the function of heating the liquid feed until the temperature almost approaches the boiling point. This will lower the load capacity of evaporator and reduce the residence time.

== Designs available ==
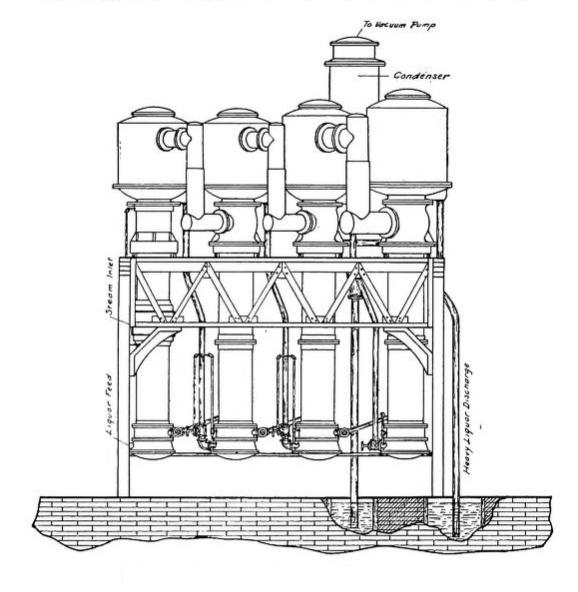
Kestner climbing film evaporator

A number of various evaporator designs have been developed using the fundamental principles of the rising film evaporator, thermo-siphon. The available designs for the evaporators are mostly customized by private companies and industries depending on the required application in producing the desired products. This is essential in order to ensure that the optimal product is obtained while maximising the efficiency and cost effectiveness of the design.

=== Artisan Rising Film Evaporator ===
Artisan Industries is a company specializes in customizing thermal separation equipment. The Artisan Rising Film Evaporator has similar basic fundamental as the general design of a long-tube vertical evaporator, but it is modified to allow for handling of more viscous and volatile material which the orthodox design may not be able to handle due to excessive fouling.

In relation to that, the Artisan Rising Film Evaporator is designed to eliminate the majority of the volatile components before stripping and is usually used as a flash evaporator or pre-heater. This design allows the operator to control the feed rate or steam rate in order to remove residues, to adjust to the product behaviour, and to maximise steam economy. This evaporator is appropriate for high temperature application and materials with high viscosity that has a propensity to foul the transfer surfaces.

=== Rising Thin Film Vacuum Evaporator ===
The Rising Thin Film Vacuum Evaporator design is modification on the original rising film evaporator which has the main difference of allowing the liquid evaporates at lower temperature. This is possible because it operates under vacuum conditions which also avoid undesired formation in the liquid. This design is created to re-concentrate a diluted solution to its desired concentration by evaporation while also allowing evaporated water to condense simultaneously and be recovered for either recirculation or other purposes. There are many different types of Rising Thin Film Vacuum Evaporator models operating with different capacity, concentration control, types of condenser design to obtain the product at optimal condition. In addition to that, this design is compact, allows easy maintenance of solution concentration and applicable to highly corrosive and effervescent liquids.

=== Semi Kestner ===
Semi Kestner, also known as Semi-Rising Film Evaporator, is widely used in sugar industries. This equipment provides Polly-baffle catcher to avoid juice entrapment and there would be more effective juice distribution by means of juice coil and Flushing of juice. This design has high brix of syrup and high vapour pressure is supplied as less steam quantity is required. With short retention time of liquor and good heat transfer design features, the juice flows back without any discharge by going through the heating surface only once.

== Guidelines for designs being considered ==
=== Determining the suitable temperature difference ===
The temperature difference which is log mean temperature difference between the heating media and the boiling liquid must be high enough to generate sufficient ascending force of the steam vapour in the tube side to force the liquid film to flow upwards. In general, the greater the temperature difference, the better the driving force of the steam. Additionally, having a high temperature difference will also increase the flow rate of the liquid and vapour within the tube. This increase in flow rate causes higher turbulence which results in an increase of the heat transfer coefficient. However, the overall temperature difference has to be within the range of boiling points of the two components as it could affect the quality and the purity of the products.

=== Sizing ===
The determination of the size of a rising film evaporator is generally a sensitive task because it involves obtaining a good understanding of the process requirements and behaviour of the materials involved. In terms of cost efficiency, it is generally accepted that long and thin tubes are relatively cheaper because the thicker shell sizes for shell and tube heat exchangers are usually more expensive. Nonetheless, while weighing in the cost of the construction against the requirement, the size can be always adjusted and customized depending on the required application in producing the desired products. Generally the size of the length ranges between 4 and 8 m and 25 mm to 50 mm in diameter.

=== Thermal economy ===
Thermal economy is something major to deliberate in the designing of a rising tube evaporator. In order to optimise this, parameters in the design that have great influence on the thermal economy have to be considered. One major factor is the overall heat transfer area. In order to maximise the thermal economy it is generally acceptable to maximise the heat transfer area as a larger area would give a higher heat transfer rate. Despite that, increasing the area of the heat transfer may include complications in terms of increasing the different dimensions of the evaporator which in results increases the cost of construction in addition to being subject to other limitations such as space and design constraints.
