= Circulation evaporator =

Type of evaporating unit to separate mixtures

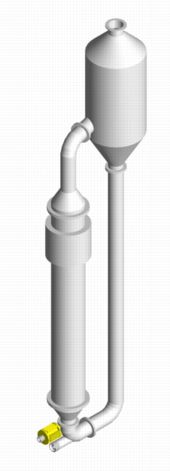
Evaporator

Circulation evaporators are a type of evaporating unit designed to separate mixtures unable to be evaporated by a conventional evaporating unit. Circulation evaporation incorporates the use of both heat exchangers and flash separation units in conjunction with circulation of the solvent in order to remove liquid mixtures without conventional boiling. There are two types of Circulation Evaporation; Natural Circulation Evaporators and Forced Circulation Evaporators, both of which are still currently used in industry today, although forced Circulation systems, which have a circulation pump as opposed to natural systems with no driving force, have a much wider range of appropriate uses.

== Design of natural/forced circulation evaporators ==
Evaporators are designed with two key objectives: Is the equipment to be selected best suited for the duty, and is the arrangement the most efficient and economical. Heat transfer greatly affects evaporator design, as it represents the greatest cost in its operation. The most suitable evaporator will have the highest heat transfer coefficient per dollar of equipment cost. In optimising the design of an evaporator, another important consideration is the steam economy (kg of solvent evaporated per kilogram of steam used). The best way to achieve high economies (which can be well over 100%) is to use multiple effect evaporator, whereby the vapour from one evaporator – or effect – is used to heat the feed in the next effect, where boiling occurs at lower pressure and temperature Thermo-compression of the vapour, whereby the vapour will condense at a temperature high enough to be reused for the next effect through compression, will also increase efficiency. However, increased energy efficiency can only be achieved through higher capital costs and a general rule is the larger the system, the more it will pay back to increase the thermal efficiency of the evaporator.

Heat transfer is not the sole design criteria however, as the most appropriate evaporator also depends on properties of the feed and products. Crystallisation, salting and scaling, product quality and its heat sensitivity, foaming potential of the solution, viscosity of feed (which increases with evaporation) and its nature (slurry or concentrate) all need to be considered. For Single Effect Evaporators that are used in small scale processes with low throughput of material, material and energy balances can be used to design and optimise the process. In designing multiple effect evaporators, trial and error methods with many iterations are usually the fastest and most efficient. The general steps in design are as follows, and would be carried out in excel for ease of calculation. Other design software such as Aspen Plus could also be used with built in functions for process equipment.

1) Estimate temperature distribution in the evaporator, taking into account boiling-point elevations. If all heating surfaces are to be equal, temperature drop across each effect will be approximately inversely proportional to the heat transfer coefficient in that effect.

2) Determine total evaporation required, and estimate steam consumption for the number of effects chosen.

3) Calculate evaporation in the first effect from assumed feed temperature or flowrate. Repeat for following effects, and check that initial and intermediate assumptions are still valid. Also, determine whether product quality has met required specifications at the last effect.

4) Check to see if the heat requirements have been met and product meets desired specifications. If not, repeat previous steps with different assumption of steam flow into the first effect.

5) Now that concentrations in each effect are known, recalculate boiling point rises to determine the heat loads. Using this information revise assumed temperature differences heat transfer coefficients, then determine heating surface requirements.

6) Given enough data, based on the above conditions, heat transfer coefficients can then be calculated more rigorously, and surface heating requirements adjusted accordingly to give a more reliable design representative of the physical system itself.

Once the evaporator components themselves have been designed, ancillary equipment such as pumps (particularly for forced circulation evaporators) and heaters would need to be designed and/or specified for the system to give a reliable performance and cost estimate of the system as a whole. These would be based on the specifications determined in the calculations above.

== Main characteristics ==
The main process characteristics are those based around evaporation specifically through heat exchange and pressure manipulation. It is a flash separation procedure that includes the heating of a base liquid mixture and forced circulation through the system via pumping.

=== Physical characteristics ===
Forced/Natural Circulation Evaporation is used when boiling of base liquids is undesired. It was developed specifically for processing and separation of liquids in which crystallising and scaling occurs. The evaporator uses separate parts to create the overall system; a heat exchanger, separation tank and for the forced circulation system (as opposed to the natural circulation system) a circulation pump are standard although can be subject to change depending on the liquids properties of the mixtures being separated and specific design. The units in the heat exchanger (where thermal transfer takes place) are called the heating units or calandria (for single tube heat exchangers). The liquid-vapor separation tank is called a flash separator, flash chamber or flash vessel. The basic module of an evaporator is known as the “body” of the evaporator and refers to the calandria and the flash chamber. The term “effect” is used to describe the body where vapor is extracted from the raw material and is operating at the same boiling point.

=== System characteristics ===
Evaporation is the elimination of the solvent in form of vapor from a solution. For most evaporation systems, the solvent is water and the heat is provided by steam condensation. In a forced circulation evaporation liquid is constantly circulated through the system. The mixture moves through the heat exchanger where it is superheated under pressure. To avoid fouling a high circulation rate is used, typically between 1.5 – 4 m/s although this ultimately depends on the component properties and is easily manipulated by the circulation pump. The liquid is pressurised through the heat exchanger externally by pressure stabilisers such as valves or orifices or hydrostatically within the system.

Heating of the liquid across the heat exchanger is kept minimal with a standard temperature difference of 2 - 3 K. As the liquid enters the flash vessel the pressure is reduced to slightly below that of the heat exchanger and flash evaporation occurs. The vapor stream is separated out of the liquid stream. This vapor is usually not the desired product from the evaporation unit. As such the vapor can be either collected or disposed of depending on the system. The enriched liquid solution is then either collected in the same way as the vapor or recirculated through the system again.

This results in a high recirculation ratio within the range of 100–150 kg of liquid (solvent) recirculated per Kg of vapor removed. These high recirculation rates result in high liquor velocities through the tube and in turn minimize the buildup of crystals, other deposits and in turn minimize fouling. In crystallisation applications, crystallisation still occurs in the flash separator and in some specific systems a further separation of solid particles from the recirculated slurry is needed.

=== Assessment of characteristics ===
When designing a forced circulation evaporator there are 3 considerations to address; the heat transferred, the liquid vapor separation and the energy consumption efficiency. All of these considerations need to be maximized in order to create an efficient system. As circulation and heating are maintained for the system, liquid temperatures and flow rates can be controlled specifically to suit the product requirements and as such optimum tube velocities can be reached resulting in an efficiently designed system that addresses the design considerations.

Forced Circulation Evaporators have high liquid velocity and therefore a high turbulence this ergo equates to high heat transfer coefficients. The system contains positive circulation, freedom from high fouling, scaling or salting and is suitable for corrosive and viscous solutions.

The operating characteristics are specifically manipulated to fit the application criteria. Forced Circulation Evaporators are however versatile in their application and can be used in a wide variety of applications (see applications). For instance they are ideal for crystallising operations. Concentration values of forced circulation evaporators can handle more than the limits of conventional tubular evaporators when handling feed with dissolved salts and is often used as a finishing evaporator for concentration of liquids to high solid content following low solids multi-stage, TVR or MVR evaporation.

Multiple heating effects can be used to increase thermal efficiency. In this system design extracted vapor is used as a heating medium for the 2nd heating effect at a lower pressure than the first effect. This can be repeated for multiple effects.

=== Natural Circulation evaporator characteristics ===
Natural Circulation evaporation is essentially based upon natural convection currents manipulated through the system piping to create circulation. Circulation through convection is achieved through bubble formation. Bubble are of lower density and rise through the liquid to promote upward lift into the evaporating vessel.

Physically Natural circulation evaporators use a short tube bundle within the batch pan or by having an external shell and tube heat exchanger outside of the main vessel (as shown in the diagram) External heating through heat exchangers is normally used as it has the advantage that it is not dependent on the calandria size or shape. As such larger capacities for the flash separation tank can be obtained.

Removing of the circulation pump reduces the operating costs, however due to characteristics of the system as mentioned above the evaporator has a long residence time and low flow rates, making its uses severely more limited than a forced circulation evaporator. The most common application of Natural Circulation evaporation is as a reboiler for distillation columns.

== System designs available ==
Currently, a wide range of forced circulation evaporators are available that are specifically tailored to carry out distinct applications.

Plate Forced Circulation Evaporators utilize a centrifugal pump which forces liquid to circulate through the plate structures and heat exchanger. The flexibility of this design is a major advantage, as the rate of evaporation can be manipulated by either adding or removing extra plates, allowing it to perform a wide range of duties that require greater heat transfer co-efficient. More specifically, products with higher viscosity have been better suited to this design, with the plate forced circulation evaporator demonstrating higher performance and improved evaporation with comparison to the tubular forced circulation system. The liquid must undergo superheated temperature, which exceeds the original boiling point of the liquid by a large degree, forcing rapid evaporation. In addition, to flexibility, this system is compact, only needing small space and is easy to clean and maintain as plates are readily accessible. With regards to suitability, this design is currently being used in processes that involve liquids with low to medium evaporation rates and consist of minute portions of undissolved solutes with close to no capacity to induce fouling.

Tubular forced circulation evaporators employs an axial circulation pump which navigates the flow of liquid in a circular motion through the system's heat exchanger in which it is superheated. Thereafter, when the liquid reaches the separator the liquid pressure decreases dramatically forcing a portion of the liquid to be rapidly boiled off. This design is specifically for products and/ or particulates with a diameter of over 2mm. As the evaporation action occurs only in the separator and not in the heat exchanger, fouling is reduced despite higher levels of turbulence in the design. Alternatively, another design parameter is the optimisation of liquid velocity in the tube side flow which is regulated by the circulation pump.

Forced circulation evaporators in the food industry use modified designs that mimic the original system however involve extra secondary steam units to enhance forced circulation flow. Whilst the single effect design employs a condenser unit to stimulate a condensation action subsequent to vapour inflow from the heat exchanger, the double effect design does a similar duty however the extra component acts to reduce the overall pressure in the system. In comparison, the triple effect system is used when high levels of effective evaporation are needed with minimum labour. In this design, the liquid enters the third effect at a low temperature and moves to the second stream in which concentration is increased due to the previous evaporation effect. Finally, the optimum product concentration is achieved in the first effect.

With regards to the design components within forced circulation evaporation systems, the heat exchangers can vary. Shell and tube exchangers are the most widely apparent as a result of the flexible design that can accommodate various pressure and temperature values. Forced circulation exchangers can employ either horizontal or vertical shell and tube heat exchangers, allowing the exchange of heat between fluids within and outside the tubes (that exist inside the heat exchanger). Liquids with high levels of solute usually require vertical heat exchangers which are more commonly used.

== Waste ==
Evaporation generally deals with evaporation of water from a mixture or solution, containing another liquid or fine solids. This concentrated stream is in most cases the product and as such the only waste stream is pure water, which poses no risk to the environment and may be disposed into the stormwater/ sewage system. For the case where the concentrate is the waste stream, such as in evaporation of saltwater to produce potable water, the salt concentrate should be dispersed back into the oceans, or further dried and sent off for disposal/ use in other operations. For most cases, there are no hazardous waste streams associated with natural and forced circulation evaporators.

== Advantages and limitations ==
=== Advantages ===
Natural/forced circulation evaporators have many advantages, making them the more popular choice of evaporator in industry.

The liquid entering the circulation evaporator will boil in the separator, not on a heating surface, hence minimising fouling, whereas with plate evaporators, boiling will occur on a heating surface. It is for this reason that circulation evaporators are preferred for liquids with a higher tendency to foul. Minimal fouling also means that the cleaning cycles are not as frequent as with other evaporators such as plate evaporators.

Circulation evaporators are fairly compact and are easy to clean and operate. They can also be easily adapted according to the product that needs to be obtained. They have a high heat transfer coefficient as well as a high circulation flow, which both work to increase the efficiency of the evaporator.

=== Limitations ===
One of the main limitations of the forced/natural circulation evaporators is the cost. Circulation evaporators have particularly high construction costs, whereas falling film evaporators have a low investment cost. Falling film evaporators has no rotating internal part, and hence experience no mechanical deterioration, whilst circulation evaporators have high maintenance costs.

Although previously described as an advantage, there is also a down side to the high circulation flow. The increased velocity can cause the equipment to corrode at a faster rate, which will increase the overall cost of running the evaporator considering how expensive it is to maintain compared to other evaporators.

== Applications ==
Natural/forced circulation evaporators have a major role in the food and beverage industry. Specifically, they can be used for processes that produce tomato juice concentrate, (tropical and berry) fruit concentrate, and when water needs to be removed from certain raw materials in such a way as to maintain the raw material properties.

In general, forced circulation evaporators are required when the fouling characteristics of a liquid will cause problems if the liquid boils on a heating surface. These evaporators are also used for liquids with a high solids content and a high viscosity.

There are several other processes that require the use of forced circulation evaporators, which work particularly well as crystallising evaporators. These include processes that produce salt, corn steep water and calcium carbonate.

Natural circulation evaporators are used in other processes such as those that produce anhydrous sodium hydroxide (caustic), sugar beet, liquors that are particularly foamy, or those that have a low to moderate viscosity, and precipitating liquids.

Natural/forced circulation evaporators are also necessary in effluent treatment plants, and in both the chemical and pharmaceutical industry.

== New developments ==
Improvements in the design of the forced/natural circulation evaporators have had significant implications for industrial products and processes. The advent of self-cleaning exchangers installations containing an external circulating motion for particles has drastically reduced levels of fouling. Moreover, the use of forced circulation evaporators in multi-effect evaporation plants, as described earlier in the designs available section, have significantly broadened the applications for liquids that have high viscosities, can be easily deposited and require higher concentrations. Further evidence can be extracted from the case study regarding the North Italy landfill, in which biogas in a single effect evaporator could not completely evaporate the leachate. As a result, a triple effect forced circulation evaporator was utilized.
