= Falling film evaporator =

Industrial device

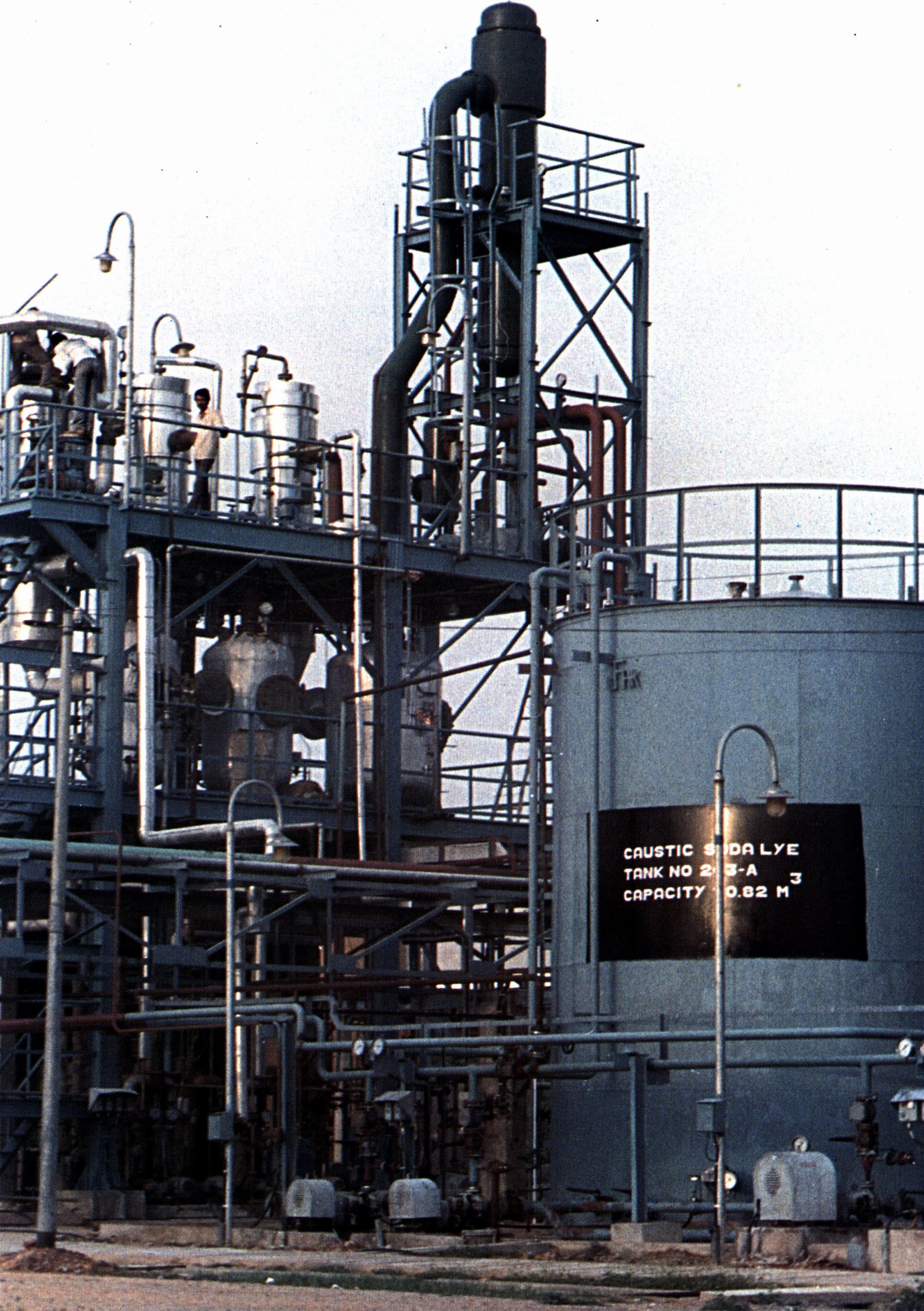
Fig. 1 - A falling film triple effect evaporator for caustic soda

A falling film evaporator is an industrial device to concentrate solutions, especially with heat sensitive components. The evaporator is a special type of heat exchanger.

== General ==
In general evaporation takes place inside vertical tubes, but there are also applications where the process fluid evaporates on the outside of horizontal or vertical tubes. In all cases, the process fluid to be evaporated flows downwards by gravity as a continuous film. The fluid will create a film along the tube walls, progressing downwards (falling) - hence the name.

The fluid distributor has to be designed carefully in order to maintain an even liquid distribution for all tubes along which the solution falls. A typical distributor is shown in Fig. 2; these distributors are usually called ferrules due to their concentric shape. In the majority of applications the heating medium is placed on the outside of the tubes. High heat transfer coefficients are required in order to achieve equally balanced heat transfer resistances. Therefore, condensing steam is commonly used as a heating medium.

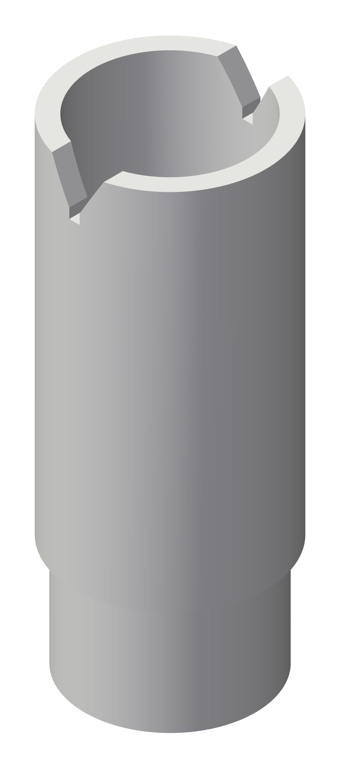
Fig. 2 - Falling film evaporator ferrule

For internally evaporating fluids, separation between the liquid phase (the solution) and the gaseous phase takes place inside the tubes. In order to maintain conservation of mass as this process proceeds, the downward vapor velocity increases, increasing the shear force acting on the liquid film and therefore also the velocity of the solution. The result can be a high film velocity of a progressively thinner film resulting in increasingly turbulent flow. The combination of these effects allows very high heat transfer coefficients.

The heat transfer coefficient on the evaporating side of the tube is mostly determined by the hydrodynamic flow conditions of the film. For low mass flows or high viscosities the film flow can be laminar, in which case heat transfer is controlled purely by conduction through the film. Therefore in this condition the heat transfer coefficient decreases with increased mass flow. With increased mass flow the film becomes wavy laminar and then turbulent. Under turbulent conditions the heat transfer coefficient increases with increased flow.

Evaporation takes place at very low mean temperature differences between heating medium and process stream, typically between 3 - 6K, therefore these devices are ideal for heat recovery in multi stage processes. A further advantage of the falling film evaporator is the very short residence time of the liquid and the absence of superheating of the same. Not considering the vapour separator, the residence time inside the tubes is measured in seconds, making it ideal for heat-sensitive products such as milk, fruit juice, pharmaceuticals, and many others.

Falling film evaporators are also characterised by very low pressure drops; therefore, they are often used in deep vacuum applications.

== Fouling ==
Due to the intimate contact of the liquid with the heating surface, these evaporators are sensitive to fouling from precipitating solids. Low liquid velocity at the inlet is usually not sufficient to perform an effective self-cleaning of the tubes. Falling film evaporators are therefore used in clean, non-precipitating liquids. A typical application, in chemical industry, is for concentration of caustic soda.

== Falling film evaporators versus flooded evaporators ==
Falling film evaporators have a number of advantages over their flooded evaporator counterparts.

They require a lower charge, as the entire shell (in the case of horizontal evaporators) or all the tubes (in the case of a vertical evaporator) need not be filled with liquid as a thin film is now used to cover the surfaces. In industries such as heating and air-conditioning this can save significant money due to the high costs of a refrigerant charge.

Falling film evaporators also show improved heat transfer characteristics over their flooded counterparts, particularly in cases with low heat flux.

A number of disadvantages exist, primarily being the comparable lack of understanding of falling film evaporators compared to flooded evaporators, particularly for horizontal falling film evaporators. Furthermore the fluid distribution for horizontal falling film evaporators is a challenge, as the performance is severely limited if an uneven distribution of film over the tubes is created.

== Horizontal versus vertical falling film evaporators ==
Horizontal falling film evaporators have a number of potential advantages over their vertical counterparts in the petrochemical industry, such as the ability to use tubes with external enhancements; while internally-enhanced tubes are available for vertical falling film evaporators, external enhancements are typically superior for boiling applications. The chief disadvantage of horizontal falling film evaporators is that if a corrosive or fouling liquid is to be evaporated, it will have to placed on the shell side. This is against best practice, as it is easier to clean fouling found on the inside of tubes rather than the outside.

== See also ==
- Climbing and falling film plate evaporator
