= Β-L-Rhamnosidase =

Class of enzymes

β-L-Rhamnosidase

Identifiers
- EC no.: 3.2.1.43
- CAS no.: 37288-37-2

Databases
- IntEnz: IntEnz view
- BRENDA: BRENDA entry
- ExPASy: NiceZyme view
- KEGG: KEGG entry
- MetaCyc: metabolic pathway
- PRIAM: profile
- PDB structures: RCSB PDB PDBe PDBsum
Search
- PMC: articles
- PubMed: articles
- NCBI: proteins

β-L-Rhamnosidase (EC 3.2.1.43) is an enzyme with systematic name β-L-rhamnoside rhamnohydrolase. It catalyses the hydrolysis of terminal, non-reducing β-L-rhamnose residues in β-L-rhamnosides
