= Distiller (disambiguation) =

A distiller performs distillation, often to produce alcohol.

Distiller or distillers may also refer to:

- Adobe Distiller, a software application
- Distillers Company, a former Scotch whisky and pharmaceutical company
- The Distillers, an Australian-American punk rock band
  - The Distillers (EP), 1999
  - The Distillers (album), 2000
