= Naringinase =

Class of enzymes

Naringinase is a debittering enzyme that is used in the commercial production of citrus juices. It breaks down the compound naringin that gives citrus juices its bitter taste. It is a multienzyme complex which possesses alpha-L-rhamnosidase and beta glucosidase active centers. The E.C. No.(EC 3.2.1.40) of the naringinase and rhamnosidase are the same. First rhamnosidase breaks naringin into prunin and rhamnose. Lastly glucosidase breaks prunin into glucose and naringenin, a flavorless flavanone also found in various citrus.

Ram gene is a rare gene; it is found in very few microorganisms, like some Bacillus species. It is mainly present in the genus Aspergillus, but production of naringinase from fungus is a difficult task as the growth rate of fungi is much slower than that of bacteria.
