= Distillery (disambiguation) =

A distillery is a premise where distillation takes place, especially distillation of alcohol.

Distillery may also refer to:

- Lisburn Distillery F.C., formerly known as Distillery, a Northern Ireland football club
- Distillery District, a heritage district in Toronto, Canada
