= Climbing and falling film plate evaporator =

A climbing/falling film plate evaporator is a specialized type of evaporator in which a thin film of liquid is passed over a rising and falling plate to allow the evaporation process to occur. It is an extension of the falling film evaporator, and has application in any field where the liquid to be evaporated cannot withstand extended exposure to high temperatures, such as the concentration of fruit juices.

== Design ==
The basic design of the climbing/falling film plate evaporator consists of two phases. In the climbing phase, the liquid feed is heated by a flow of steam as it rises through a corrugated plate. In the subsequent falling phase, the liquid flows downward at high velocity under gravitational force. Evaporation and cooling occurs rapidly in the falling phase.

There are several design variations that are commonly used in industrial field. These include single-effect and multiple-effect evaporators. The choice of evaporator design is dictated by constraints of the process. Fundamentally, there are four factors involved in designing this evaporator:

- prevention of nucleate boiling;
- short residence time;
- waste stream production; and
- post treatment.

The main advantage of climbing/falling film plate evaporator is its short residence time. Since the liquid feed does not remain in the evaporator for long, this evaporator is suitable for heat/temperature sensitive material. Thus, this evaporator is used widely in food, beverages and pharmaceutical industries. Besides that, the colour, texture, nutritional content and taste of the liquid feed can be preserved too. Despite its functionality, this evaporator has a few drawbacks such as large energy consumption. Future development compromises installing large number of steam effects and recycle the steam where possible for better energy efficiency.

== Designs available ==
Climbing/falling film plate evaporator designs can be group into single-effect and multiple-effect film plate designs.

=== Single-effect ===
The operations for single-effect evaporator can be carried out in a batch, semi-batch, or continuous- batch or continuously. Single-effect evaporators are indicated in any of the following conditions:

- the vapor cannot be recycled as it is contaminated;
- the feed is highly corrosive, requiring expensive construction materials;
- the energy cost to produce the steam heating is low;
- the required capacity is small.

=== Thermocompression ===
Thermocompression is useful whenever evaporator energy requirements need to be reduced. This could be achieved by compressing and recycling the vapor from a single-effects evaporator into the same evaporator as the heating medium. Thermocompression of vapor can be achieved by applying the steam-jet or by using mechanical means such as compressors

- Steam Jet Thermocompression

Steam jet would be required in order to compress the vapor back to the evaporator.

- Mechanical Thermocompression

Mechanical thermocompression lies on the same principle as thermocompression but the only different is that the compression is done by reciprocating, rotary positive-displacement, centrifugal or axial-flow compressors.

=== Multiple-effect evaporators ===
The best way to reduce energy consumption is by using multiple-effect evaporators. For multiple-effect evaporators, the steam from outside is condensed by the heating element of the first effect and the vapors produced from the first effect are then recycled back to the second effect, where the feed will be partially concentrated product of the first effect. The process expands until the last effect when the final desired concentration is achieved.

== Process characteristics ==
There are several process characteristics that should be taken into account in order for the evaporator to operate at its best performance.

=== Evaporation of thin liquid film ===
Evaporation of liquid film in film evaporators is very important in order to cool the flowing liquid and the surface on which the liquid flows. It can also increase the concentration of the components in the liquid. The climbing/falling film plate evaporator is specifically designed to produce a thin film during both the climbing and falling phases. For the climbing film evaporators, the feed is introduced at the bottom of the tubes. Evaporation causes the vapor to expand thus causing a thin film of liquid to rise along the tubes. The vapor shear will push the thin film to climb up the wall of the tubes. The feed for the falling film evaporator on the other hand is introduced at the top of the tubes. The liquid flows down the tubes and it will get evaporated as it descends. The flow of the liquid down the tubes is driven by the vapor shear stress and the gravitational forces. The effect of the vapor shear and the gravity will lead to a higher flow rates and shorter residence time. The flow of the thin liquid film in the falling film evaporator is possible in two ways: cocurrent and countercurrent. It is cocurrent if the vapor is drawn from the top to the bottom of the tubes and vice versa for the countercurrent flow. The cocurrent flow will increase the flow rates resulting in a shorter residence time. The type of flow can be described in figure 2.

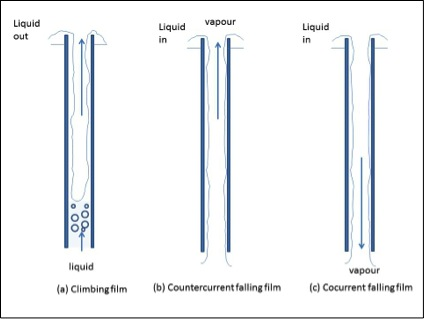
Figure 2: Examples of film evaporators

=== Heat transfer characteristic ===
The heat transfer performance of the climbing and falling film plate evaporator is affected by several factors, including the height of the feed inside the tube and the temperature difference. The height of the feed water is inversely related to the climbing film height. The low height of feed water will lead to the high height of climbing film. Higher height of the climbing film will increase the percentage of saturated flow boiling region therefore it will lead to an increase in the local heat transfer coefficient. The optimum height ratio of feed water is found to be R_{h} = 0.3. Any height ratio less than 0.3 will cause the local heat transfer coefficient to decrease. Besides that, small liquid content in the tube can minimize the foaming problem.

The combination of climbing and falling film evaporator allows the evaporator to operate within a wide temperature range. The evaporators can operate in a small temperature difference between the heating medium and the liquid. This is due to the lack of hydrostatic pressure drop in the evaporator. The lack of hydrostatic pressure drop will eliminate the temperature drop thus causing the temperature to be relatively uniform. Besides that, the local heat transfer coefficient inside the tube is depending on the change in temperature. A minimum threshold of change in temperature (ΔT) of 5 °C was found by Luopeng Yang in one of his experiments. If the change in temperature is less than 5 °C, the liquid film will not be able to travel up the tubes which resulting in a drop of local heat transfer coefficient in the tube.

=== Residence time ===
Since the evaporator is mainly used in processes dealing with heat-sensitive materials, the residence time should be kept as low as possible. Residence time is the time taken for the product to be in contact with heat. To improve the product quality, short heat contact period from single pass operation can minimize product deterioration. The climbing and falling film plate evaporator is capable of satisfying this requirement. Short residence time can be achieved by higher liquid flow rates down the tube in the falling film evaporator. The effect of gravitational force will increase the flow rate of the liquid resulting in the short residence time.

== Application of design guidelines ==
=== Prevention of nucleate boiling ===
In designing a film plate evaporator, the use of superheated liquid needs to be controlled in order to prevent nucleate boiling. Nucleate boiling will cause product deterioration resulting from increases in chemical reaction rates that come from the raise in temperature. Nucleate boiling will cause fouling to occur, thus affecting the rate of heat transfer of the process. In order to avoid nucleate boiling, the liquid superheat should be in the range of 3 to 40 K depending on the liquid used.

=== Short residence time ===
Minimizing residence time is important in order to minimize the occurrence of chemical reactions between the feed and the evaporator materials, thus reducing fouling within the evaporator. This guideline is especially important in the food processing industry, where purity of output product is paramount. In this application, residence time bears directly on product quality, thus it is important for the climbing and falling film plate evaporator to have low residence time.

=== Waste stream production ===
Condensate is the waste that had been discharged through waste stream in climbing and falling-film evaporator. This evaporator will discharge vapor as the condensate as vapor pass through more rapidly than the liquid flows in the tube.

In each evaporation unit, the feed enter from the bottom of tubesheet of pass through the climbing and falling film segment. When the liquid rises throughout the tube, boiling and vaporization process occurred as it is contact with the steam heated plates. Then the mixture that contains liquid and vapour are discharged and it is reallocated at the top of falling film pass tubes. The vapour that produced by climbing film is used to increase the velocity of liquid in the distribution liquid tubes in order to rise up the heat transfer. External separator is used to separate the mixture of both liquid and water that produced at the down-flow.

=== Post-treatment ===
In a multi-effect evaporator, the vapor output of one phase of the evaporator is recycled as the heating medium for the next phase, reducing the overall consumption of steam for the evaporator.

A surface condenser is used to condense the vapor that produced in the second effect process. In order to recover the heat that had been used in this evaporator, both of the vapor condensate is pumped to the pre-heater feed so that it can produce heat to this process.

== Range of applications ==
Climbing/falling film plate evaporators are used in a range of applications:

=== Fruit juice concentration ===
Fruit juices are condensed by evaporation for storage, transport and commercial use. If fruit juices are exposed to heat, the nutrient content such as vitamin C may be affected. Furthermore, these nutrients are easily oxidized at high temperature. The evaporator can overcome this constraint as it operates at high feed flow rate and small temperature difference. In addition, the change in color and texture of the juices can be prevented via the operation of this evaporator type.

=== Dairy industry ===
Other protein-rich products such as whey powder in dietary supplement and milk (including both skim and whole milk) are concentrated to remove most liquid components for further processes. Protein is easily denatured at high temperature because its tertiary structure is degraded upon exposure to heat. Evaporation via climbing and falling film plate design can minimize the effect of protein denaturation and thus, optimizing the product quality.

=== Other food industry applications ===
Instant and concentrated cooking ingredients such as pasta sauce, chicken broth, vegetable purees etc. undergo evaporation through the same evaporating equipment. Although they are relatively less sensitive to heat, evaporating them at low temperature and short residence time is crucial to maintain the quality taste, texture appearance and nutritional value.

=== Pharmaceuticals ===
Antibiotics, supplementary pills and drugs containing organic and inorganic compounds are evaporated to remove as much moisture as possible for crystallization. This is because in crystallized form, antibiotics and enzyme compounds will be well preserved and improved in stability. Moreover, exposure to high temperature will lead to decomposition of inorganic compounds. Although most pharmaceutical products are extremely sensitive in temperature, this type of evaporator is still practical to be used since several design of this evaporators are able to operate at low pressure since the boiling point of water is low as pressure decreases.

== Limitations ==
There are few limitations of this evaporator that makes it not applicable for all range of industrial processes. The evaporator needs to be operated within the range of 26–100 °C and is able to remove water in a range of 450–16,000 kg/h. In order to provide the proper rising/falling characteristics, most evaporators are quite tall and can only be installed in a space that is 4 metres (13 ft) high. The suspended solid in the liquid feed need to be low and can pass through 50 mesh screen.

== Development ==
There are several problems related to climbing and falling film plate evaporators. One of them is the energy intensive system. In order to improve the productivity of the plant, the energy consumption needs to be reduced with the intention of reducing the use of steam. New strategies had been proposed by investigator to reduce the utilization of steam to improve the system of economic steam. The examples of operating strategies are flashing of feed, product and condensate, splitting of feed and steam and use of optimum feed flow series.

Several techniques have been suggested to minimize energy consumption:

- Installation of a large number of steam effects to an evaporator.
- Recycling the steam via thermocompression or mechanical compression when possible.
- Assuring that the feed to an evaporator is preheated to the boiling point.
- Minimizing the heat gradient in the evaporator.
- Insulating the equipment to minimize the losses of the heat.
