= Evaporator =

Machine transforming a liquid into a gas

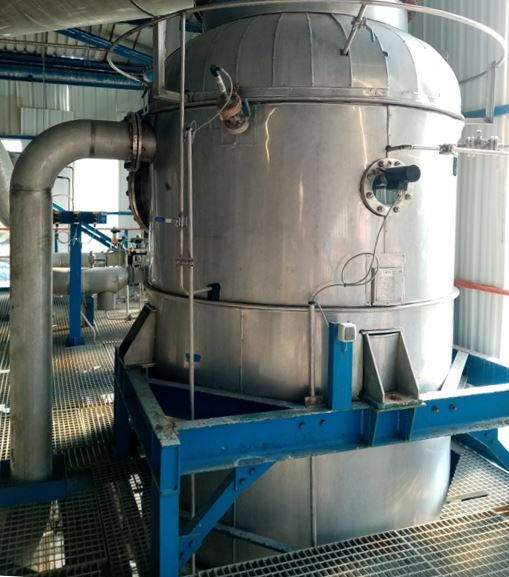
An industrial evaporator used in a chemical plant in Turkey.

An evaporator is a type of heat exchanger device that facilitates evaporation by utilizing conductive and convective heat transfer, which provides the necessary thermal energy for phase transition from liquid to vapour. Within evaporators, a circulating liquid is exposed to an atmospheric or reduced pressure environment causing it to boil at a lower temperature compared to normal atmospheric boiling.

The four main components of an evaporator assembly are:

1. Tubes or channels where the refrigerant liquid is circulated
2. Fins or other enhanced surfaces to increase heat transfer area
3. A source of heat such as steam or combustion gases directed over the tubes
4. Distillation of vapor into an outlet piping system

Heat is transferred to the liquid inside the tube walls via conduction providing the thermal energy needed for evaporation. Convective currents inside it also contribute to heat transfer efficiency.

There are various evaporator designs suitable for different applications including shell and tube, plate, and flooded evaporators, commonly used in industrial processes such as desalination, power generation and air conditioning. Plate-type evaporators offer compactness while multi-stage designs enable enhanced evaporation rates at lower heat duties. The overall performance of evaporators depends on factors such as the heat transfer coefficient, tube/plate material properties, flow regime, and achieved vapor quality.

Advanced control techniques, such as online fouling detection, help maintain evaporator thermal performance over time. Additionally, computational fluid dynamics (CFD) modeling and advancements in surface coating technologies continue to enhance heat and mass transfer capabilities, leading to more energy-efficient vapor generation. Evaporators are essential to many industries because of their ability to separate phases through a controlled phase change process.

== Uses ==
=== Air conditioning and refrigeration ===
Some air conditioners and refrigerators use compressed liquids with a low boiling point that vaporizes within the system to cool it, whilst emitting the thermal energy into its surroundings.

=== Food industry and synthetic chemistry ===
Evaporators are often used to concentrate a solution. An example is the climbing/falling film plate evaporator, which is used to make condensed milk.

Similarly, reduction (cooking) is a process of evaporating liquids from a solution to produce a "reduced" food product, such as wine reduction.

Evaporation is the main process behind distillation, which is used to concentrate alcohol, isolate liquid chemical products, or recover solvents in chemical reactions. The fragrance and essential oil industry uses distillation to purify compounds. Each application uses specialized devices.

=== Chemical engineering ===
In the case of desalination of seawater or in Zero Liquid Discharge plants, the reverse purpose applies; evaporation removes the desirable drinking water from the undesired solute/product, salt.

Chemical engineering uses evaporation in many processes. For example, the multiple-effect evaporator is used in Kraft pulping, the process of producing wood pulp from wood.

=== Marine ===
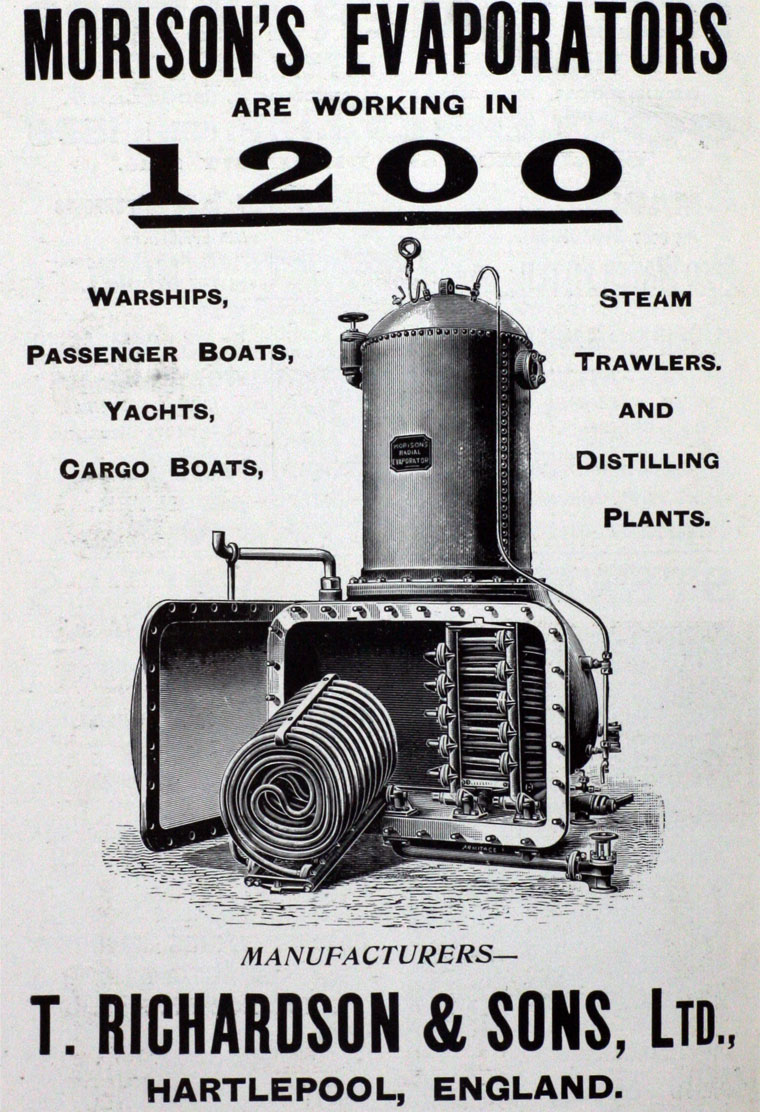

Large ships usually carry evaporating plants to produce fresh water, reducing their reliance on shore-based supplies. Steamships must produce high-quality distillate to maintain boiler-water levels. Diesel engine ships often utilize waste heat as an energy source for producing fresh water. In this system, the engine-cooling water is passed through a heat exchange, where it is cooled by concentrated seawater. Because the cooling water, which is chemically treated fresh water, is at a temperature of 70–80 °C (158–176 °F), it would not be possible to flash off any water vapor unless the pressure in the heat exchanger vessel is dropped.

A brine-air ejector venturi pump is then used to create a vacuum inside the vessel, achieving partial evaporation. The vapor then passes through a demister before reaching the condenser section. Seawater is pumped through the condenser section to cool the vapor sufficiently for condensation. The distillate gathers in a tray, from where it is pumped to the storage tanks. A salinometer monitors salt content and diverts the flow of distillate from the storage tanks if the salt content exceeds the alarm limit. Sterilization is carried out after the evaporator.

Evaporators are usually of the shell-and-tube type (known as an Atlas Plant) or of the plate type (such as the type designed by Alfa Laval). Temperature, production and vacuum are controlled by regulating the system valves. Seawater temperature can interfere with production, as can fluctuations in engine load. For this reason, the evaporator is adjusted as seawater temperature changes and shuts down altogether when the ship is maneuvering. An alternative in some vessels, such as naval ships and passenger ships, is the use of the reverse osmosis principle for fresh-water production instead of using evaporators.

== Energetic ==
Evaporation, or vaporization, is an endothermic phase transition process that is thoroughly understood in the field of thermodynamics. It is intimately related to the vapor pressure of the liquid and surrounding pressure, in addition to the enthalpy of vaporization.

== Types of evaporators ==
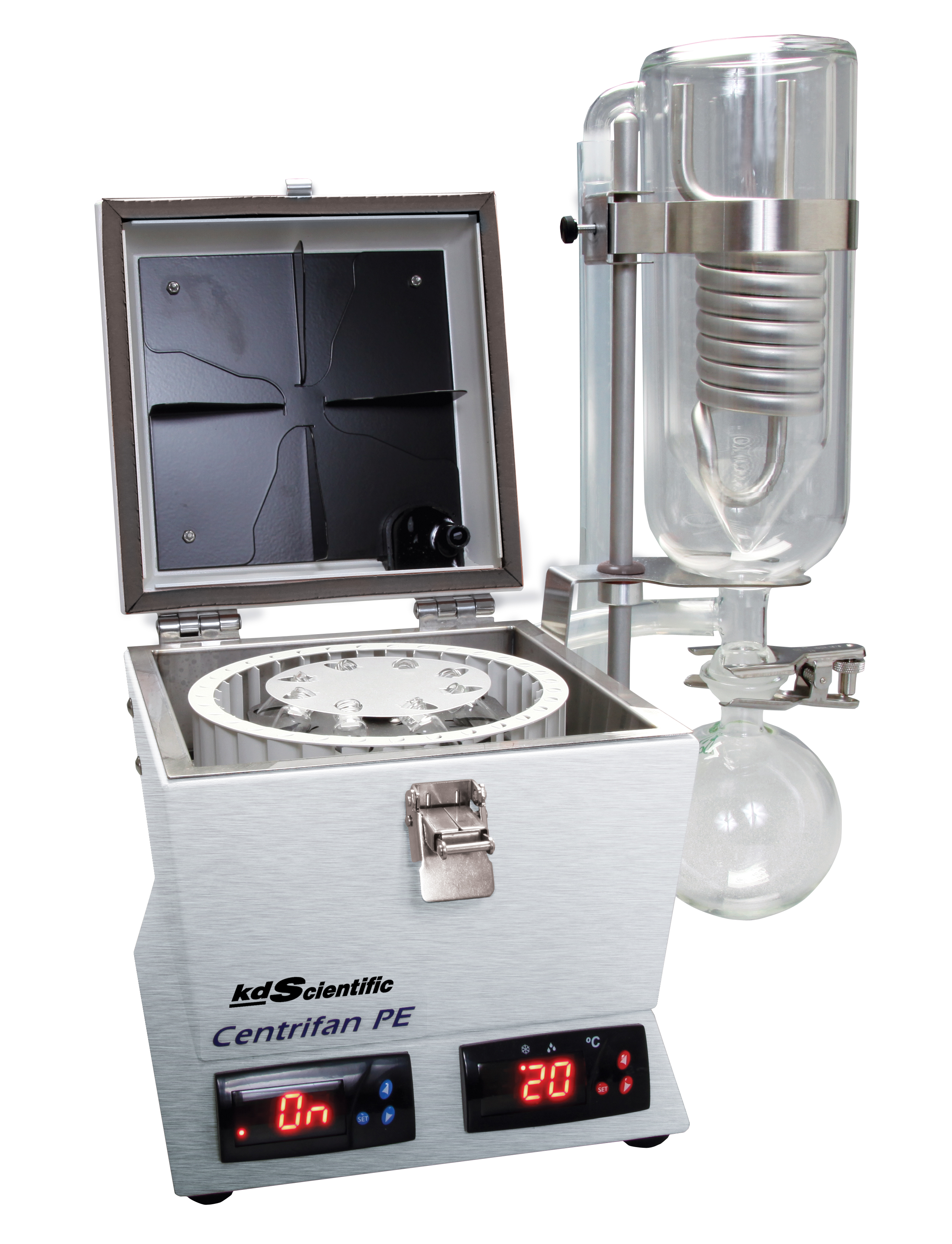
Evaporator with SBT to eliminate bumping.

Evaporators work using the same principle design. A heat source is in contact with the liquid causing it to evaporate. The vapor is removed entirely (like in cooking), or it is stored for reuse (like in a refrigerator) or a product for isolation (essential oil).

=== Rotary evaporator ===
Rotary evaporators use a vacuum pump to create a low pressure over a solvent while simultaneously rotating the liquid flask to increase surface area and decrease bubble size. Typically, the vapor is passed over a cold finger or coil so that the vaporized material does not damage the pump. The rotary evaporator is best used for removing solvent from solutions containing the desired product that will not vaporize at the operating pressure to separate the volatile components of a mixture from non-volatile materials.

=== Natural/forced circulation evaporator ===
Natural circulation evaporators are based on the natural circulation of the product caused by the density differences that arise from heating (convection). A chamber containing a solution is heated, and the vaporized liquid is collected in a receiving flask.

=== Falling film evaporator ===
This type of evaporator is generally made of 4–8 m (13–26 ft) tubes enclosed by steam jackets. The uniform distribution of the solution is important when using this type of evaporator. The solution enters the evaporator and gains velocity as it flows downward. This gain in velocity is attributed to the vapor being evolved against the heating medium, which also flows downward. This evaporator is usually applied to highly viscous solutions, so it is frequently used in the chemical, sugar, food, and fermentation industries.

=== Rising film (long tube vertical) evaporator ===
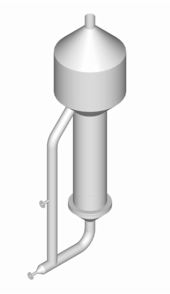
A rising film evaporator.

This type of evaporator is useful in concentrating solutions. The operation is very similar to that of a calandria where the liquid is boiled inside vertical tubes by applying heat to the outside of the tubes. The produced solvent vapor presses the liquid against the walls of the tubes forming a thin film that moves upwards with the vapor. The vapor may be released from the system while the liquid may be recirculated through the evaporator to further concentrate the solute. In many cases, the tubes of a rising film evaporator are usually between 3–10 metres (9.8–32.8 ft) in height with a diameter of between 25–50 millimetres (0.98–1.97 in). Sizing this type of evaporator requires a precise evaluation of the actual level of the liquid inside the tubes and the flow rates of the vapor and film.

=== Climbing and falling-film plate evaporator ===
Climbing and falling-film plate evaporators have a relatively large surface area. The plates are usually corrugated and are supported by the frame. During evaporation, steam flows through the channels formed by the free spaces between the plates. The steam alternately climbs and falls parallel to the concentrated liquid. The steam follows a co-current, counter-current path with the liquid. The concentrate and the vapor are fed into the separation stage, where the vapor is sent to a condenser. This type of plate evaporator is frequently applied in the dairy and fermentation industries since they have spatial flexibility. A negative point of this type of evaporator is its limited ability to treat viscous or solid-containing products. There are other types of plate evaporators that work with only climbing film.

=== Multiple-effect evaporators ===
Unlike single-stage evaporators, these evaporators can be composed of up to seven evaporator stages (effects). The energy consumption for single-effect evaporators is very high and is most of the cost for an evaporation system. Putting together evaporators saves heat and thus requires less energy. Adding one evaporator to the original decreases energy consumption by 50%. Adding another effect reduces it to 33% and so on. A heat-saving-percent equation can estimate how much one will save by adding a certain number of effects.

The number of effects in a multiple-effect evaporator is usually restricted to seven because, after that, the equipment cost approaches the cost savings of the energy-requirement drop.

Two types of feeding can be used when dealing with multiple-effect evaporators:

- Forward feeding: This occurs when the product enters the system through the first effect at the highest temperature. The product is then partially concentrated as some water is transformed into vapor and carried away. It is then fed into the second effect, which is slightly lower in temperature. The second effect uses the heated vapor created in the first stage as its heat source (hence the saving in energy expenditure). The combination of lower temperatures and higher viscosity in subsequent effects provides good conditions for treating heat-sensitive products, such as enzymes and proteins. In this system, an increase in the heating surface area of subsequent effects is required.
- Backwards feeding: In this process, the dilute products are fed into the last effect with the lowest temperature and transferred from effect to effect, with the temperature increasing. The final concentrate is collected in the hottest effect, which provides an advantage in that the product is highly viscous in the last stages, so the heat transfer is better.

In recent years, multiple-effect vacuum evaporator (with heat pump) systems have come into use. These are well known to be energetically and technically more effective than systems with mechanical vapor recompression (MVR). Due to the lower boiling temperature, they can handle highly corrosive liquids or liquids which are prone to forming incrustations.

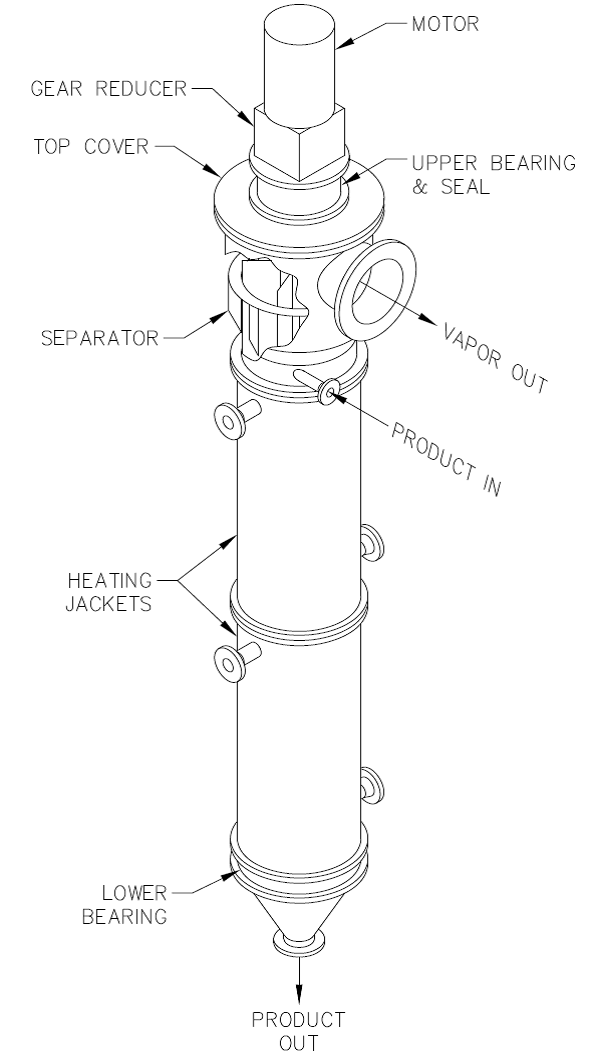
Agitated Thin / Wiped Film Evaporator Diagram.

=== Agitated thin film evaporators ===
Agitated thin-film evaporation has been very successful with difficult-to-handle products. Simply stated, the method quickly separates the volatile from the less volatile components using indirect heat transfer and mechanical agitation of the flowing product film under controlled conditions. The separation is normally made under vacuum conditions to maximize ∆T while maintaining the most favorable product temperature so that the product only sees equilibrium conditions inside the evaporator and can maximize volatile stripping and recovery.

=== Problems ===
Technical problems can arise during evaporation, especially when the process is used in the food industry. Some evaporators are sensitive to differences in viscosity and consistency of the dilute solution. These evaporators could work inefficiently because of a loss of circulation. The pump of an evaporator may need to be changed if the evaporator needs to be used to concentrate a highly viscous solution.

Fouling also occurs when hard deposits form on the surfaces of the heating mediums in the evaporators. In foods, proteins and polysaccharides can create such deposits that reduce the efficiency of heat transfer. Foaming can also create a problem since dealing with excess foam can be costly in time and efficiency. Antifoam agents are used, but only a few can be used when food is being processed.

Corrosion can also occur when acidic solutions such as citrus juices are concentrated. The surface damage caused can shorten the long life of evaporators. The quality and flavor of food can also suffer during evaporation. Overall, when choosing an evaporator, the qualities of the product solution must be taken into careful consideration.

== See also ==
- Flash evaporation
- Vacuum evaporation
- Centrifugal evaporator
- Rotary evaporator
- Vapor-compression evaporator
- Evaporative cooler
- Pumpable ice technology
- Circulation evaporator
