= Α-L-Rhamnosidase =

Class of enzymes

α-L-Rhamnosidase

Identifiers
- EC no.: 3.2.1.40
- CAS no.: 37288-35-0

Databases
- IntEnz: IntEnz view
- BRENDA: BRENDA entry
- ExPASy: NiceZyme view
- KEGG: KEGG entry
- MetaCyc: metabolic pathway
- PRIAM: profile
- PDB structures: RCSB PDB PDBe PDBsum
Search
- PMC: articles
- PubMed: articles
- NCBI: proteins

α-L-Rhamnosidase (EC 3.2.1.40, α-L-rhamnosidase T, α-L-rhamnosidase N) is an enzyme with systematic name α-L-rhamnoside rhamnohydrolase. This enzyme catalyses the following chemical reaction

Hydrolysis of terminal non-reducing α-L-rhamnose residues in α-L-rhamnosides
